= Pine Hills, California =

Pine Hills
- census-designated place
- Location in Humboldt County and the state of California
- Coordinates: 40°43′59″N 124°09′08″W
- Country: United States
- State: California
- County: Humboldt

Area
  - Total: 10.158 sq mi (26.308 km^{2})
  - Land: 10.116 sq mi (26.201 km^{2})
  - Water: 0.041 sq mi (0.107 km^{2}) 0.41%
- Elevation: 420 ft (128 m)

Population (2020)
  - Total: 3,186
  - Density: 314.9/sq mi (121.6/km^{2})
- Time zone: UTC-8 (Pacific (PST))
  - Summer (DST): UTC-7 (PDT)
- ZIP code: 95503
- Area code: 707
- FIPS code: 06-57204
- GNIS feature ID: 1867051

Pine Hills is a census-designated place (CDP) in Humboldt County, California, United States, adjacent to Eureka. The population was 3,186 at the 2020 census, up from 3,131 at the 2010 census. Pine Hills includes areas like Ridgewood and areas as far south as the small neighborhood of Elk River. An area near this artificial census construct is called Pine Hill by Local government agencies and officials. Pine Hill is a much smaller area than "Pine Hills" and as defined by local agencies is actually within an adjacent CDP named Bayview.

== Geography ==
Pine Hills is located at 40°43′59″N 124°09′08″W.

According to the United States Census Bureau, the CDP has a total area of 10.2 square miles (26 km^{2}), over 99% land.

== Demographics ==
Historical population
Census	Pop.	Note	%±
1980	2,686		—
1990	2,947		9.7%
2000	3,108		5.5%
2010	3,131		0.7%
2020	3,186		1.8%
U.S. Decennial Census; 1860–1870 1880-1890; 1900 1910 1920; 1930 1940 1950; 1960 1970 1980; 1990 2000 2010; 2020

Pine Hills was part of the Bayview-Pine Hills unincorporated community in the 1970 U.S. census (pop. 2,340); and then was listed independently as a census designated place in the 1980 U.S. census.

=== Racial and ethnic composition ===
Pine Hills CDP, California – Racial and ethnic composition Note: the US Census treats Hispanic/Latino as an ethnic category. This table excludes Latinos from the racial categories and assigns them to a separate category. Hispanics/Latinos may be of any race.
Race / Ethnicity (NH = Non-Hispanic)	Pop 2000	Pop 2010	Pop 2020	% 2000	% 2010	% 2020
White alone (NH)	2,715	2,562	2,359	87.36%	81.83%	74.04%
Black or African American alone (NH)	16	21	19	0.51%	0.67%	0.60%
Native American or Alaska Native alone (NH)	71	68	75	2.28%	2.17%	2.35%
Asian alone (NH)	46	113	126	1.48%	3.61%	3.95%
Native Hawaiian or Pacific Islander alone (NH)	9	4	3	0.29%	0.13%	0.09%
Other race alone (NH)	0	8	18	0.00%	0.26%	0.56%
Mixed race or Multiracial (NH)	108	135	246	3.47%	4.31%	7.72%
Hispanic or Latino (any race)	143	220	340	4.60%	7.03%	10.67%
Total	3,108	3,131	3,186	100.00%	100.00%	100.00%

=== 2020 census ===
As of the 2020 census, Pine Hills had a population of 3,186. The population density was 314.9 inhabitants per square mile (121.6/km^{2}). 70.4% of residents lived in urban areas, while 29.6% lived in rural areas.

The census reported that 99.5% of the population lived in households, 0.3% lived in non-institutionalized group quarters, and 0.3% were institutionalized. There were 1,270 households, out of which 27.9% included children under the age of 18, 48.0% were married-couple households, 9.5% were cohabiting couple households, 25.3% had a female householder with no spouse or partner present, and 17.2% had a male householder with no spouse or partner present. 23.2% of households were one person, and 12.7% were one person aged 65 or older. The average household size was 2.5. There were 848 families (66.8% of all households).

The age distribution was 20.0% under the age of 18, 7.0% aged 18 to 24, 25.4% aged 25 to 44, 23.3% aged 45 to 64, and 24.3% who were 65 years of age or older. The median age was 42.7 years. For every 100 females, there were 98.3 males, and for every 100 females age 18 and over there were 97.7 males age 18 and over.

There were 1,349 housing units at an average density of 133.4 units per square mile (51.5 units/km^{2}), of which 1,270 (94.1%) were occupied. Of the occupied units, 73.3% were owner-occupied and 26.7% were occupied by renters. 5.9% of housing units were vacant. The homeowner vacancy rate was 0.5% and the rental vacancy rate was 3.6%.

=== Income and poverty ===
In 2023, the US Census Bureau estimated that the median household income was $83,791, and the per capita income was $43,619. About 13.3% of families and 22.2% of the population were below the poverty line.

=== 2010 census ===
The 2010 United States census reported that Pine Hills had a population of 3,131. The population density was 308.2 inhabitants per square mile (119.0/km^{2}). The racial makeup of Pine Hills was 2,648 (84.6%) White, 22 (0.7%) African American, 86 (2.7%) Native American, 116 (3.7%) Asian, 4 (0.1%) Pacific Islander, 72 (2.3%) from other races, and 183 (5.8%) from two or more races. Hispanic or Latino of any race were 220 persons (7.0%).

The Census reported that 3,112 people (99.4% of the population) lived in households, 19 (0.6%) lived in non-institutionalized group quarters, and 0 (0%) were institutionalized.

There were 1,261 households, out of which 357 (28.3%) had children under the age of 18 living in them, 706 (56.0%) were opposite-sex married couples living together, 91 (7.2%) had a female householder with no husband present, 68 (5.4%) had a male householder with no wife present. There were 93 (7.4%) unmarried opposite-sex partnerships, and 11 (0.9%) same-sex married couples or partnerships. 282 households (22.4%) were made up of individuals, and 115 (9.1%) had someone living alone who was 65 years of age or older. The average household size was 2.47. There were 865 families (68.6% of all households); the average family size was 2.89.

The population was spread out, with 645 people (20.6%) under the age of 18, 239 people (7.6%) aged 18 to 24, 662 people (21.1%) aged 25 to 44, 1,051 people (33.6%) aged 45 to 64, and 534 people (17.1%) who were 65 years of age or older. The median age was 45.6 years. For every 100 females, there were 99.9 males. For every 100 females age 18 and over, there were 100.0 males.

There were 1,327 housing units at an average density of 130.6 per square mile (50.4/km^{2}), of which 1,261 were occupied, of which 932 (73.9%) were owner-occupied, and 329 (26.1%) were occupied by renters. The homeowner vacancy rate was 1.2%; the rental vacancy rate was 3.8%. 2,308 people (73.7% of the population) lived in owner-occupied housing units and 804 people (25.7%) lived in rental housing units.

== Politics ==
In the state legislature, Pine Hills is in the 2nd senatorial district, represented by Democrat Mike McGuire, and the 2nd Assembly district, represented by Democrat Chris Rogers.

Federally, Pine Hills is in California's 2nd congressional district, represented by Democrat Jared Huffman.
