= Fruitland, California =

Unincorporated community in California, United States

Fruitland
- Unincorporated community
- Location in California Fruitland (the United States)
- Coordinates: 40°17′45″N 123°49′31″W
- Country: United States
- State: California
- County: Humboldt
- Elevation: 1,004 ft (306 m)

Fruitland (formerly Elk Prairie) is an unincorporated community in Humboldt County, California, United States. It is located 6 miles (10 kilometers) east-southeast of Weott, at an elevation of 1,004 feet (306 m).

A post office operated at Fruitland from 1890 to 1934. The first settlers of Fruitland were a colony of immigrants from the Netherlands who planted orchards sponsored by David Page Cutten, the namesake of Cutten, approximately 37 mi (60 km) northwest of Fruitland. The isolation of this colony in a time when there was little adequate long-distance transportation ultimately led to the dissolution of the colony's fruit market.
