= Humboldt County, California =

County in California, United States

Coordinates: 40.8°N 123.8°W

Humboldt County
- County
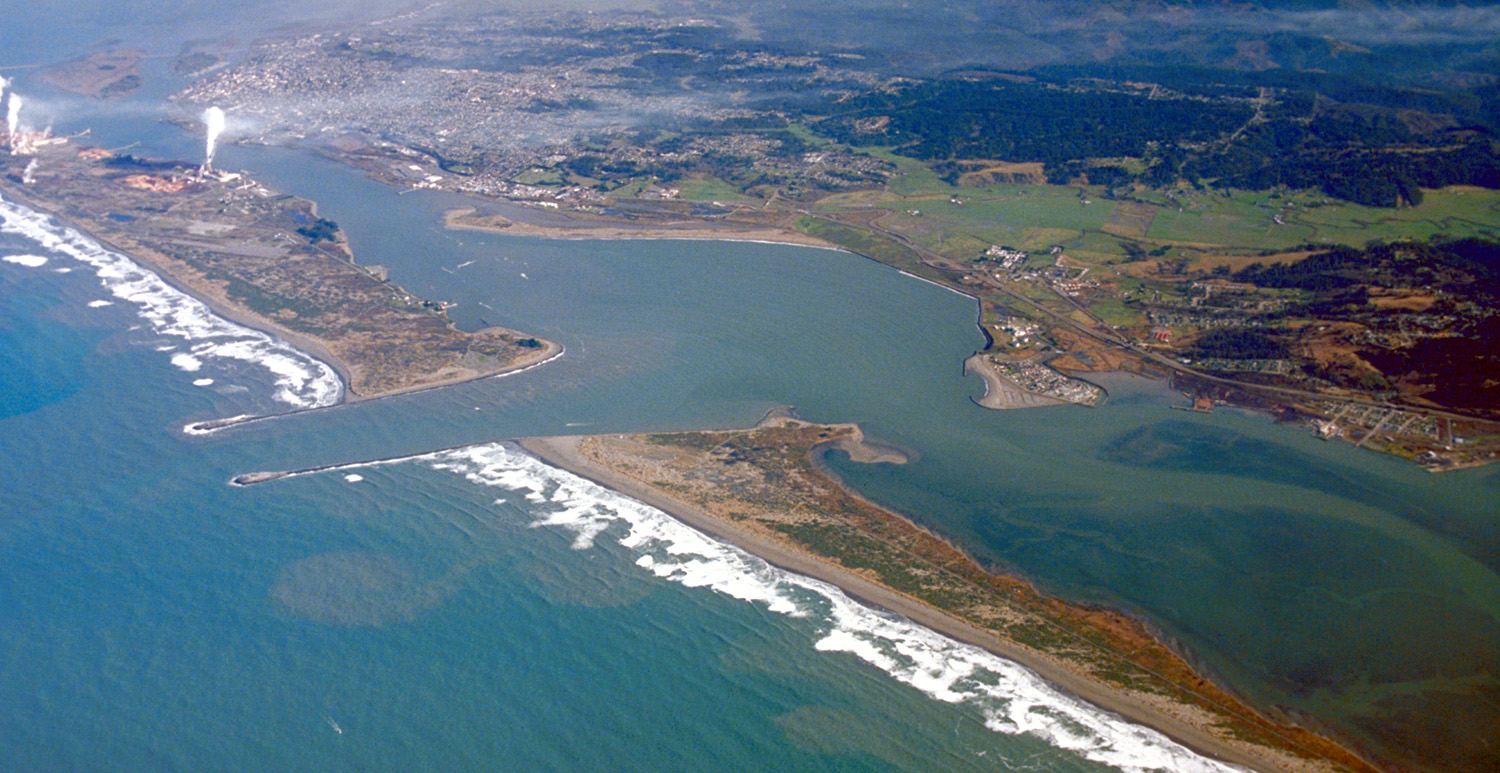
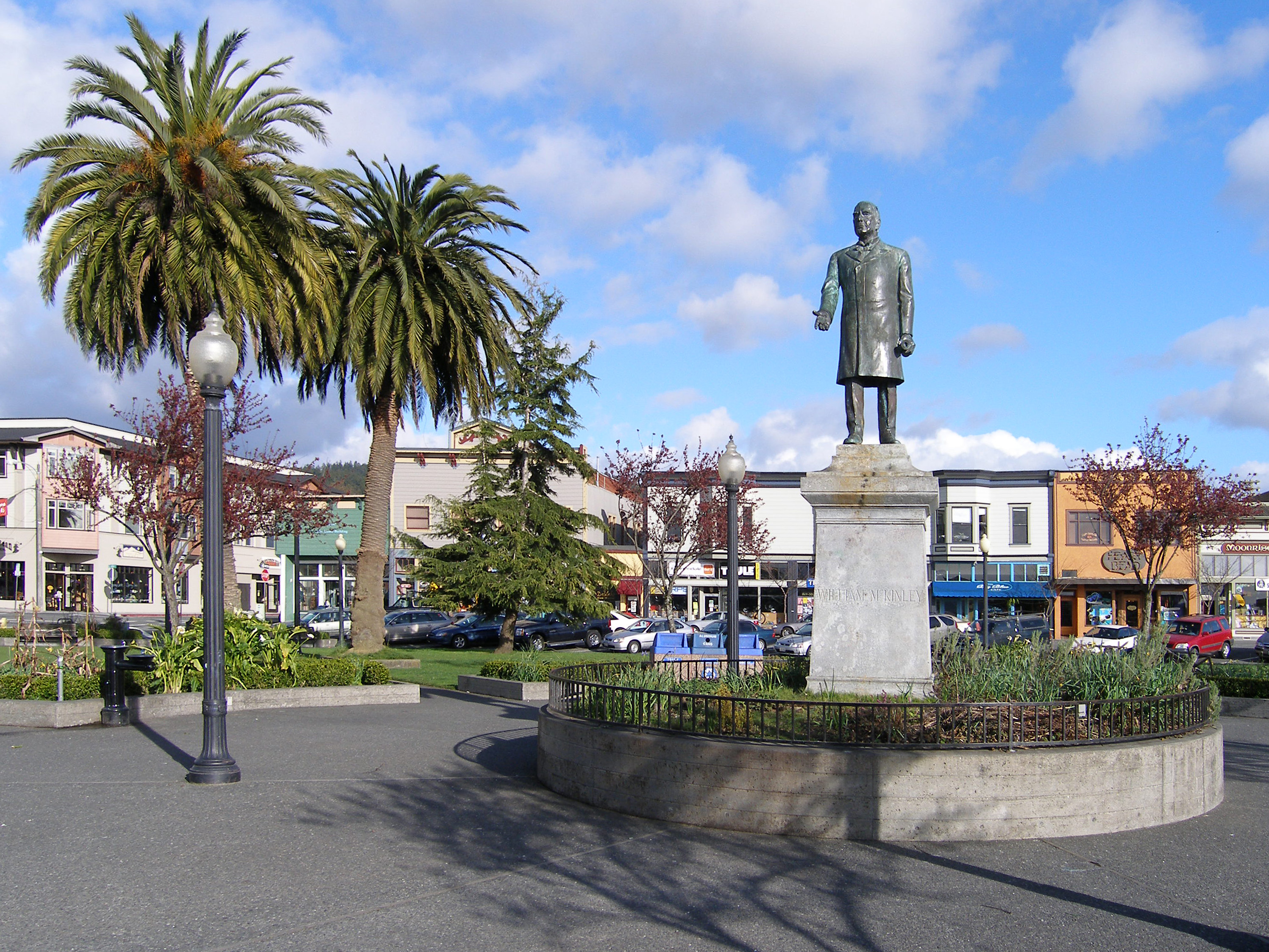
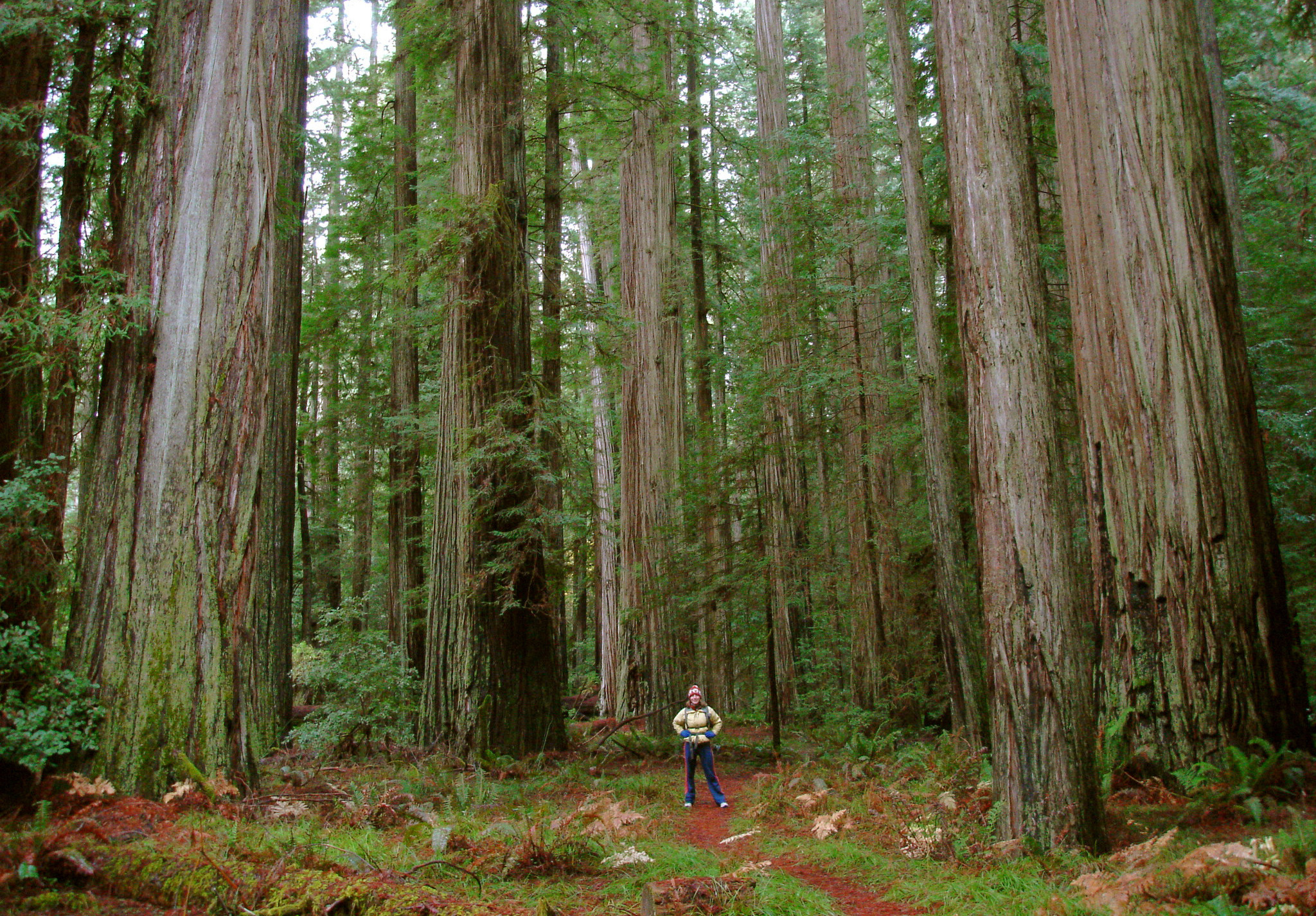
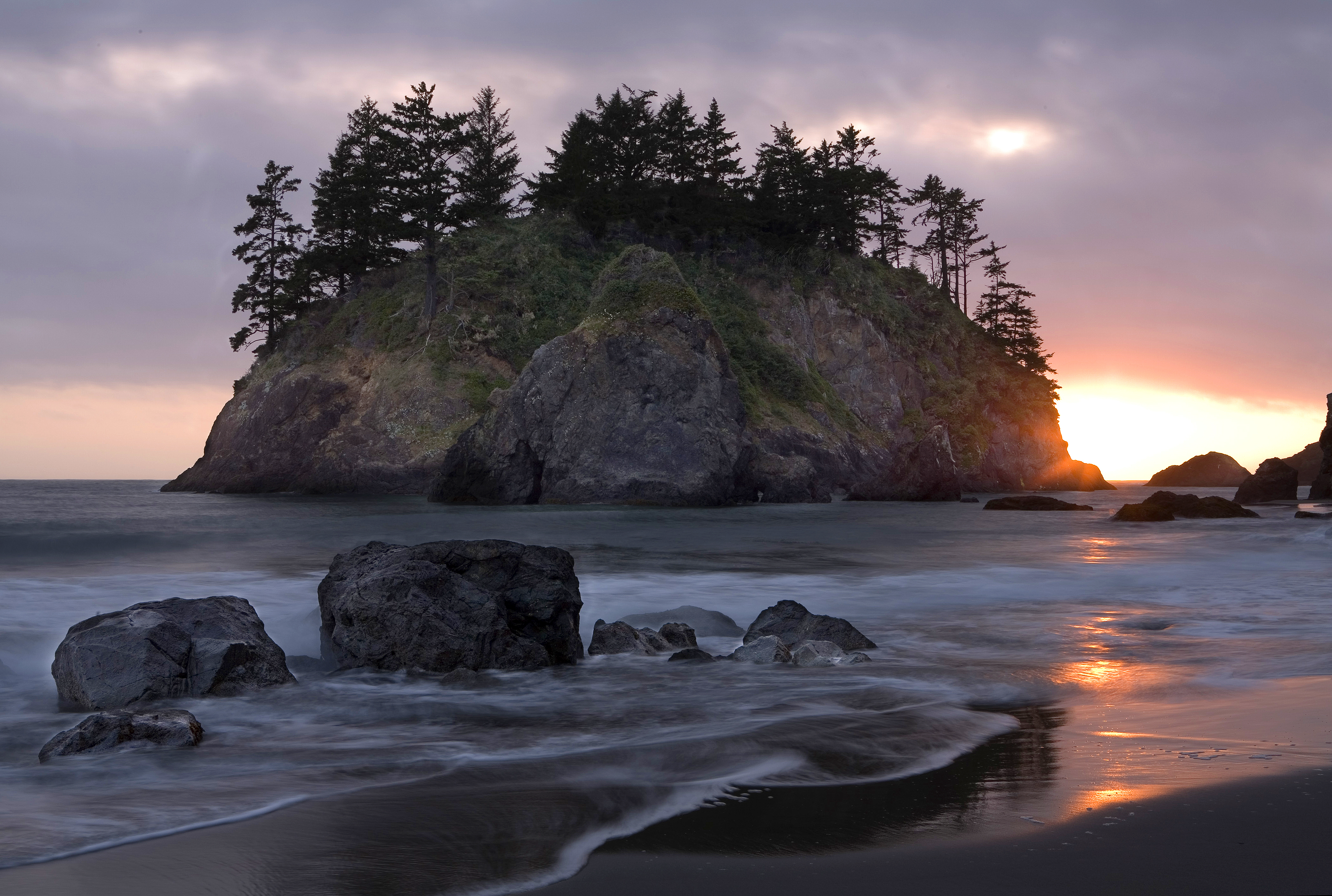
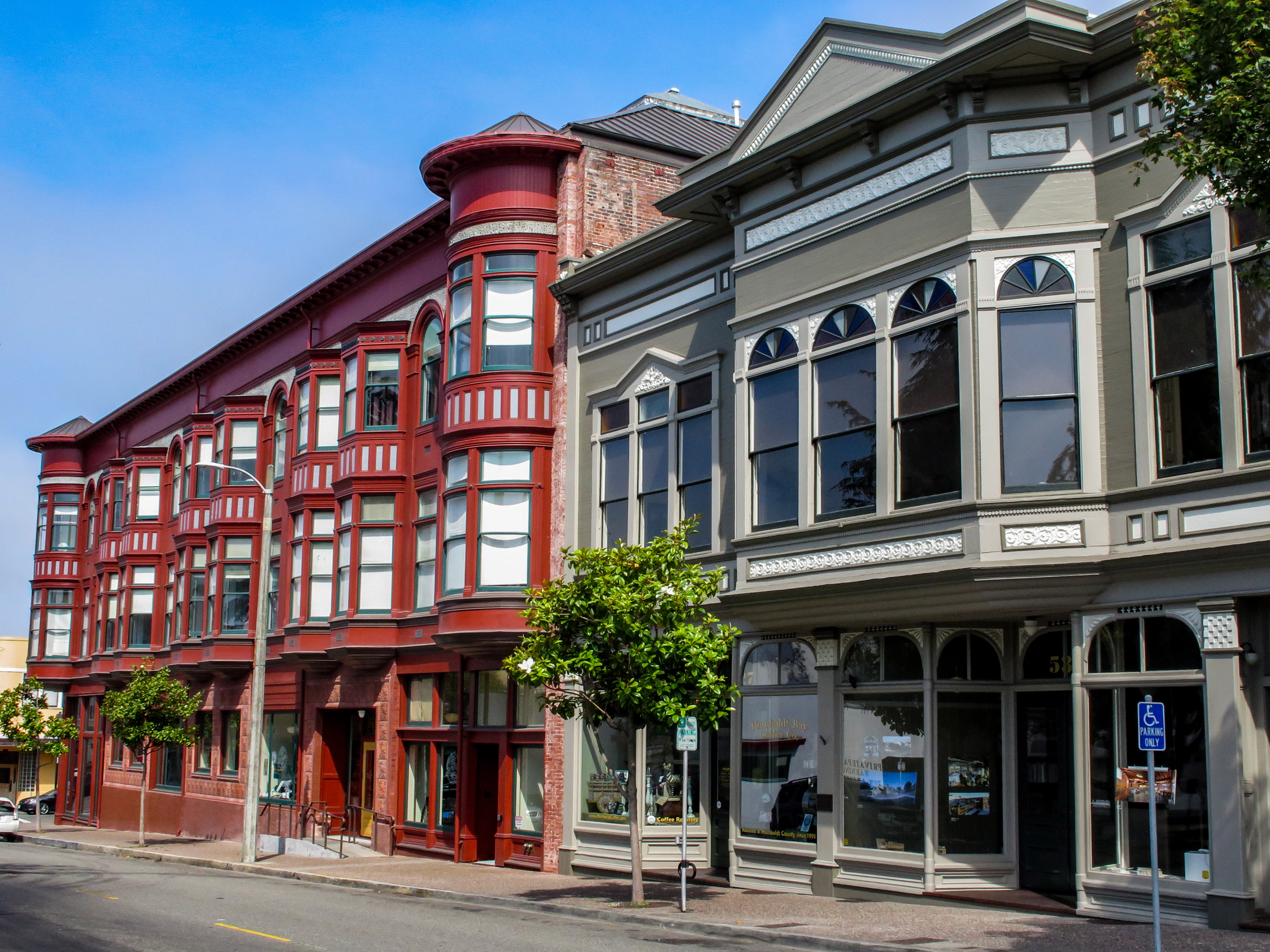
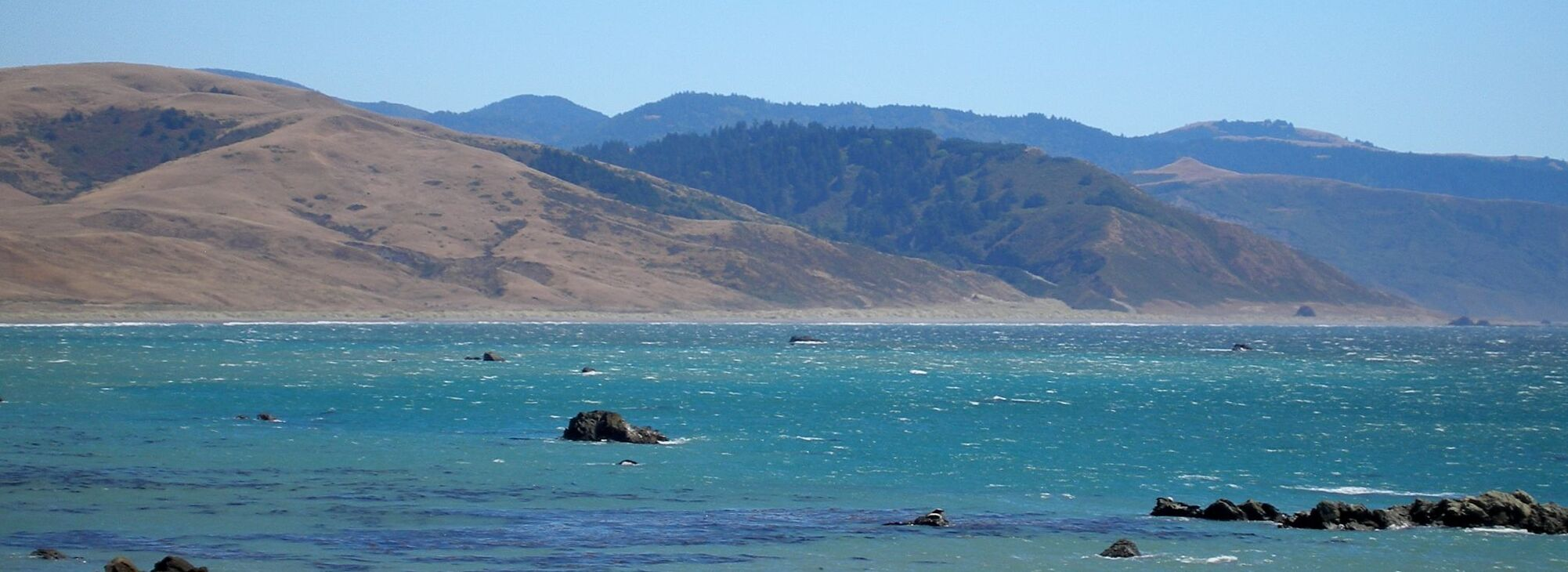
- Humboldt Bay Arcata Humboldt Redwoods Trinidad Head Eureka Cape Mendocino

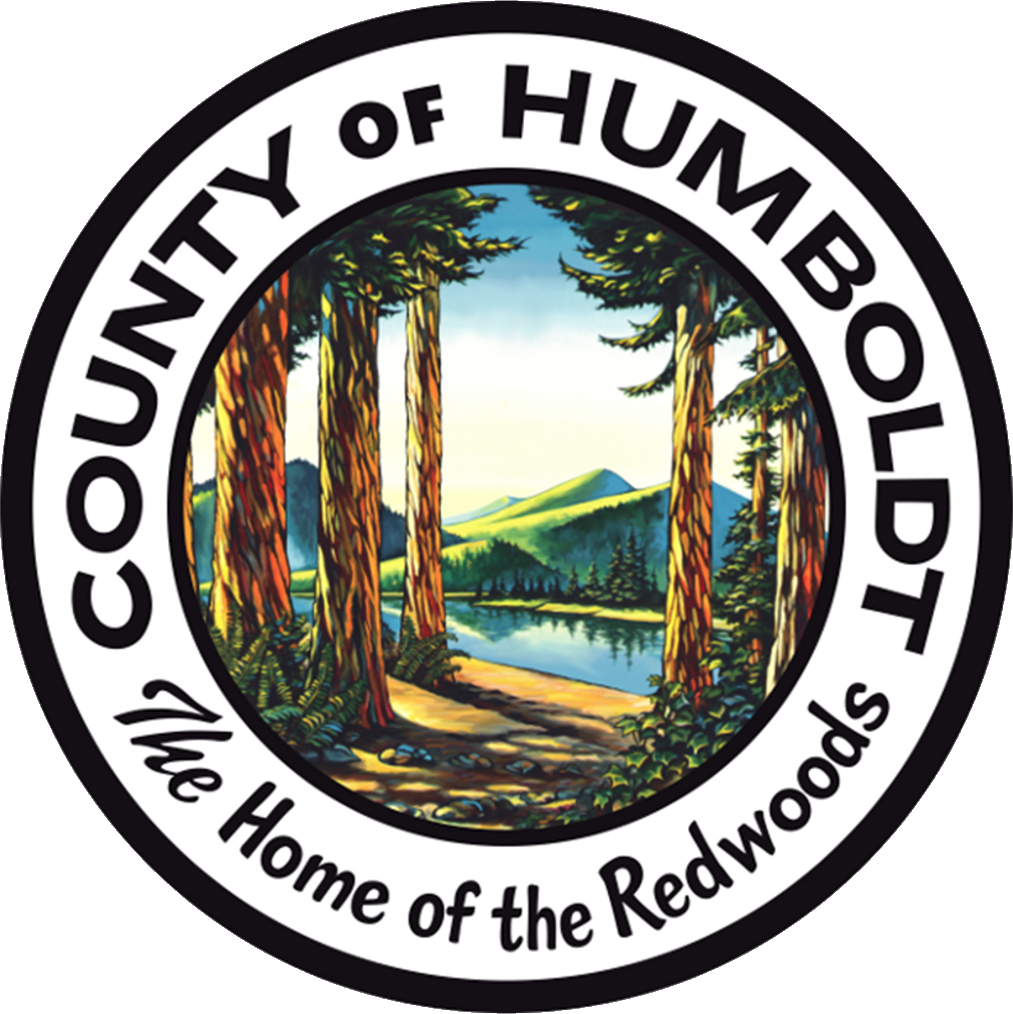
- Seal
- Motto: "The Home of the Redwoods"
- Interactive map of Humboldt County
- Location in the state of California
- Country: United States
- State: California
- Region: North Coast
- Incorporated: May 12, 1853
- Named for: Humboldt Bay, which was named after Alexander von Humboldt
- County seat: Eureka
- Largest city: Eureka

Government
  - Type: Council–CAO
  - Chair: Mike Wilson
  - Vice Chair: Natalie Arroyo
  - Board of Supervisors: Supervisors: Rex Bohn; Michelle Bushnell; Mike Wilson; Natalie Arroyo; Steve Madrone
  - County Administrative Officer: Elishia Hayes

Area
  - Total: 4,052 sq mi (10,490 km^{2})
  - Land: 3,568 sq mi (9,240 km^{2})
  - Water: 484 sq mi (1,250 km^{2})
- Highest elevation: 6,956 ft (2,120 m)

Population (2020)
  - Total: 136,463
  - Estimate (2025): 131,647 ▼
  - Density: 38.25/sq mi (14.77/km^{2})

GDP
  - Total: $6.843 billion (2022)
- Time zone: UTC−8 (Pacific Time Zone)
  - Summer (DST): UTC−7 (Pacific Daylight Time)
- Area codes: 707, 530
- Congressional district: 2nd
- Website: humboldtgov.org

Humboldt County (/ˈhʌmboʊlt/) is the westernmost county in the U.S. state of California. As of the 2020 census, the population was 136,463. Humboldt County comprises the Eureka–Arcata–Fortuna, California, Micropolitan Statistical Area. The county seat is Eureka.

It is located on the far North Coast of California, about 270 miles (435 km) north of San Francisco. It has among the most diverse climates of United States counties, with very mild coastal summers and hot interior days. Similar to the greater region, summers are extremely dry and winters bring substantial rainfall.

Its primary population centers—Eureka, site of College of the Redwoods' main campus, and the smaller town of Arcata, site of California State Polytechnic University, Humboldt—are both adjacent to northern Humboldt Bay, California's second largest natural bay. Area cities and towns are known for hundreds of ornate examples of Victorian architecture.

Humboldt County is a rugged, densely forested, mostly rural region situated within the California Coast and Klamath mountain ranges. It features about 110 miles (177 km) of coastline along the Pacific Ocean, more than any other county in the state. With nearly 1,500,000 acres (6,100 km^{2}) of combined public and private forest in production, Humboldt County alone produces twenty percent of the total volume and thirty percent of the total value of all forest products produced in California. The county contains over forty percent of all remaining old growth Coast Redwood forests, the vast majority of which are protected or strictly conserved within dozens of national, state, and local forests and parks, totaling approximately 680,000 acres (1,060 sq mi; 280,000 ha).

== History ==
The original inhabitants of the area now known as Humboldt County include the Algic-speaking Wiyot and Yurok; Athabaskan peoples including the Hupa, Chilula, Whilkut, Tsnungwe, Mattole, Wailaki and Nongatl; and the Karuk, who speak an isolated language.

Spanish traders made unintended visits to California with the Manila Galleons on their return trips from the Philippines beginning in 1565. The first recorded entry by people of European origin was a landing by the Spanish in 1775 in Trinidad.

The first recorded entry of Humboldt Bay by non-natives was an 1806 visit from a sea otter hunting party from Sitka employed by the Russian-American Company. The party included New England captain Jonathan Winship, Russian supervisors, and Aleut hunters. The bay was not visited again by people of European origin until 1849 when Josiah Gregg's party arrived. The following year Douglas Ottinger and Hans Buhne sailed the schooner Laura Virginia into the bay. One of the pioneering passengers, Steven W. Shaw, proposed that the Laura Virginia Association name the bay Humboldt in honor of the naturalist and explorer Alexander von Humboldt. The name was later applied to the county as a whole.

The area around Humboldt Bay was once solely inhabited by the Wiyot Native American tribe. One of the largest Wiyot villages, Tolowot, was located on Tuluwat Island (formerly Indian Island). Founded around 900 BC, it contains a shell shell midden 6 acres (2.4 ha) in size and 14 feet (4.3 m) deep. It was the site of the February 26, 1860, massacre of the Wiyot people that was recorded by Bret Harte, then living in Union, now called Arcata. Between 60 and 200 Wiyot men, women, and children were murdered that night in the midst of a religious ceremony. Tolowot is now a restricted site and a National Historic Landmark. In 2019, the Eureka City Council restored ownership of the island to the Wiyot tribe.

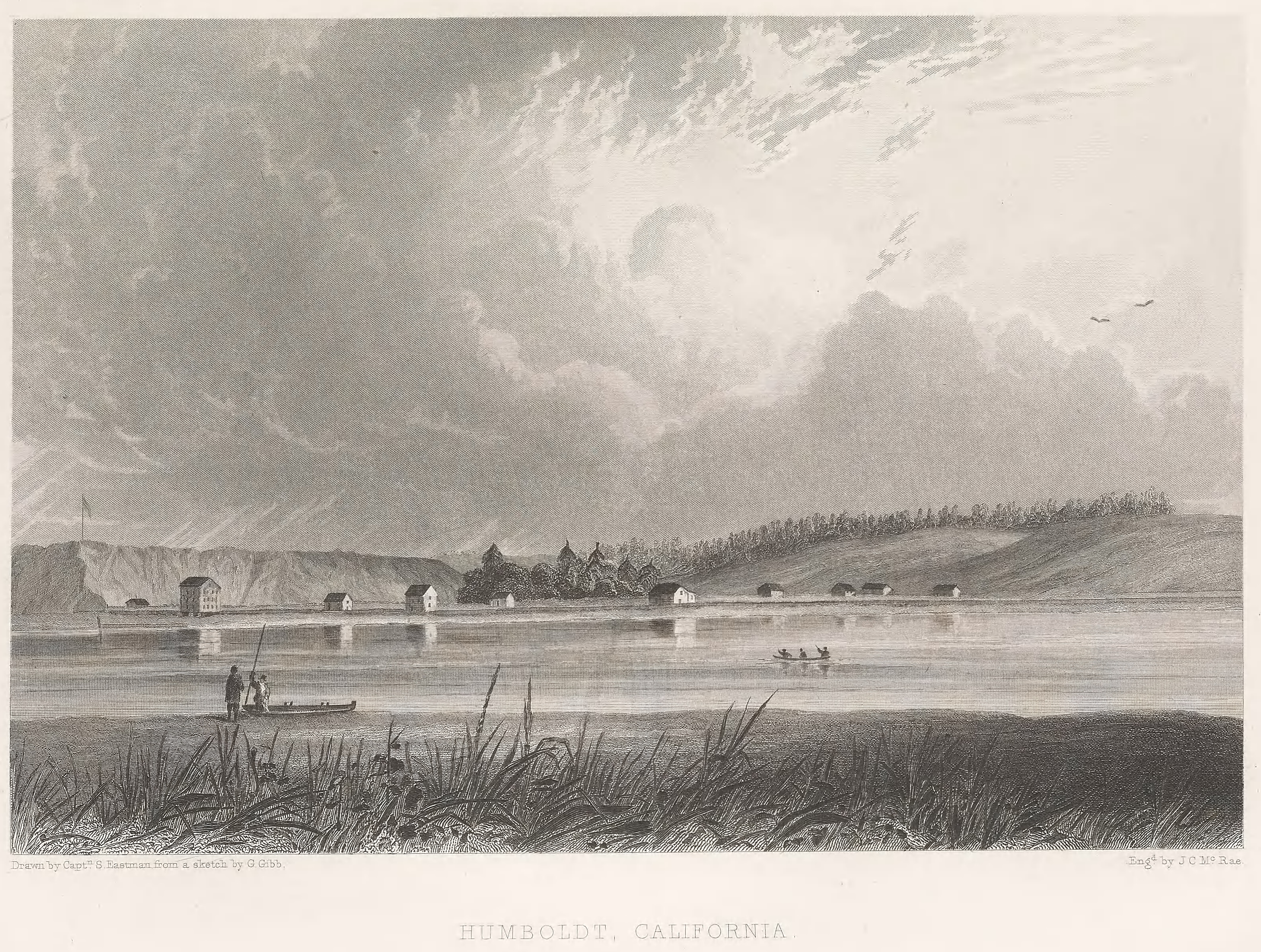
Humboldt, from a drawing made before 1854

Humboldt County was formed in 1853 from a portion of neighboring Trinity County.

State historic landmarks in Humboldt County include Arcata and Mad River Railroad, California's First Drilled Oil Wells in Petrolia, Camp Curtis, Centerville Beach Cross, the city of Eureka, the Victorian town of Ferndale, Fort Humboldt, Humboldt Harbor Historical District, the Jacoby Building, The Old Arrow Tree, Old Indian Village of Tsurai, the Town of Trinidad, and Trinidad Head.

On February 5 and 6, 1885, Eureka's entire Chinese population of 300 men and 20 women were expelled after a gunfight between rival Chinese gangs (tongs) resulted in the wounding of a 12-year-old boy and the death of 56-year-old David Kendall, a Eureka City Councilman. After the shooting, an angry mob of 600 Eureka residents met and informed the Chinese that they were no longer wanted in Eureka and would be hanged if they were to stay in town past 3 p.m. the next day. They were put on two steamships and shipped to San Francisco. No one was killed in the expulsion. Another Chinese expulsion occurred during 1906 in a cannery on the Eel River, in which 23 Chinese cannery workers were expelled after objections to their presence. However, some Chinese remained in the Orleans area, where some white landowners sheltered and purchased food for the Chinese mineworkers until after racial tension passed. Chinese people did not return to the coastal cities until the 1950s.

== Geography ==
According to the United States Census Bureau, Humboldt County encompasses 4,052 square miles (10,490 km^{2}), of which 3,568 square miles (9,240 km^{2}) is land and 484 square miles (1,250 km^{2}) is water.

Cape Mendocino is the westernmost point in California (longitude 124 degrees, 24 minutes, 30 seconds). Humboldt Bay, the only deepwater port between San Francisco and Coos Bay, Oregon, is located on the coast at the midpoint of the county.

Humboldt County contains a diversity of plant and animal species, with significant forest and coastal habitats. In coastal areas there are extensive redwood forests. A prominent understory shrub is the toyon, whose northern range limit is in Humboldt County.

=== Rivers ===
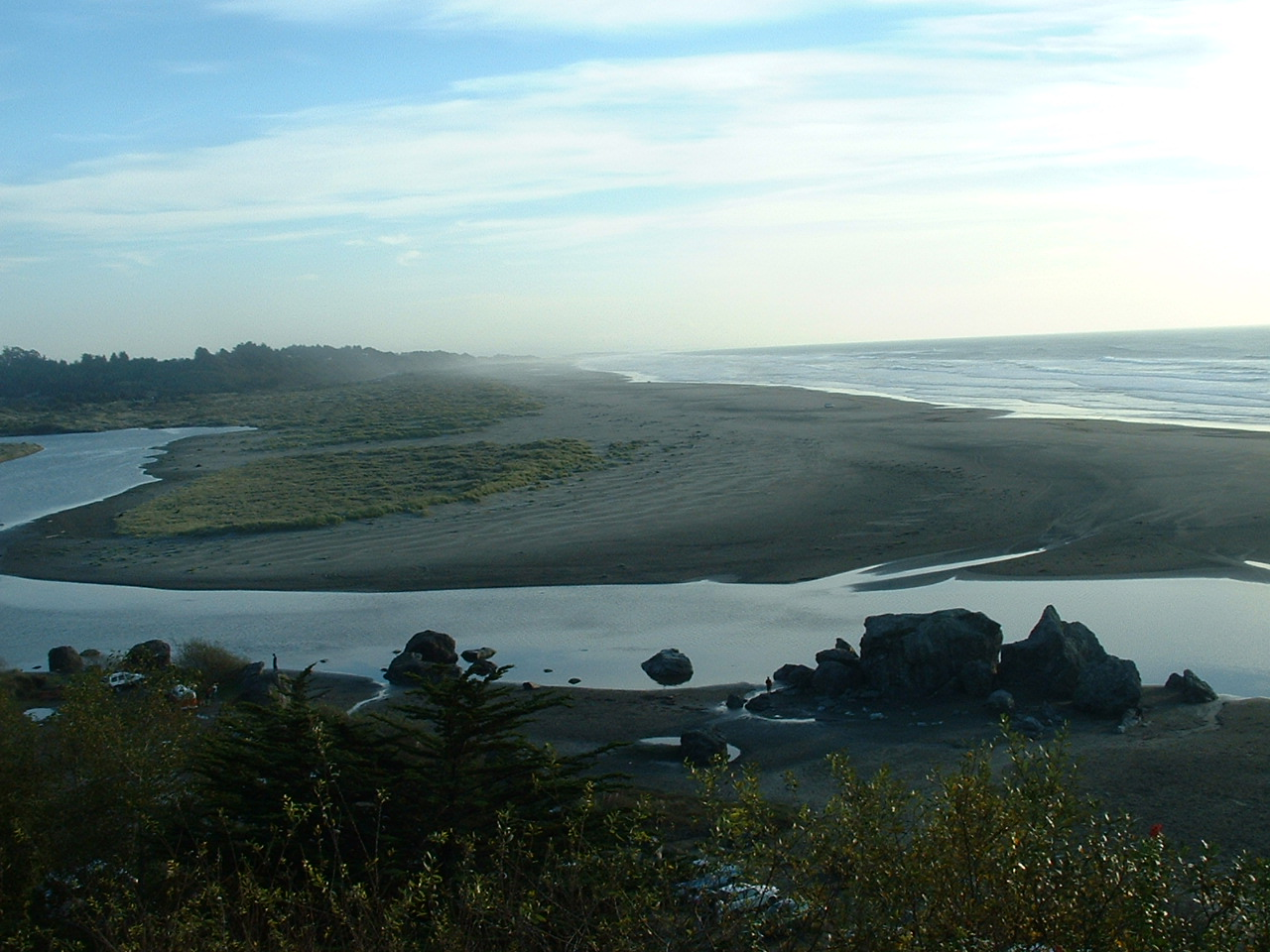
Mouth of Humboldt County's Little River on the Pacific Coast

Rockefeller Forest, the largest remaining old-growth Redwood forest on earth, is located within Humboldt Redwoods State Park.

Humboldt County's major rivers include (in order of flow – in cubic meters per second – from largest to smallest):

- Klamath River
- Eel River
- Trinity River
- Mad River

The smaller rivers include Redwood Creek, significant due to amount of its flow; the Van Duzen; the Eel River syncline group composed of the South Fork, the North Fork, and the Salt River; the Mattole, Salmon, Elk, Bear, and Little rivers.

=== Seismic activity ===
Historically, Humboldt County and the entire far north coast of California have had many earthquakes over 6.0 magnitude. The Mendocino fracture zone is in the area.

The 1992 Cape Mendocino earthquakes were a series of three major earthquakes that occurred off the coast of Cape Mendocino, California on April 25 and 26, 1992, the largest being a 7.2. Ninety-five people were injured and property in the county sustained considerable damage.

In 2010, a 6.5 magnitude earthquake struck offshore, 33 mi (53 km) west of Eureka, resulting in only minor injuries and some structural damage to houses and utilities, and no fatalities reported.

On December 20, 2021, a 6.2 earthquake centered off the coast of Cape Mendocino caused minor damage around the county. Exactly one year later on December 20, 2022, a 6.4 magnitude earthquake centered approximately 10 miles (16 km) from Ferndale caused greater damage, especially in Rio Dell, as well as two fatalities.

The 2024 Cape Mendocino earthquake was a M_{ww} 7.0 earthquake with an epicenter off the coast of Humboldt County.

The town of Arcata is built on top of an accretionary wedge. This was formed by the subduction of the Gorda plate under the North American plate.

=== Climate ===
The coastal zone of the county experiences very wet, cool winters and dry, mild foggy summers. In the winter, temperatures range from highs of 40–59 °F (4–15 °C) to lows of 32–49 °F (0–9 °C). Coastal summers are cool to mild, with average highs of 60–69 °F (16–21 °C) and frequent fog. Coastal summer temperatures range from highs of 64–70 °F (18–21 °C) to lows of 46–55 °F (8–13 °C). In the populated areas and cities near the coast, the highest temperatures tend to occur at locations just a few miles inland from Eureka and Arcata, in towns like Fortuna, Rio Dell, and smaller unincorporated communities located somewhat further away from Humboldt Bay. In these locations summer highs are 70–75 °F (21–24 °C). The coastal zone experiences a number of frosty nights in winter and early spring, though snowfall and hard freezes are rare. Coastal winters are cool and wet. Winter rainstorms are frequent, with averages from 30 to 100 inches (760 to 2,500 mm) a year, depending upon elevation.

Inland areas of the county also experience wet, cool winters. Snowfall is common at elevations over 3,000 ft (910 m) throughout the winter months, and is deep enough at higher elevations to have inspired the opening of a small ski lift operation (now defunct) on Horse Mountain, near Willow Creek, for several decades in the late 20th century. Summer displays the sharpest difference between the coastal and inland climates. Inland regions of Humboldt County experience highs of 80–99 °F (27–37 °C) depending on the elevation and distance from the ocean. Occasional summer highs of 100 °F (38 °C) are common in eastern and southern parts of the county including Orleans, Hoopa, Willow Creek, Garberville, Honeydew, and inland river valleys.

Average daily maximum and minimum temperatures for warmest and coldest months in selected settlements of Humboldt County
Location	Month	Temp (°F)	Temp (°C)	Month	Temp (°F)	Temp (°C)
Eureka	August	64/52	18/11	December	55/40	12/4
Arcata	September	62/51	17/11	December	54/38	12/3
Ferndale	August	71/52	22/11	December	56/39	13/4
Willow Creek	July	94/52	34/11	December	50/35	10/1
Garberville	August	87/53	31/12	December	49/37	9/3
Shelter Cove	August	69/53	21/11	January	57/45	14/7
Orick	August	69/49	21/9	January	52/37	11/2

== Demographics ==
Historical population
Census	Pop.	Note	%±
1860	2,694		—
1870	6,140		127.9%
1880	15,512		152.6%
1890	23,469		51.3%
1900	27,104		15.5%
1910	33,857		24.9%
1920	37,413		10.5%
1930	43,233		15.6%
1940	45,812		6.0%
1950	69,241		51.1%
1960	104,892		51.5%
1970	99,692		−5.0%
1980	108,514		8.8%
1990	119,118		9.8%
2000	126,518		6.2%
2010	134,623		6.4%
2020	136,463		1.4%
2025 (est.)	131,647	▼	−3.5%
U.S. Decennial Census; 1790–1960 1900–1990; 1990–2000 2010–2015

=== 2020 census ===
As of the 2020 census, the county had a population of 136,463. The median age was 39.1 years. 19.5% of residents were under the age of 18 and 19.1% of residents were 65 years of age or older. For every 100 females there were 98.6 males, and for every 100 females age 18 and over there were 97.1 males age 18 and over.

The racial makeup of the county was 71.9% White, 1.4% Black or African American, 6.2% American Indian and Alaska Native, 2.6% Asian, 0.3% Native Hawaiian and Pacific Islander, 5.7% from some other race, and 11.8% from two or more races. Hispanic or Latino residents of any race comprised 13.6% of the population.

68.5% of residents lived in urban areas, while 31.5% lived in rural areas.

There were 56,422 households in the county, of which 25.5% had children under the age of 18 living with them and 28.9% had a female householder with no spouse or partner present. About 31.7% of all households were made up of individuals and 13.0% had someone living alone who was 65 years of age or older.

There were 62,120 housing units, of which 9.2% were vacant. Among occupied housing units, 55.3% were owner-occupied and 44.7% were renter-occupied. The homeowner vacancy rate was 1.4% and the rental vacancy rate was 4.7%.

=== Racial and ethnic composition ===
Humboldt County, California – Racial and ethnic composition Note: the US Census treats Hispanic/Latino as an ethnic category. This table excludes Latinos from the racial categories and assigns them to a separate category. Hispanics/Latinos may be of any race.
Race / Ethnicity (NH = Non-Hispanic)	Pop 1980	Pop 1990	Pop 2000	Pop 2010	Pop 2020	% 1980	% 1990	% 2000	% 2010	% 2020
White alone (NH)	97,233	104,671	103,230	103,958	93,316	89.60%	87.87%	81.59%	77.22%	68.38%
Black or African American alone (NH)	530	934	1,035	1,393	1,729	0.49%	0.78%	0.82%	1.03%	1.27%
Native American or Alaska Native alone (NH)	5,714	6,188	6,722	6,961	7,454	5.27%	5.19%	5.31%	5.17%	5.46%
Asian alone (NH)	944	2,255	2,022	2,854	3,495	0.87%	1.89%	1.60%	2.12%	2.56%
Native Hawaiian or Pacific Islander alone (NH)	x	x	219	332	436	0.17%	0.25%	0.17%	0.25%	0.32%
Other race alone (NH)	357	81	448	368	1,091	0.33%	0.07%	0.35%	0.27%	0.80%
Mixed race or Multiracial (NH)	x	x	4,632	5,546	10,407	x	x	3.66%	4.12%	7.63%
Hispanic or Latino (any race)	3,736	4,989	8,210	13,211	18,535	3.44%	4.19%	6.49%	9.81%	13.58%
Total	108,514	119,118	126,518	134,623	136,463	100.00%	100.00%	100.00%	100.00%	100.00%

=== American Community Survey 2025 data ===
The United States Census Bureau estimated that in 2025, Humboldt County’s population was 131.647. It was also estimated that the county's population was 67,73% Non-Hispanic White, 15,25% Hispanic or Latino, 1,30% Non-Hispanic Black, 2,86% Asian, 5,56% Native American, 0,36% Pacific Islander, and 6,94% Multiracial.

Total	Population	Percentage
Non-Hispanic White	89.161	67,73%
Hispanic or Latino	20.077	15,25%
Non-Hispanic Black	1.708	1,30%
Asian	3.760	2,86%
Native American	7.326	5,56%
Pacific Islander	479	0,36%
Non-Hispanic Multiracial	9.136	6,94%

=== 2010 census ===
The 2010 United States census reported that Humboldt County had a population of 134,623. The racial makeup of Humboldt County was 109,920 (81.7%) White, 1,505 (1.1%) African American, 7,726 (5.7%) Native American, 2,944 (2.2%) Asian, 352 (0.3%) Pacific Islander, 5,003 (3.7%) from other races, and 7,173 (5.3%) from two or more races. Hispanic or Latino of any race were 13,211 persons (9.8%).

Population reported at 2010 United States census
The County	Total population	White	African; American	Native; American	Asian	Pacific; Islander	Other races	Two or more races	Hispanic or Latino (of any race)
Humboldt County	134,623	109,920	1,505	7,726	2,944	352	5,003	7,173	13,211
Incorporated city	Total population	White	African; American	Native; American	Asian	Pacific; Islander	Other races	Two or more races	Hispanic or Latino (of any race)
Arcata	17,231	14,094	351	393	454	35	769	1,135	2,000
Blue Lake	1,253	1,094	5	55	13	4	24	58	82
Eureka	27,191	21,565	514	1,011	1,153	176	1,181	1,591	3,143
Ferndale	1,371	1,281	1	22	20	2	17	28	77
Fortuna	11,926	9,686	73	444	106	9	1,065	543	2,032
Rio Dell	3,368	2,894	13	125	25	3	140	168	384
Trinidad	367	331	2	15	2	1	1	15	11
Census-designated place	Total population	White	African; American	Native; American	Asian	Pacific; Islander	Other races	Two or more races	Hispanic or Latino (of any race)
Alderpoint	186	170	0	9	1	0	1	5	10
Bayview	2,510	1,959	28	119	88	5	185	126	425
Benbow	321	294	0	2	1	0	13	11	25
Big Lagoon	93	73	0	11	0	0	1	8	11
Cutten	3,108	2,628	27	119	80	11	78	165	254
Fieldbrook	859	763	4	19	5	0	14	54	51
Fields Landing	276	210	6	13	21	1	6	19	18
Garberville	913	815	14	29	17	0	7	31	54
Humboldt Hill	3,414	2,853	41	119	102	2	129	168	298
Hydesville	1,237	1,108	4	33	6	0	30	56	71
Indianola	823	713	2	42	11	1	12	42	44
Loleta	783	643	12	16	5	0	65	42	114
McKinleyville	15,177	13,010	103	700	211	17	338	798	1,081
Manila	784	686	14	25	5	0	12	42	30
Miranda	520	439	4	13	4	1	31	28	75
Myers Flat	146	125	0	6	1	0	4	10	11
Myrtletown	4,675	3,969	53	142	155	19	126	211	387
Orick	357	288	0	39	0	3	6	21	20
Phillipsville	140	121	0	4	1	0	0	14	3
Pine Hills	3,131	2,648	22	86	116	4	72	183	220
Redcrest	89	73	0	5	0	0	3	8	4
Redway	1,225	1,093	5	35	6	1	15	70	96
Samoa	258	198	1	9	0	0	31	19	52
Scotia	850	674	3	35	3	9	90	36	150
Shelter Cove	693	630	3	5	7	1	13	34	47
Weott	288	252	0	13	1	0	3	19	20
Westhaven-Moonstone	1,205	1,083	9	39	18	0	10	46	53
Willow Creek	1,710	1,375	6	167	14	6	29	113	108
Unincorporated communities	Total population	White	African; American	Native; American	Asian	Pacific; Islander	Other races	Two or more races	Hispanic or Latino (of any race)
All others not CDPs (combined)	26,145	20,082	185	3,807	292	41	482	1,256	1,750

=== 2000 ===
As of the 2000 census, the population of Humboldt County was 126,518. As of that census, there were 51,238 households in Humboldt County, and the population density was 35 people per square mile (14 people/km^{2}). By 2006, the population was projected to have increased to 131,361 by the California Department of Finance. There were 55,912 housing units at an average density of 16 units per square mile (6.2 units/km^{2}). The racial makeup of the county was 84.7% White, 0.9% Black or African American, 5.7% Native American, 1.7% Asian, 0.2% Pacific Islander, 2.5% from other races, and 4.4% from two or more races. In 2017, 11.7% of the population were Hispanic or Latino according to the United States Census Bureau. 13.3% were of German, 10.7% Irish, 10.3% English, 7.4% American and 5.7% Italian ancestry according to Census 2000. 92.1% spoke English and 4.6% spoke Spanish as their first language.

There were 51,238 households, out of which 28.5% had children under the age of 18 living with them, 43.1% were married couples living together, 11.8% had a female householder with no husband present, and 40.2% were non-families. 28.9% of all households were made up of individuals, and 9.2% had someone living alone who was 65 years of age or older. The average household size was 2.39 and the average family size was 2.95.

In the county, the population was spread out, with 23.2% under the age of 18, 12.4% from 18 to 24, 27.4% from 25 to 44, 24.5% from 45 to 64, and 12.5% who were 65 years of age or older. The median age was 36 years. For every 100 females there were 97.7 males. For every 100 females age 18 and over, there were 95.6 males.

The median income for a household in the county was $31,226, and the median income for a family was $39,370. Males had a median income of $32,210 versus $23,942 for females. The per capita income for the county was $17,203. About 12.9% of families and 19.5% of the population were below the poverty line, including 22.5% of those under age 18 and 7.2% of those age 65 or over.

== Economy ==
Humboldt County contains redwood trees, and acres of private redwood timberland make Humboldt the top timber producer in California. The river bottoms adjacent to the ocean produce dairy products. Further inland, the warmer valleys have historically produced apples and other fruit. More recently, vineyards have been planted in the Trinity, Klamath, Mattole, and upper Eel river areas.

Notable local companies include:

- Cypress Grove Chevre
- Humboldt Creamery
- Lost Coast Brewery
- C. Crane Company
- Holly Yashi
- Eel River Brewing Company
- Six Rivers Brewery
- Restoration Hardware
- Pacific Lumber Company

=== Dairy ===
Humboldt County is known for its family-operated dairy farms. The Humboldt Creamery, a significant producer of high-grade ice cream and other dairy products, operates from the original headquarters located at Fernbridge adjacent to the Eel River.

=== Cannabis ===
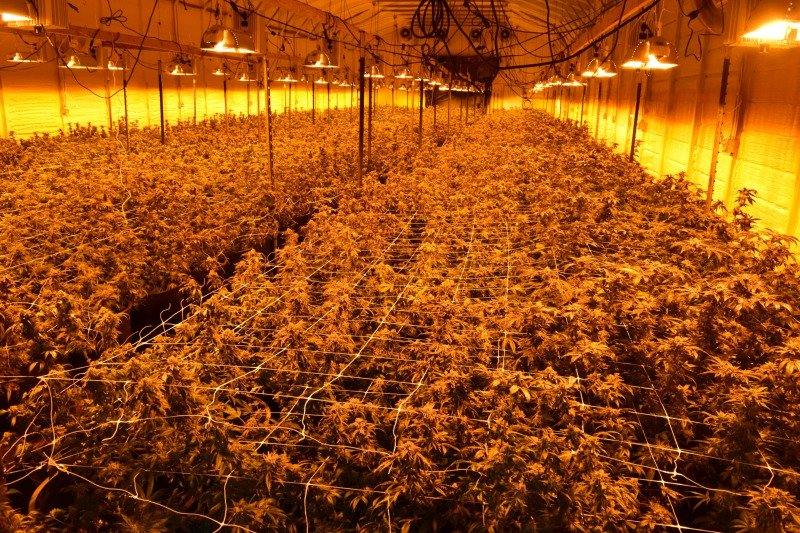
On May 26, 2020, deputies with the Humboldt County Sheriff's Office Marijuana Enforcement Team (MET) served one search warrant to investigate illegal cannabis cultivation in the Weitchpec area. Approximately 18,690 growing cannabis plants and 818 pounds (371 kg) of cannabis bud were destroyed.

As part of the Emerald Triangle, Humboldt County is known for its cultivation of cannabis, estimated to be worth billions of dollars. Proposition 215 allows patients and caregivers who are given a doctor's recommendation to legally (State level only) grow up to 99 plants in Humboldt County. However, in the years before Prop 215 (early 1970s – late 1980s), Humboldt County saw a large migration of the Bay Area counter-culture to the region. Many came looking to purchase cheap land, and ended up growing marijuana to pay for their land. Especially around Garberville and Redway, the rural culture and hippie scene eventually collaborated to create a rural hippie community in which marijuana became the center of the economy and the culture. Many people prospered by producing marijuana for California and other states because of its reputation for quality. A Redway radio station, KMUD, in the past has issued warnings and alerts to the region with information on whereabouts of law enforcement on their way to raid marijuana gardens.

The Campaign Against Marijuana Planting is the multi-agency law enforcement task force managed by the California Department of Justice, formed with the prime purpose of eradicating illegal cannabis production in California. The operations began in the late 1970s, named the Northern California Sinsemilla Strike Force in 1979, but the name CAMP became used after its official establishment in 1983. While the influence of CAMP in Humboldt County has waned with decriminalization of marijuana, there is a renewed interest at the state level regarding valid growing permits and environmental concerns. As a result, CAMP is today still used as a policing body, in accordance with the DEA. Yearly CAMP reports, published by the California Department of Justice, Bureau of Narcotic Enforcement (BNE) are available online through Cal Poly Humboldt's Special Collections. Starting in 1983, the annual reports detail the organizational structure and names of individual participants, a summary of the season's activities, tactics, and mention of special successes, trends and hazards.

County officials and the industry have encountered challenges in the transition from an illegal, underground economy to legal recreational cannabis sales that began in California in 2018.

As of 2023, the county has the largest cannabis farming industry in the Emerald Triangle. While the largest legal pot farm in the county was 8 acres (3.2 ha), a 2021 survey found the median pot farm site was 0.22 acres (0.09 ha).

=== Lead poisoning (2017–2018) ===
Humboldt County children are at greater risk of dangerously elevated blood lead levels than Flint, Michigan's – and almost double that of any other California county measured. The cases are concentrated in Eureka's Old Town and downtown areas and are largely due to old paint found in Victorian buildings.

== Parks and recreation ==
=== National protected areas ===
National Park

- Redwood National and State Parks – National Park Service

Conservation area

- King Range National Conservation Area and The Lost Coast – Bureau of Land Management

Recreation area

- Samoa Dunes Recreation Area – Bureau of Land Management

Forests

- Headwaters Forest Reserve – Bureau of Land Management
- Six Rivers National Forest – U.S. Forest Service
- Trinity National Forest – U.S. Forest Service

Wildlife refuge

- Humboldt Bay National Wildlife Refuge – Bureau of Land Management and U.S. Fish and Wildlife Service

=== State protected areas ===
Beaches

- Little River State Beach
- Trinidad State Beach

Parks

- Fort Humboldt State Historic Park
- Grizzly Creek Redwoods State Park
- Humboldt Lagoons State Park
- Humboldt Redwoods State Park
- Sue-meg State Park
- Prairie Creek Redwoods State Park
- Richardson Grove State Park
- Sinkyone Wilderness State Park

Tide pools

- Sue-meg State Park
- Moonstone Beach
- Indian Beach (also known as Old Home Beach)

Recreation areas

- Benbow State Recreation Area
- Harry A. Merlo State Recreation Area

Reserves

- Azalea State Reserve
- John B. Dewitt Redwoods State Reserve

=== County parks ===
- A. W. Way
- Big Lagoon County Park
- Centerville Beach
- Clam Beach
- Crab Park
- Freshwater County Park
- Hammond Trail
- Luffenholtz Beach
- Mad River, California
- Margarite Lockwood
- Moonstone Beach
- Van Duzen Pamplin Grove

== Arts and culture ==
- The Sequoia Park Zoo is the oldest zoo in California operating on a 7 acres (2.8 ha) facility operated by the City of Eureka in 60 acres (24 ha) Sequoia Park.
- The Clarke Historical Museum in Eureka, displays North Coast regional and cultural history in the repurposed Historic Register Bank of Eureka building.
- The Ferndale Museum, in Ferndale, houses and exhibits artifacts, documents and papers from settlement during the California Gold Rush to the 1950s covering the lower Eel River Valley.
- The Morris Graves Museum of Art conserves and displays the works of local artists in a restored Carnegie Library building.
- The Ferndale Repertory Theatre is the county's oldest theater company; it has been in operation since 1972 at the Hart Theater building in Ferndale.
- The Humboldt Crabs, founded in 1945, are the oldest continuously operated summer collegiate, wood-bat baseball team in the country.
- See also the List of museums in the North Coast (California).

== Government and policing ==
=== Administration ===
Humboldt County operates as a general law county under the California Constitution. That is, it does not have a county charter. the county is governed by a five-member Board of Supervisors. Supervisors are elected by districts for four year terms. There are no term limits in effect. The chairman and vice-chairman are elected annually by the Board of Supervisors from among its members.

=== Overview ===
Humboldt County is in California's 2nd congressional district, represented by Democrat Jared Huffman.

In the state legislature, Humboldt is part of the 2nd senatorial district, represented by Democrat Mike McGuire, and the 2nd Assembly district, represented by Democrat Chris Rogers.

Election audits in the county since 2008 have used a distinctive system which has spread elsewhere. They scan all ballots and release a file of the images with a digital signature, so candidates and the public can recount to find if the official totals are correct. They also release software to let the public tally the images electronically. The first time they did this they found the official software omitted 200 ballots.

=== Voter registration ===
Population and registered voters
Total population	133,585	
Registered voters (Note: Percentage of registered voters with respect to total population. Percentages of party members with respect to registered voters follow.)	79,708	59.7%
Democratic	33,155	41.6%
Republican	20,238	25.4%
Democratic–Republican spread	+12,917	+16.2%
American Independent	2,557	3.2%
Green	3,036	3.8%
Libertarian	801	1.0%
Peace and Freedom	342	0.4%
Other	222	0.3%
No party preference	19,357	24.3%

==== Cities by population and voter registration ====
Cities by population and voter registration
City	Population	Registered voters	Democratic	Republican	D–R spread	Other	No party preference
Arcata	17,118	71.9%	45.1%	10.2%	+34.9%	15.5%	32.2%
Blue Lake	1,336	61.4%	43.0%	20.4%	+22.6%	13.7%	26.1%
Eureka	27,027	53.6%	42.5%	25.3%	+17.2%	11.3%	24.1%
Ferndale	1,503	63.7%	39.4%	38.2%	+1.2%	7.5%	17.4%
Fortuna	11,753	54.6%	33.7%	38.1%	-4.4%	10.0%	22.0%
Rio Dell	3,342	50.9%	33.5%	35.3%	-1.8%	13.3%	23.1%
Trinidad	286	94.8%	52.8%	18.1%	+34.7%	9.2%	22.5%

=== Party preferences ===
From 1920 to 1984, the county was a noted bellwether area, voting for the national winner of every presidential election. Since 1988, Humboldt has swung heavily to the Democratic Party at the presidential and congressional levels, and is now one of the most Democratic areas in the state outside of the Bay Area and urban Southern California. The last Republican presidential candidate to win a majority in the county was Ronald Reagan, a Californian, in 1984.

In the late 1990s and early 2000s, Humboldt also had a substantial number of people affiliated with the Green Party, but that number has declined in recent years; however, the Green Party has had its best performance by presidential and gubernatorial candidates of any county in the United States in Humboldt County, with Jill Stein gaining her largest county-level number of votes in Humboldt in 2016.

United States presidential election results for Humboldt County, California
Year	Republican		Democratic		Third party(ies)	
Year	No.	%	No.	%	No.	%
1880	1,490	50.49%	735	24.91%	726	24.60%
1884	2,184	53.89%	1,450	35.78%	419	10.34%
1888	2,773	55.94%	2,014	40.63%	170	3.43%
1892	2,416	44.53%	1,844	33.98%	1,166	21.49%
1896	3,142	55.37%	2,465	43.44%	68	1.20%
1900	3,902	66.32%	1,698	28.86%	284	4.83%
1904	4,930	73.22%	1,249	18.55%	554	8.23%
1908	4,221	65.02%	1,206	18.58%	1,065	16.40%
1912	93	1.09%	2,887	33.76%	5,572	65.15%
1916	5,786	51.14%	4,103	36.27%	1,424	12.59%
1920	6,528	69.89%	1,778	19.04%	1,034	11.07%
1924	6,767	56.82%	845	7.09%	4,298	36.09%
1928	9,162	69.75%	3,726	28.37%	247	1.88%
1932	6,795	42.22%	8,723	54.20%	577	3.58%
1936	6,808	35.97%	11,909	62.93%	208	1.10%
1940	9,470	43.00%	12,329	55.98%	225	1.02%
1944	9,127	42.93%	12,083	56.83%	50	0.24%
1948	10,979	47.19%	11,268	48.43%	1,019	4.38%
1952	19,949	60.10%	12,949	39.01%	293	0.88%
1956	19,019	52.57%	17,025	47.06%	133	0.37%
1960	18,074	46.71%	20,391	52.70%	226	0.58%
1964	12,909	33.53%	25,515	66.27%	75	0.19%
1968	16,719	46.17%	16,476	45.50%	3,019	8.34%
1972	22,345	48.83%	21,132	46.18%	2,286	5.00%
1976	18,034	41.58%	23,500	54.18%	1,838	4.24%
1980	24,047	49.39%	17,113	35.15%	7,532	15.47%
1984	27,832	51.64%	25,217	46.79%	842	1.56%
1988	21,460	41.15%	29,781	57.11%	905	1.74%
1992	18,299	30.49%	28,854	48.07%	12,868	21.44%
1996	19,803	35.52%	24,628	44.17%	11,326	20.31%
2000	23,219	41.48%	24,851	44.40%	7,902	14.12%
2004	25,714	39.03%	37,988	57.66%	2,184	3.31%
2008	21,713	34.07%	39,692	62.28%	2,322	3.64%
2012	18,825	32.76%	34,457	59.96%	4,188	7.29%
2016	18,373	31.01%	33,200	56.04%	7,673	12.95%
2020	21,770	31.62%	44,768	65.03%	2,305	3.35%
2024	21,559	33.56%	39,800	61.96%	2,873	4.47%

== Crime ==
In 2018, Humboldt County was featured in the Netflix documentary Murder Mountain which highlighted the county's marijuana industry, violent crime and missing person cases.

As of 2022, Humboldt County ranked fourth out of California's 58 counties in missing adults per capita. (See table below)

Missing Adults By California County (2022)
County	Population	Total Missing	Voluntarily Missing	Percent of Total Voluntarily Missing	Total Missing per 1000
Trinity	15,889	37	20	54.1%	2.33
Modoc	8,651	18	15	83.3%	2.08
San Francisco	851,036	1653	1608	97.3%	1.94
Humboldt	136,132	239	132	55.2%	1.76
Sacramento	1,579,211	2629	2350	89.4%	1.66
Siskiyou	44,049	71	43	60.6%	1.61
Kern	906,883	1458	1370	94.0%	1.61
Del Norte	27,462	44	40	90.9%	1.60
Shasta	181,852	282	243	86.2%	1.55
Tehama	65,484	101	82	81.2%	1.54
San Luis Obispo	281,712	420	408	97.1%	1.49
Santa Cruz	268,571	393	344	87.5%	1.46
Yolo	217,141	315	240	76.2%	1.45
Stanislaus	552,063	793	663	83.6%	1.44
San Bernardino	2,180,563	2942	2537	86.2%	1.35
Fresno	1,008,280	1333	1101	82.6%	1.32
Imperial	179,578	235	164	69.8%	1.31
Sutter	99,101	129	82	63.6%	1.30
Lake	68,024	86	67	77.9%	1.26
San Joaquin	779,445	963	920	95.5%	1.24
Tuolumne	54,993	65	55	84.6%	1.18
Alameda	1,663,823	1867	1409	75.5%	1.12
Mariposa	17,130	19	9	47.4%	1.11
Merced	282,290	308	206	66.9%	1.09
Butte	213,605	231	142	61.5%	1.08
Madera	157,243	170	114	67.1%	1.08
Plumas	19,650	21	9	42.9%	1.07
Yuba	81,705	86	68	79.1%	1.05
Solano	450,995	470	395	84.0%	1.04
Sierra	2,916	3	2	66.7%	1.03
Los Angeles	9,936,690	10132	9109	89.9%	1.02
Nevada	102,322	99	88	88.9%	0.97
San Diego	3,289,701	3154	2991	94.8%	0.96
Santa Barbara	445,213	426	375	88.0%	0.96
Inyo	18,829	18	5	27.8%	0.96
Riverside	2,429,487	2280	2172	95.3%	0.94
Marin	260,485	244	208	85.2%	0.94
Calaveras	45,674	42	38	90.5%	0.92
Tulare	473,446	434	379	87.3%	0.92
Sonoma	488,436	417	325	77.9%	0.85
Monterey	437,609	369	319	86.4%	0.84
Mono	13,219	11	5	45.5%	0.83
Santa Clara	1,916,831	1584	1239	78.2%	0.83
Contra Costa	1,162,648	956	851	89.0%	0.82
Ventura	842,009	677	600	88.6%	0.80
Placer	406,608	322	210	65.2%	0.79
Orange	3,175,227	2457	2272	92.5%	0.77
San Mateo	754,250	580	518	89.3%	0.77
Lassen	31,873	23	15	65.2%	0.72
El Dorado	191,713	134	109	81.3%	0.70
Glenn	28,657	19	5	26.3%	0.66
Kings	152,515	93	84	90.3%	0.61
San Benito	64,753	35	24	68.6%	0.54
Amador	40,577	21	17	81.0%	0.52
Napa	137,384	68	51	75.0%	0.49
Mendocino	91,145	30	17	56.7%	0.33
Colusa	21,811	7	5	71.4%	0.32
Alpine	1,515	0	0		0.00

The following table includes the number of incidents reported and the rate per 1,000 persons for each type of offense.

Population and crime rates
Population	133,585	
Violent crime	541	4.05
Homicide	8	0.06
Forcible rape	33	0.25
Robbery	117	0.88
Aggravated assault	383	2.87
Property crime	2,270	16.99
Burglary	1,057	7.91
Larceny-theft (Note: Only larceny-theft cases involving property over $400 in value are reported as property crimes.)	2,513	18.81
Motor vehicle theft	475	3.56
Arson	51	0.38

=== Cities by population and crime rates ===
Cities by population and crime rates
City	Population	Violent crimes	Violent crime rate per 1,000 persons	Property crimes	Property crime rate per 1,000 persons
Arcata	18,332	72	3.92	605	33.00
Eureka	26,973	195	7.23	1,350	50.05
Ferndale	1,363	4	2.93	24	17.61
Fortuna	12,317	28	2.27	317	25.74
Rio Dell	3,392	11	3.24	61	17.98

== Education ==
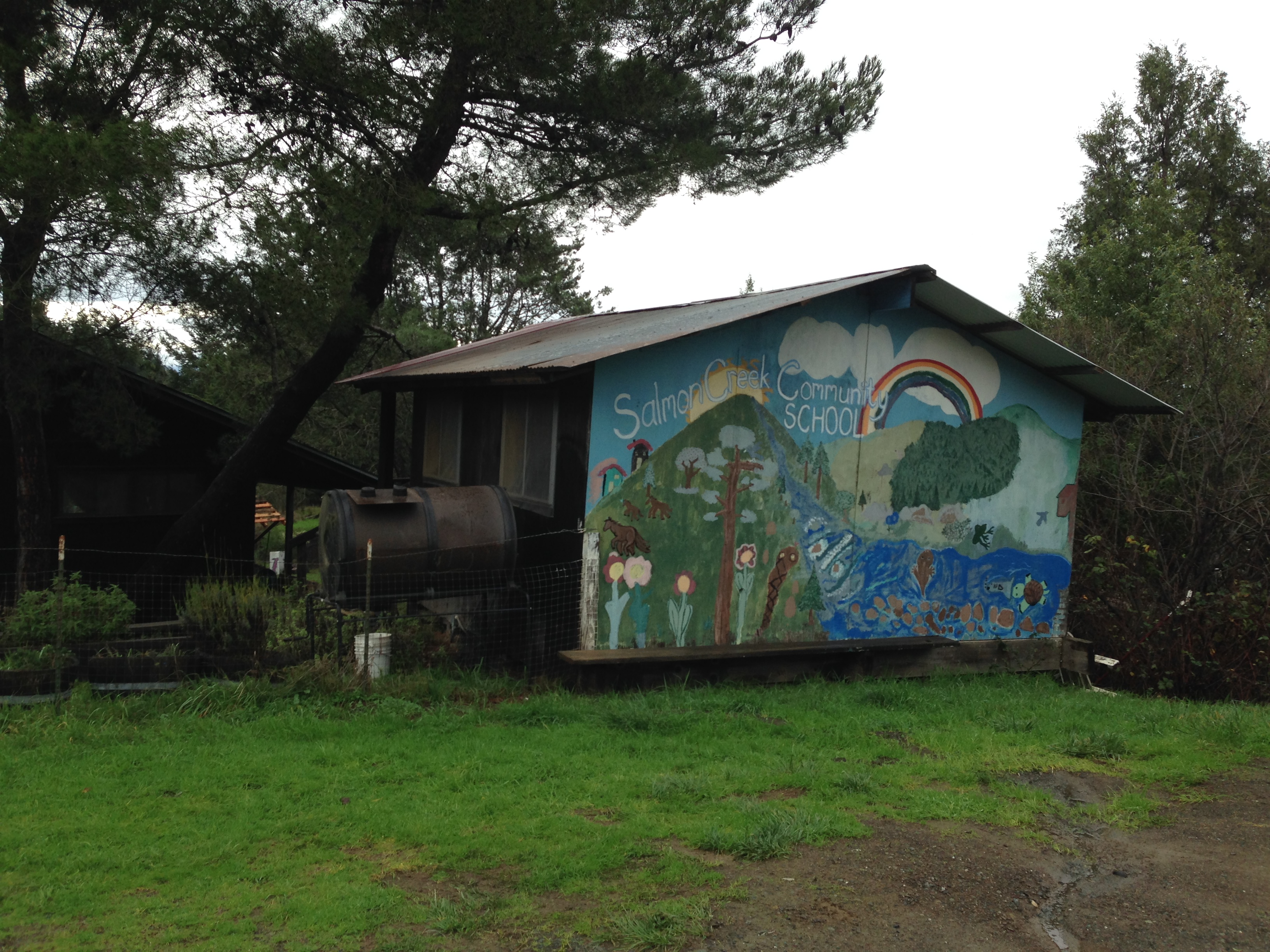
Salmon Creek Community School, Humboldt County, California

The List of schools in Humboldt County, California shows the many school districts, including charter and private schools, at the elementary and high school level. Post-secondary education is offered locally at the College of the Redwoods and California State Polytechnic University, Humboldt (Cal Poly Humboldt). Blue Lake's Dell'Arte International School of Physical Theatre offers accredited three-year Masters of Fine Arts degrees in Ensemble Based Physical Theatre. Humboldt County has the lowest starting teacher pay scale in the whole state of California.

== Media ==
=== Print ===
The Times-Standard is the only daily newspaper in the region; in continuous publication since 1854, and owned by Media News Group since 1996, They also print three weeklies: the Redwood Times, the Tri-City Weekly, and Northcoast 101. Other local publications include The Independent, the North Coast Journal, the Ferndale Enterprise, the Two Rivers Tribune, the Isis Scrolls, and The Lumberjack. The Arcata Eye and the McKinleyville Press merged in August 2013 to form the Mad River Union.

=== Television ===
Humboldt County's locally produced television stations, NBC station KIEM and PBS member station KEET, are based in Eureka. KIEM produces the only local TV newscast and KEET is the only PBS station in the region. Since 2017, CBS affiliate KVIQ has been a low-powered station operated as part of a duopoly with KIEM, sharing the same studios.

Other television stations in the area are semi-satellites of stations based outside of Eureka. Roar owned-and-operated station KBVU, a semi-satellite of KCVU, is based in Chico and ABC/Fox affiliate KAEF, a semi-satellite of KRCR-TV, is based in Redding. In previous decades all major networks had production capacity in Eureka.

=== Radio ===
==== For-profit ====
- KATA
- KEKA,
- KFMI
- KEJB
- KHUM
- KINS-FM
- KISS
- KKHB
- KLGE
- KRED
- KSLG-FM
- KWPT
- KWSW

==== Non-profit ====
- KIDE
- KHSU
- KKDS-LP
- KMUD
- KMUE
- KNHM
- KNHT
- KRFH-LP

=== Community media ===
Community broadband networks and public, educational, and government access (PEG) cable TV channels provide air time for local voices on Access Humboldt. Cable TV channels are carried by Suddenlink Communications and local programs are provided online through the Community Media Archive. The Digital Redwoods initiative of Access Humboldt is developing local networks to meet comprehensive community needs, including public, education and government purposes.

== Transportation ==
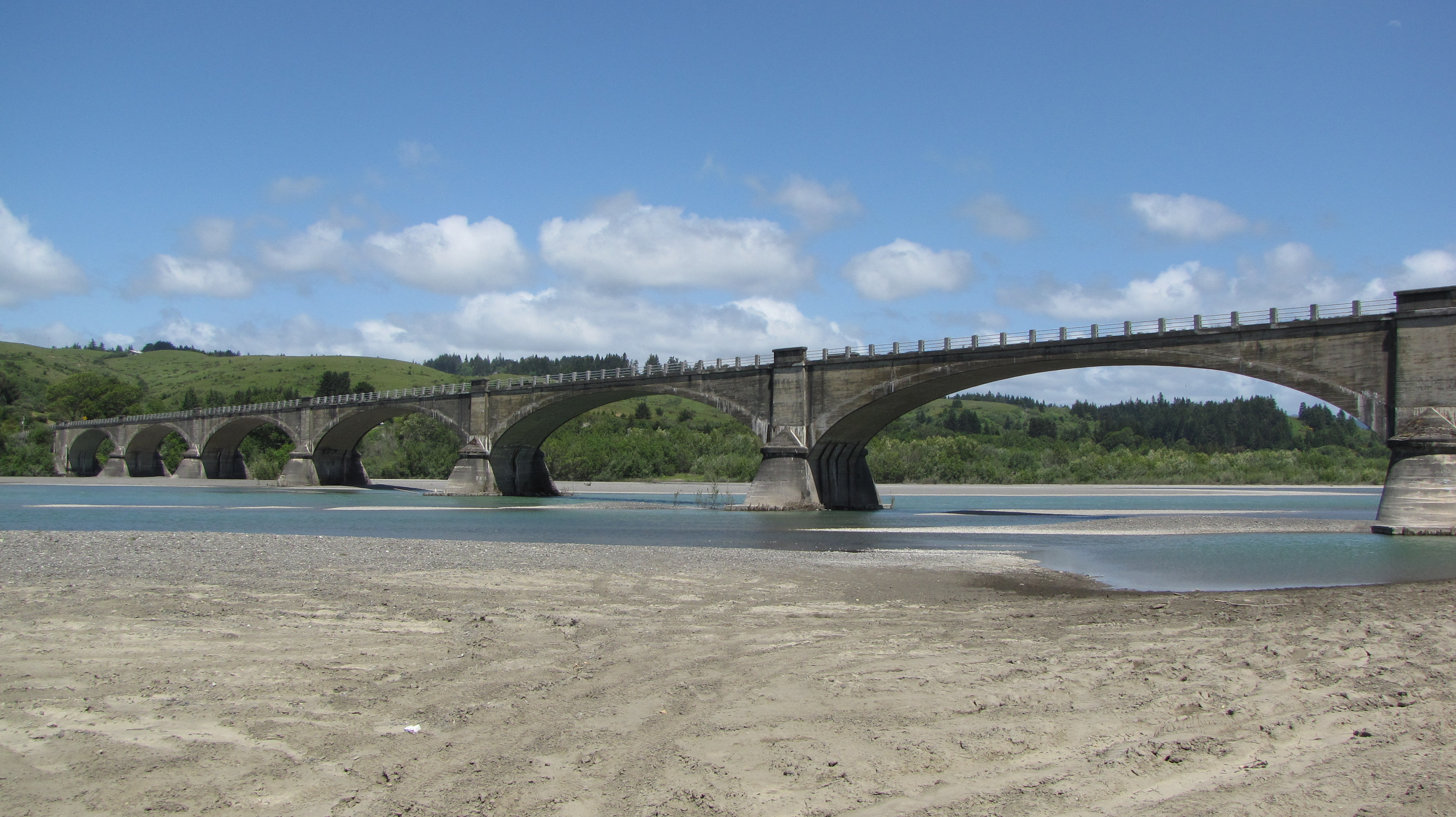
Historic Fernbridge (1911) on the road to Ferndale – California State Route 211

=== Major highways ===
- U.S. Route 101
- State Route 36
- State Route 96
- State Route 169
- State Route 200
- State Route 211
- State Route 254 – Avenue of the Giants
- State Route 255
- State Route 271
- State Route 283
- State Route 299

=== Public transportation ===
- Humboldt Transit Authority operates two fixed route transit bus systems:
  - Redwood Transit System provides intercity service to and within communities between Trinidad and Garberville, including Manila, King Salmon, Field's Landing, Loleta, Fernbridge and Fortuna. HTA also offers service between McKinleyville or Arcata and Willow Creek and an express bus between Arcata and College of the Redwoods when classes are in session.
  - Eureka Transit Service, operated in the City of Eureka, provides local service on four scheduled routes (one hour headway) in Eureka and its adjacent unincorporated communities. Connections can be made to the Redwood Transit System at several places in Eureka.
- Arcata and Mad River Transit System, operated by the City of Arcata with funding from Cal Poly Humboldt. A&MRTS provides fixed route local bus service on two scheduled routes (one hour headway) in Arcata and an additional route between the Valley West Neighborhood and the university when classes are in session.
- The city of Blue Lake and the Blue Lake Rancheria operates the Blue Lake Rancheria Transit Authority. This provides fixed route intercity transit bus service (one hour headway) between Arcata and the Blue Lake Rancheria Indian Reservation and casino and local service within the city of Blue Lake.
- Del Norte County's Redwood Coast Transit operates fixed route intercity transit bus service between Arcata and Crescent City or Smith River.
- Amtrak Thruway provides bus service to many towns in the region, including Eureka, Arcata, and Fortuna, connecting to train service at the Martinez station, in the Bay Area.
- The North State Express (NSE) is a proposed express bus service connecting the four corners of the US101, I-5, SR299, and SR20 corridors with each other and with Sacramento and the Bay Area.

=== Airports ===
Arcata-Eureka Airport is located in McKinleyville (north of Arcata). Commercial flights are available. Other general aviation airports are located at Dinsmore, Garberville, Kneeland, Murray Field (Eureka), Samoa Field and Rohnerville (Fortuna).

=== Seaport ===
The Port of Humboldt Bay is on Humboldt Bay, California's second largest natural bay.

== Events ==
Name	Month	Location	Citation
Apple Harvest Festival	October	Fortuna	
Arcata Oyster Festival	June	Arcata Plaza	
Azalea Festival	June	McKinleyville	
Avenue of the Giants Marathon	May	Humboldt Redwood State Park	
Blackberry Festival	July	Westhaven	
Blues by the Bay	July	Eureka	
Brew at the Zoo	May	Eureka	
Chicken Wingfest	September	Eureka	
Craftsman's Days	November	Eureka	
College of the Redwoods Wood Fair	June	Eureka	
Ferndale Concours on Main Car Show	September	Ferndale	
Ferndale Pet Parade	June	Ferndale	
Foggy Bottom Milk Run	March	Ferndale	
Fortuna Rodeo	July	Fortuna	
Fourth of July Festival	July 4	Old Town Eureka	
Humboldt Pride	September	Arcata	
Godwit Days (Birding festival)	April	Arcata	
Humboldt Arts Festival	May	Arcata/Blue Lake	
Humboldt County Cup	November	Eureka	
Humboldt County Fair	August	Ferndale	
Humboldt Film Festival	March & April	Arcata	
Humboldt Juggling Festival	April/May	Arcata (HSU)	
Humboldt Redwoods Marathon	October	Southern Humboldt	
Kinetic Grand Championship	May	Arcata to Ferndale	
Lighted Tractor Parade	December	Ferndale	
Lighting of America's Tallest Living Christmas Tree	December	Ferndale	
Lost Coast Kennel Club's Annual All Breed Show, Obedience, Rally, Agility Trails, Barn Hunt, FCATs	July	Ferndale	
Mushroom Fair	November	Arcata	
North Country Fair	September	Arcata	
Organic Planet Festival	September	Eureka	
Reggae on the River	August	French's Camp	
Redwood Acres Fair	June	Eureka	
Redwood AutoXpo	July	Fortuna	
Redwood Coast Jazz Festival	March	Eureka	
Redwood Region Logging Conference	March	Eureka, every other year	
Redwood Run	June	Southern Humboldt	
Rhododendron Festival and Parade	April	Eureka	
Roll on the Mattole	Summer	Mattole Grange	
Summer Arts and Music Festival	June	Benbow	
Swauger's Station Day	July	Loleta	
Tour of Loleta (by Bicycle)	July	Loleta	
Tour of the Unknown Coast (by Bicycle)	May	Southern Humboldt	
Trinidad Fish Festival	June	Trinidad	
Trinidad to Clam Beach Run	February	Trinidad	
Truckers Christmas Parade	December	Eureka	
Two Rivers Harvest Festival	October	Willow Creek	
Zootini	August	Eureka	
Redwood Coast Up in Smoke BBQ Competition	June	Blue Lake	

== In popular culture ==
=== Filming location ===
Ferndale, in southern Humboldt county, has been featured in such movies as The Majestic and Outbreak. It has appeared in made-for-television movies including Salem's Lot, A Death in Canaan, and Joe Dirt. It was also the location of the iconic "I'm a Pepper" commercial for Dr. Pepper.

Additionally the following films were shot in Ferndale: the science fiction horror cult film She Demons (1958), the award-winning short film Nonnie & Alex (1995), and the comedy-drama Kingdom Come (2001).

=== Television shows ===
Much of The WB's Hyperion Bay and the CBS show Blue Skies as well as an episode of Moonlighting were filmed in Humboldt County. The infamous Patterson-Gimlin film was filmed on Bluff Creek near Orleans, California.

Humboldt County has also been the subject of multiple documentary miniseries including Discovery Channel's Pot Cops and Netflix's Murder Mountain.

Humboldt County has also been featured in episodes of On the Case with Paula Zahn, The Profit, Hamilton's Pharmacopeia, Top Gear, The Tonight Show with Jay Leno, Survivorman, Diners, Drive-ins and Dives, Finding Bigfoot, Treehouse Masters, Rescue 911, Walking With Dinosaurs, Somebody's Gotta Do It, Monsters Resurrected, Weediquette, Dan Rather Reports, Monster Fish, Beachfront Bargain Hunt, and many more.

Ferndale was featured by Huell Howser in Road Trip Episode 149.

Humboldt County has also been the filming location for countless national television advertisements, including many major car commercials.

The Netflix series Virgin River is set in Humboldt County.

=== Books ===
In the book Lolita by Vladimir Nabokov there is a possible pun using the county's name (Humboldt) in connection to the main character's name (Humbert Humbert). This appears on page 108: "With the help of a guidebook I located [The Enchanted Hunters inn] in the secluded town of Briceland." This 'secluded town' could very well be a reference to the unincorporated Briceland of Humboldt County, making The Enchanted Hunters in 'Humboldt Land', continuing the novel's grotesque fairy-tale veneer.

Towards the end of the novel Parable of the Sower by late author Octavia E. Butler, characters relocate to Humboldt County, near Cape Mendocino. The beginning of the sequel novel, Parable of the Talents, takes place in Humboldt County and mentions several cities by name, including Arcata, Eureka, and Garberville.

== Communities ==
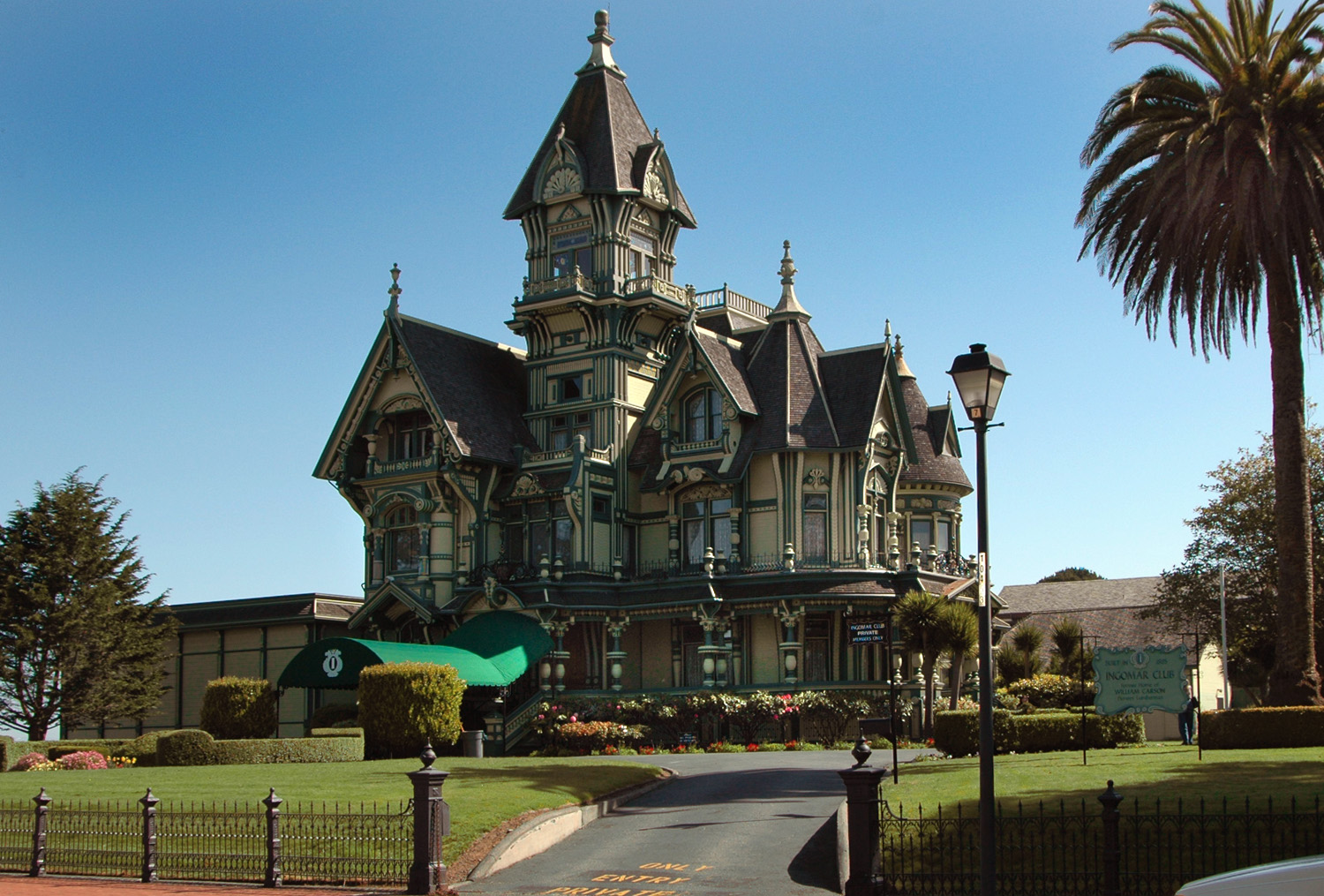
The Carson Mansion in Eureka (private)

=== Cities ===
- Arcata
- Blue Lake
- Eureka (county seat)
- Ferndale
- Fortuna
- Rio Dell
- Trinidad

=== Census-designated places ===
- Alderpoint
- Bayview
- Benbow
- Big Lagoon
- Cutten
- Fairhaven
- Fieldbrook
- Fields Landing
- Garberville
- Hoopa
- Humboldt Hill
- Hydesville
- Indianola
- Kep'el
- Loleta
- McKinleyville
- Manila
- Miranda
- Myers Flat
- Myrtletown
- Orick
- Phillipsville
- Pine Hills
- Redcrest
- Redway
- Samoa
- Scotia
- Shelter Cove
- Wautec
- Weitchpec
- Weott
- Westhaven-Moonstone
- Willow Creek

=== Other unincorporated communities ===
- Alton
- Bayside
- Blocksburg
- Briceland
- Bridgeville
- Carlotta
- Cooks Valley
- Dinsmore
- Dyerville
- Elk River
- Englewood
- Fernbridge
- Fort Seward
- Freshwater
- Freshwater Corners
- Fruitland
- Glendale
- Holmes
- Honeydew
- Johnsons
- King Salmon
- Kneeland
- Korbel
- Maple Creek
- Moonstone
- Orleans
- Patricks Point
- Pepperwood
- Petrolia
- Pine Hill
- Port Kenyon
- Ridgewood Heights
- Riverside Park
- Rohnerville
- Rosewood
- Shively
- Stafford
- Sunny Brae
- Westhaven
- Whitethorn

=== Indian reservations ===
Humboldt County has eight Indian reservations lying within its borders. Only four other counties in the United States have more: San Diego County, California; Sandoval County, New Mexico; Riverside County, California; and Mendocino County, California. The Hoopa Valley Indian Reservation is the largest in the state of California, a state that generally has small reservations (although numerous) relative to those in other states.

- Big Lagoon Rancheria
- Blue Lake Rancheria
- Hoopa Valley Indian Reservation
- Karuk Indian Reservation (partly in Siskiyou County)
- Rohnerville Rancheria
- Table Bluff Rancheria
- Cher-Ae Heights Indian Community of the Trinidad Rancheria
- Yurok Indian Reservation (partly in Del Norte County)

=== Population ranking ===
The population ranking of the following table is based on the 2010 census of Humboldt County.

† county seat

Rank	City/town/etc.	Municipal type	Population (2020 Census)
1	† Eureka	City	26,512
2	Arcata	City	18,857
3	McKinleyville	CDP	16,262
4	Fortuna	City	12,516
5	Myrtletown	CDP	4,882
6	Humboldt Hill	CDP	3,498
7	Rio Dell	City	3,379
8	Cutten	CDP	3,223
9	Pine Hills	CDP	3,186
10	Hoopa Valley Reservation	AIAN	3,173
11	Bayview	CDP	2,619
12	Willow Creek	CDP	1,720
13	Ferndale	City	1,398
14	Redway	CDP	1,247
15	Hydesville	CDP	1,244
16	Yurok Reservation (partially in Del Norte County)	AIAN	1,236
17	Blue Lake	City	1,208
18	Westhaven-Moonstone	CDP	1,187
19	Loleta	CDP	828
20	Fieldbrook	CDP	827
21	Garberville	CDP	818
22	Shelter Cove	CDP	803
23	Manila	CDP	798
24	Indianola	CDP	791
25	Scotia	CDP	681
26	Karuk Reservation	AIAN	578
27	Miranda	CDP	441
28	Benbow	CDP	422
29	Orick	CDP	328
30	Trinidad	City	307
31	Fields Landing	CDP	287
32	Samoa	CDP	229
33	Weott	CDP	219
34	Rohnerville Rancheria	AIAN	208
35	Big Lagoon	CDP	161
36 (tie)	Alderpoint	CDP	137
36 (tie)	Trinidad Rancheria	AIAN	137
38	Phillipsville	CDP	124
39	Table Bluff Reservation	AIAN	120
40	Blue Lake Rancheria	AIAN	112
41	Myers Flat	CDP	90
42	Redcrest	CDP	61
43	Big Lagoon Rancheria	AIAN	17

== Notable people ==
- Sara Bareilles
- Lloyd Bridges
- Hobart Brown
- Becky Chambers
- Wesley Chesbro
- Betty Kwan Chinn
- David Cobb
- Alexander Cockburn
- Trevor Dunn
- Guy Fieri
- Michael John Fles
- Brendan Fraser
- Robert A. Gearheart
- James Gillett
- Steven Hackett
- Bret Harte
- Dan Hauser
- El Hefe
- Julia Butterfly Hill
- John Jaso
- Christa Johnson
- Howard B. Keck
- Seth Kinman
- Naomi Lang
- Rey Maualuga
- Pamela McGee
- Mike Patton
- Maurice Purify
- Nate Quarry
- Eric Rofes
- Stephen W. Shaw
- Steve Sillett
- Trey Spruance
- Greg Stafford
- Robert M. Viale
- Don Van Vliet
- Stephen Girard Whipple
- Ned Yost

== See also ==
- Arcata and Eureka Community Recycling Centers
- Arcata Jacoby Creek Community Forest
- Arcata Marsh and Wildlife Sanctuary
- HSU First Street Gallery
- Humboldt Arts Council
- Humboldt County Historical Society
- Humboldt Crabs
- National Register of Historic Places listings in Humboldt County, California
- Operation Green Sweep
- California State Polytechnic University, Humboldt
- Lost Man Creek Dam
- Sequoia County, California
