= Myrtletown =

Myrtletown may refer to:

- Myrtletown, California, United States
- Myrtletown, Queensland, Australia
