= Sue-meg, California =

Unincorporated community in California, United States

Patrick's Point(The name Sue-meg only applies to the State Park) is an unincorporated community in Humboldt County, California. It is located 4.5 miles (7.2 km) north of Trinidad, at an elevation of 239 feet (73 m).

== See also ==
- Sue-meg State Park
