= Bayview, Humboldt County, California =

Bayview, California
- census-designated place
- Location in Humboldt County and the state of California
- Coordinates: 40°46′21″N 124°11′02″W
- Country: United States
- State: California
- County: Humboldt

Area
  - Total: 0.73 sq mi (1.90 km^{2})
  - Land: 0.73 sq mi (1.90 km^{2})
  - Water: 0 sq mi (0.00 km^{2}) 0%
- Elevation: 66 ft (20 m)

Population (2020)
  - Total: 2,619
  - Density: 3,578.7/sq mi (1,381.76/km^{2})
- Time zone: UTC-8 (Pacific (PST))
  - Summer (DST): UTC-7 (PDT)
- Zip code: 95503
- Area code(s): 707, 369
- FIPS code: 06-04478
- GNIS feature ID: 1655816

Bayview (also, Bay View) is a census-designated place (CDP) located adjacent to the City of Eureka, California, United States. Its population is 2,619 as of the 2020 census, up from 2,510 from the 2010 census. Many locals consider this area as part of "Pine Hill."

== History ==
A post office operated at Bayview from 1925 to 1935.

== Geography ==
According to the United States Census Bureau, the CDP has a total area of 0.7 square miles (1.8 km^{2}), all land.

== Demographics ==
Historical population
Census	Pop.	Note	%±
1990	1,318		—
2000	2,359		79.0%
2010	2,510		6.4%
2020	2,619		4.3%
U.S. Decennial Census; 1860–1870 1880-1890; 1900 1910 1920; 1930 1940 1950; 1960 1970 1980; 1990 2000 2010; 2020

Bayview was part of the Bayview-Rosewood-Cutten unincorporated community in the 1950 U.S. census (pop. 1,923); the Bayview-Rosewood unincorporated community in the 1960 U.S. census (pop. 2,980) after the community of Cutten was defined independently; and the Bayview-Pine Hills unincorporated community in the 1970 U.S. census (pop. 2,340). In the 1980 U.S. census the name Bayview did not appear although Pine Hills was listed as a census designated place (pop. 2,686). Bayview then was listed as a CDP in the 1990 U.S. census.

=== 2020 census ===
Bayview CDP, California – Racial and ethnic composition Note: the US Census treats Hispanic/Latino as an ethnic category. This table excludes Latinos from the racial categories and assigns them to a separate category. Hispanics/Latinos may be of any race.
Race / Ethnicity (NH = Non-Hispanic)	Pop 2000	Pop 2010	Pop 2020	% 2000	% 2010	% 2020
White alone (NH)	1,898	1,785	1,659	80.46%	71.12%	63.34%
Black or African American alone (NH)	13	23	44	0.55%	0.92%	1.68%
Native American or Alaska Native alone (NH)	107	95	73	4.54%	3.78%	2.79%
Asian alone (NH)	51	87	175	2.16%	3.47%	6.68%
Native Hawaiian or Pacific Islander alone (NH)	3	5	8	0.13%	0.20%	0.31%
Other race alone (NH)	5	1	13	0.21%	0.04%	0.50%
Mixed race or Multiracial (NH)	96	89	182	4.07%	3.55%	6.95%
Hispanic or Latino (any race)	186	425	465	7.88%	16.93%	17.75%
Total	2,359	2,510	2,619	100.00%	100.00%	100.00%

The 2020 United States census reported that Bayview had a population of 2,619. The population density was 3,577.9 inhabitants per square mile (1,381.4/km^{2}). The racial makeup of Bayview was 66.1% White, 2.0% African American, 3.9% Native American, 7.0% Asian, 0.3% Pacific Islander, 8.7% from other races, and 12.1% from two or more races. Hispanic or Latino of any race were 17.8% of the population.

The census reported that 99.7% of the population lived in households and 0.3% were institutionalized.

There were 1,050 households, out of which 27.7% included children under the age of 18, 35.3% were married-couple households, 14.1% were cohabiting couple households, 26.5% had a female householder with no partner present, and 24.1% had a male householder with no partner present. 29.5% of households were one person, and 12.4% were one person aged 65 or older. The average household size was 2.49. There were 587 families (55.9% of all households).

The age distribution was 22.4% under the age of 18, 8.7% aged 18 to 24, 29.7% aged 25 to 44, 24.1% aged 45 to 64, and 15.2% who were 65 years of age or older. The median age was 37.2 years. For every 100 females, there were 95.3 males.

There were 1,099 housing units at an average density of 1,501.4 units per square mile (579.7 units/km^{2}), of which 1,050 (95.5%) were occupied. Of these, 59.8% were owner-occupied, and 40.2% were occupied by renters.

== Politics ==
In the state legislature, Bayview is in the 2nd senatorial district, represented by Democrat Mike McGuire, and the 2nd Assembly district, represented by Democrat Chris Rogers.

Federally, Bayview is in California's 2nd congressional district, represented by Democrat Jared Huffman.
