= Kep'el, California =

Unincorporated community in California, United States

Kep'el, California Kepʼel (Yurok)
- Unincorporated community Census-designated place
- Location in California Kep'el, California (the United States)
- Coordinates: 41°17′2.91″N 123°49′8.43″W
- Country: United States
- State: California
- County: Humboldt

Area
  - Total: 3.646 sq mi (9.44 km^{2})
  - Land: 3.646 sq mi (9.44 km^{2})
  - Water: 0 sq mi (0 km^{2})
- Elevation: 866 ft (264 m)

Population (2020)
  - Total: 76
  - Density: 21/sq mi (8.0/km^{2})
- Time zone: UTC-8 (Pacific)
  - Summer (DST): UTC-7 (PDT)
- GNIS feature ID: 2813399

Kep'el is an unincorporated community and census-designated place (CDP) within the Yurok reservation in Humboldt County, California, United States.

As of the 2020 census, Kep'el had a population of 76.

Kep'el is located in the northwestern part of the state.

== Demographics ==
Historical population
Census	Pop.	Note	%±
2020	76		—
U.S. Decennial Census; 1850–1870 1880-1890; 1900 1910 1920; 1930 1940 1950; 1960 1970 1980; 1990 2000 2010; 2020

Kep'el first appeared as a census designated place in the 2020 U.S. census.

=== 2020 Census ===
Kep'el CDP, California – Racial and ethnic composition Note: the US Census treats Hispanic/Latino as an ethnic category. This table excludes Latinos from the racial categories and assigns them to a separate category. Hispanics/Latinos may be of any race.
Race / Ethnicity (NH = Non-Hispanic)	Pop 2020	% 2020
White alone (NH)	7	9.21%
Black or African American alone (NH)	0	0.00%
Native American or Alaska Native alone (NH)	56	73.68%
Asian alone (NH)	0	0.00%
Pacific Islander alone (NH)	0	0.00%
Other race alone (NH)	1	1.32%
Mixed race or Multiracial (NH)	8	10.53%
Hispanic or Latino (any race)	4	5.26%
Total	76	100.00%
