= Indianola, California =

Indianola
- census-designated place
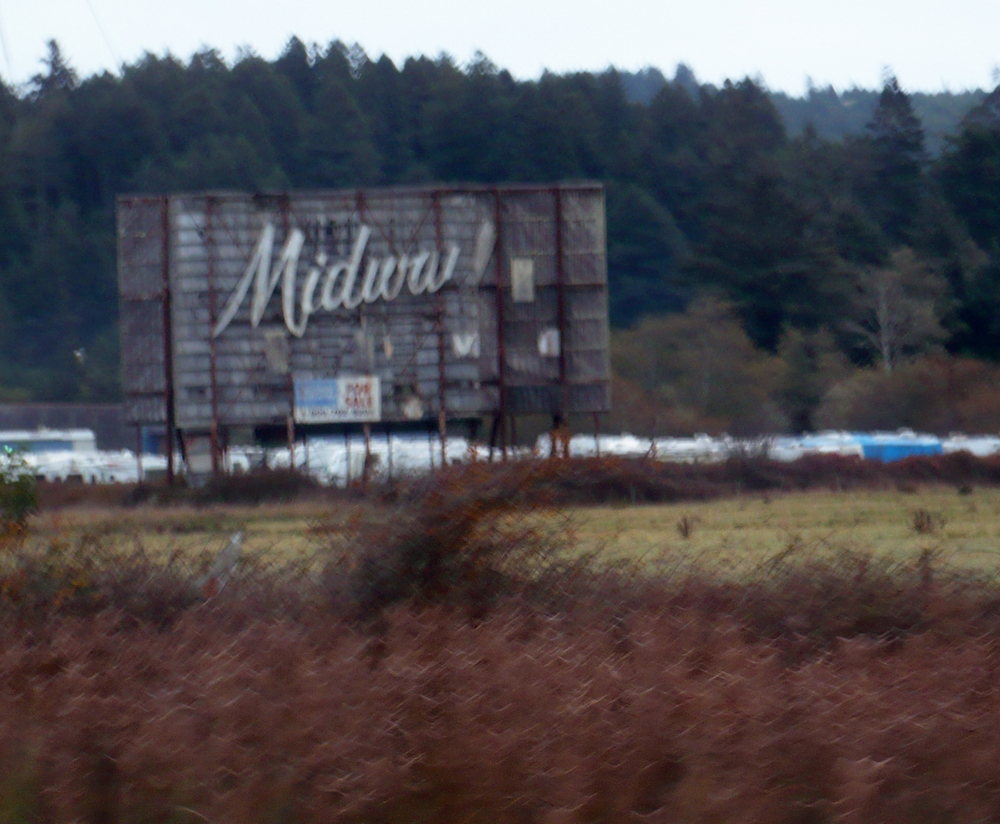
- former Midway Drive-In, Indianola

- Location in California
- Coordinates: 40°48′45″N 124°04′59″W
- Country: United States
- State: California
- County: Humboldt

Area
  - Total: 1.412 sq mi (3.657 km^{2})
  - Land: 1.412 sq mi (3.657 km^{2})
  - Water: 0 sq mi (0 km^{2}) 0%
- Elevation: 46 ft (14 m)

Population (2020)
  - Total: 791
  - Density: 560/sq mi (216/km^{2})
- Time zone: UTC-8 (Pacific (PST))
  - Summer (DST): UTC-7 (PDT)
- ZIP Code: 95503
- Area code: 707
- GNIS feature IDs: 1658821; 2628741

Indianola is a census-designated place in Humboldt County, California, United States. It is located 4 miles (6.4 km) south of Arcata, at an elevation of 46 feet (14 m). The place appears on the USGS Arcata South map. Addresses in this neighborhood are part of unincorporated Eureka, California, located entirely within the 95503 ZIP code. The population was 791 at the 2020 census.

An Indian settlement was located under the bluff which was a supply center which sold bay fish, clams, and crabs.

A post office operated at Indianola from 1900 to 1915.

== Demographics ==
Historical population
Census	Pop.	Note	%±
2010	823		—
2020	791		−3.9%
U.S. Decennial Census; 1860–1870 1880-1890; 1900 1910 1920; 1930 1940 1950; 1960 1970 1980; 1990 2000 2010

Indianola first appeared as a census designated place in the 2010 U.S. census.

The 2020 United States census reported that Indianola had a population of 791. The population density was 560.2 inhabitants per square mile (216.3/km^{2}). The racial makeup of Indianola was 611 (77.2%) White, 4 (0.5%) African American, 24 (3.0%) Native American, 11 (1.4%) Asian, 2 (0.3%) Pacific Islander, 36 (4.6%) from other races, and 103 (13.0%) from two or more races. Hispanic or Latino of any race were 91 persons (11.5%).

The whole population lived in households. There were 347 households, out of which 87 (25.1%) had children under the age of 18 living in them, 163 (47.0%) were married-couple households, 25 (7.2%) were cohabiting couple households, 68 (19.6%) had a female householder with no partner present, and 91 (26.2%) had a male householder with no partner present. 99 households (28.5%) were one person, and 38 (11.0%) were one person aged 65 or older. The average household size was 2.28. There were 229 families (66.0% of all households).

The age distribution was 167 people (21.1%) under the age of 18, 43 people (5.4%) aged 18 to 24, 135 people (17.1%) aged 25 to 44, 270 people (34.1%) aged 45 to 64, and 176 people (22.3%) who were 65 years of age or older. The median age was 49.3 years. For every 100 females, there were 95.8 males.

There were 387 housing units at an average density of 274.1 units per square mile (105.8 units/km^{2}), of which 347 (89.7%) were occupied. Of these, 265 (76.4%) were owner-occupied, and 82 (23.6%) were occupied by renters.

== Politics ==
In the state legislature, Indianola is in the 2nd senatorial district, represented by Democrat Mike McGuire, and the 2nd Assembly district, represented by Democrat Chris Rogers.

Federally, Indianola is in California's 2nd congressional district, represented by Democrat Jared Huffman.
