= Humboldt Hill, California =

Census-designated place in Humboldt County, California, U.S.

Humboldt Hill
- census-designated place
- Location in Humboldt County and the state of California
- Coordinates: 40°43′33″N 124°11′23″W
- Country: United States
- State: California
- County: Humboldt

Area
  - Total: 4.170 sq mi (10.800 km^{2})
  - Land: 4.155 sq mi (10.762 km^{2})
  - Water: 0.015 sq mi (0.038 km^{2}) 0.35%
- Elevation: 636 ft (194 m)

Population (2020)
  - Total: 3,498
  - Density: 841.8/sq mi (325.0/km^{2})
- Time zone: UTC-8 (Pacific (PST))
  - Summer (DST): UTC-7 (PDT)
- ZIP code: 95503
- Area code: 707
- FIPS code: 06-34928
- GNIS feature ID: 1867030

Humboldt Hill is a census-designated place (CDP) in Humboldt County, California, United States. Humboldt Hill rises to an elevation of 636 feet (194 m). The population was 3,498 at the 2020 census, up from 3,414 at the 2010 census. The area is in the 95503 zip code and part of unincorporated Eureka.

== Geography ==
According to the United States Census Bureau, the CDP has a total area of 4.2 square miles (11 km^{2}), over 99% land. The neighborhood of Spruce Point is located 1.5 miles (2.4 km) northeast of Fields Landing, at an elevation of 49 feet (15 m).

== Demographics ==
Historical population
Census	Pop.	Note	%±
1990	2,865		—
2000	3,246		13.3%
2010	3,414		5.2%
2020	3,498		2.5%
U.S. Decennial Census; 1860–1870 1880-1890; 1900 1910 1920; 1930 1940 1950; 1960 1970 1980; 1990 2000 2010; 2020

Humboldt Hill first appeared as a census designated place in the 1990 U.S. census.

=== Racial and ethnic composition ===
Humboldt Hill CDP, California – Racial and ethnic composition Note: the US Census treats Hispanic/Latino as an ethnic category. This table excludes Latinos from the racial categories and assigns them to a separate category. Hispanics/Latinos may be of any race.
Race / Ethnicity (NH = Non-Hispanic)	Pop 2000	Pop 2010	Pop 2020	% 2000	% 2010	% 2020
White alone (NH)	2,745	2,728	2,409	84.57%	79.91%	68.87%
Black or African American alone (NH)	27	41	56	0.83%	1.20%	1.60%
Native American or Alaska Native alone (NH)	100	107	165	3.08%	3.13%	4.72%
Asian alone (NH)	58	102	87	1.79%	2.99%	2.49%
Native Hawaiian or Pacific Islander alone (NH)	10	2	16	0.31%	0.06%	0.46%
Other race alone (NH)	5	1	21	0.15%	0.03%	0.60%
Mixed race or Multiracial (NH)	104	135	262	3.20%	3.95%	7.49%
Hispanic or Latino (any race)	197	298	482	6.07%	8.73%	13.78%
Total	3,246	3,414	3,498	100.00%	100.00%	100.00%

=== 2020 census ===
As of the 2020 census, Humboldt Hill had a population of 3,498 and a population density of 841.9 inhabitants per square mile (325.1/km^{2}). The median age was 41.1 years. 19.2% of residents were under the age of 18 and 21.6% were 65 years of age or older. For every 100 females, there were 96.7 males, and for every 100 females age 18 and over, there were 97.2 males age 18 and over.

The census reported that 94.2% of the population lived in households, 4.3% lived in non-institutionalized group quarters, and 1.5% were institutionalized. 93.2% of residents lived in urban areas, while 6.8% lived in rural areas.

There were 1,367 households, out of which 26.8% included children under the age of 18, 45.7% were married-couple households, 9.5% were cohabiting couple households, 26.4% had a female householder with no partner present, and 18.4% had a male householder with no partner present. 27.6% of households were one person, and 13.9% were one person aged 65 or older. The average household size was 2.41. There were 898 families (65.7% of all households).

There were 1,447 housing units at an average density of 348.3 units per square mile (134.5 units/km^{2}), of which 1,367 (94.5%) were occupied. Of these, 76.2% were owner-occupied, and 23.8% were occupied by renters. 5.5% of housing units were vacant. The homeowner vacancy rate was 1.0% and the rental vacancy rate was 4.0%.

=== Income and poverty ===
In 2023, the US Census Bureau estimated that the median household income was $85,438, and the per capita income was $38,088. About 10.5% of families and 15.2% of the population were below the poverty line.

=== 2010 census ===
The 2010 United States census reported that Humboldt Hill had a population of 3,414. The population density was 819.1 inhabitants per square mile (316.3/km^{2}). The racial makeup of Humboldt Hill was 2,853 (83.6%) White, 41 (1.2%) African American, 119 (3.5%) Native American, 102 (3.0%) Asian, 2 (0.1%) Pacific Islander, 129 (3.8%) from other races, and 168 (4.9%) from two or more races. Hispanic or Latino of any race were 298 persons (8.7%).

The Census reported that 3,187 people (93.4% of the population) lived in households, 145 (4.2%) lived in non-institutionalized group quarters, and 82 (2.4%) were institutionalized.

There were 1,325 households, out of which 360 (27.2%) had children under the age of 18 living in them, 653 (49.3%) were opposite-sex married couples living together, 143 (10.8%) had a female householder with no husband present, 66 (5.0%) had a male householder with no wife present. There were 112 (8.5%) unmarried opposite-sex partnerships, and 17 (1.3%) same-sex married couples or partnerships. 326 households (24.6%) were made up of individuals, and 151 (11.4%) had someone living alone who was 65 years of age or older. The average household size was 2.41. There were 862 families (65.1% of all households); the average family size was 2.87.

The population age distribution is 646 people (18.9%) under the age of 18, 374 people (11.0%) aged 18 to 24, 773 people (22.6%) aged 25 to 44, 1,024 people (30.0%) aged 45 to 64, and 597 people (17.5%) who were 65 years of age or older. The median age was 42.2 years. For every 100 females, there were 94.6 males. For every 100 females age 18 and over, there were 95.1 males.

There were 1,396 housing units at an average density of 334.9 per square mile (129.3/km^{2}), of which 1,325 were occupied, of which 1,016 (76.7%) were owner-occupied, and 309 (23.3%) were occupied by renters. The homeowner vacancy rate was 1.4%; the rental vacancy rate was 3.4%. 2,434 people (71.3% of the population) lived in owner-occupied housing units and 753 people (22.1%) lived in rental housing units.

== Politics ==
In the state legislature, Humboldt Hill is in the 2nd senatorial district, represented by Democrat Mike McGuire, and the 2nd Assembly district, represented by Democrat Chris Rogers.

Federally, Humboldt Hill is in California's 2nd congressional district, represented by Democrat Jared Huffman.
