= Arcata Community Recycling Center =

- Founded: 1971
- Purpose: Resource conservation through waste reduction
- Location: Arcata, California
- Region served: Northern Humboldt County, CA
- Revenue: non-profit
- Employees: 2 (late 2012)

The Arcata Community Recycling Center (ACRC), founded in 1971 as part of the Northcoast Environmental Center, is one of America's oldest non-profit recycling facilities. The center promotes environmental awareness in the North Coast and facilitates diversion of materials from landfills in Arcata and Eureka, California.

Saddled by debt associated with an $8 million construction project in neighboring Samoa, California and loss of a processing agreement with the local waste management authority, in January 2012 operations of the old ACRC and its Samoa facility were terminated. After 10 months during which the organization no longer processed recyclables, in November 2012 a new Arcata Community Recycling Center was launched in its historic Arcata location.

== History ==
=== Establishment ===
The Northcoast Environmental Center was established in Arcata, California in June 1971 by a coalition of six local environmental organizations. These included a group called Humboldt Organization for Protection of the Environment (HOPE), local chapters of the Sierra Club and Audubon Society, the Northcoast Rivers Association, the Phoenix Environmental Committee of the College of the Redwoods, and a student hiking club at Humboldt State University.

A space for the gathering of bottles, aluminum cans, and newspapers for recycling was obtained on A Street in Arcata, with a move made to a larger facility formerly occupied by the Arcata Transit Authority a few doors away made just weeks after the center's launch. At the time of launch aluminum cans were to be taken to a local beverage distributorship for recycling with glass and newspaper transported by rail to the San Francisco bay area for processing. Glass was stored offsite in 55-gallon steel drums until a sufficient quantity could be accumulated to fill a railway gondola car.

The center was entirely staffed by volunteer labor during its initial incarnation. Executive Director of the Northcoast Environmental Center from 1971 to 1974 was Wes Chesbro, later elected to the Humboldt County Board of Supervisors and the California State Assembly.

The recycling operation was spun off from the Northcoast Environmental Center as an independent entity called the Arcata Community Recycling Center (ACRC) about 1973, with the two organizations located side-by-side in Arcata.

=== Development ===
Operations moved to the current location at 9th & N St. in the early 1980s. In 2002, ACRC began operation of the Eureka Community Recycling Center adjacent to the Humboldt Waste Management Authority's Transfer Station located in Eureka.

The Reusables Depot Thrift Store, also at the 9th & N St. location, serves as a reuse center for unwanted household and sporting goods, building materials, and garden supplies.

In 2007 ACRC opened the 35,800 sq. ft. Samoa Processing Facility which houses a dual stream sorting line. This facility is a green building and is slated for LEED certification. Recyclables enter the facility in two streams, mixed papers and containers, from curbside collection and drop off sites and are sorted by material type using a combination of machine and people power. This facility diverted over 11,000 tons of materials from the landfill annually.

The Samoa site also served as home to the Bette Dobkin Education Center where students of all ages were able to learn about resource conservation.

=== Closure and relaunch ===
In November 2011, suffering from the dual blows of high loan repayment costs associated with the opening of its $8 million Samoa Processing Facility and loss of its processing agreement with Humboldt Waste Management Authority (HWMA) by being underbid by an outside company, an announcement was made by the RCRC's governing Board of Directors that the operations of the Arcata Community Recycling Center and its Samoa facility was to be terminated in January 2012. An effort was made for the Samoa facility to continue through a lease to the HWMA, but this effort ended in failure when no agreement between the two parties could be reached.

After 10 months during which no operations took place, on November 14, 2012, a new Arcata Community Recycling Center was relaunched in the same Arcata location as the former enterprise.

=== Closure ===
The site again closed in January 2016.

== See also challenges it faces ==
- Environment of California
