= Holly Yashi =

California-based jewelry designer

Holly Yashi, Inc.
- Type: Private
- Founded: 1981; 45 years ago
- Founder: Holly Hosterman and Paul Lubitz

Holly Yashi, Inc. is a jewelry designer and manufacturer located in the northern California town of Arcata.

== History ==
Holly Hosterman and Paul Lubitz founded Holly Yashi in their garage after graduating from Humboldt State University in 1981.

Holly Yashi produces handmade jewelry designed by Holly Hosterman, who has been recognized for her use of the metal niobium.

Holly Yashi is also known for its technical innovations in working with niobium, such as the development of proprietary hand-coloration and image-embossing processes, as well as the employment of a water jet which uses crushed garnets to produce filigree. Hosterman's designs have been sold by brands such as Anthropologie and featured in magazines such as Good Housekeeping. Her creations for Swarovski are now located in the Swarovski Museum in Austria.

Today Holly Yashi jewelry is sold and displayed in more than 1,100 galleries and boutiques nationwide and is also featured in magazines, television shows and movies.
