= Myrtletown, California =

Myrtletown
- Census designated place
- Location in Humboldt County and the state of California
- Coordinates: 40°47′19″N 124°07′49″W
- Country: United States
- State: California
- County: Humboldt

Area
  - Total: 2.18 sq mi (5.65 km^{2})
  - Land: 2.10 sq mi (5.44 km^{2})
  - Water: 0.081 sq mi (0.21 km^{2}) 3.8%
- Elevation: 112 ft (34 m)

Population (2020)
  - Total: 4,882
  - Density: 2,320/sq mi (897/km^{2})
- Time zone: UTC−8 (Pacific)
  - Summer (DST): UTC−7 (PDT)
- ZIP code: 95501
- Area code: 707
- FIPS code: 06-50188
- GNIS feature ID: 1867044

Myrtletown is a census-designated place (CDP) in Humboldt County, California, United States. Myrtletown lies at an elevation of 112 feet (34 m). Myrtletown is a part of the Eureka, California metropolitan area. The population was 4,882 at the 2020 census, up from 4,675 at the 2010 census.

== Geography ==
According to the United States Census Bureau, the CDP has a total area of 2.2 square miles (5.7 km^{2}), of which 2.1 square miles (5.4 km^{2}) is land and 0.08 square miles (0.21 km^{2}) (3.8%) is water.

=== Climate ===
Myrtletown enjoys a mild, temperate cool-summer Mediterranean climate (Köppen Csb).

Climate data for Mystletown (Eureka), California (1981–2010 normals, extremes 1886–present)
Month	Jan	Feb	Mar	Apr	May	Jun	Jul	Aug	Sep	Oct	Nov	Dec	Year
Record high °F (°C)	78 (26)	85 (29)	78 (26)	80 (27)	84 (29)	85 (29)	77 (25)	82 (28)	87 (31)	87 (31)	81 (27)	77 (25)	87 (31)
Mean maximum °F (°C)	64.6 (18.1)	65.3 (18.5)	65.8 (18.8)	66.4 (19.1)	68.0 (20.0)	67.9 (19.9)	67.2 (19.6)	68.9 (20.5)	72.6 (22.6)	72.9 (22.7)	68.5 (20.3)	64.8 (18.2)	77.3 (25.2)
Mean daily maximum °F (°C)	55.6 (13.1)	56.1 (13.4)	56.7 (13.7)	57.7 (14.3)	60.1 (15.6)	62.2 (16.8)	63.4 (17.4)	64.3 (17.9)	63.7 (17.6)	61.7 (16.5)	58.0 (14.4)	55.0 (12.8)	59.6 (15.3)
Daily mean °F (°C)	48.3 (9.1)	48.9 (9.4)	49.7 (9.8)	50.9 (10.5)	53.8 (12.1)	56.1 (13.4)	57.7 (14.3)	58.5 (14.7)	57.0 (13.9)	54.4 (12.4)	50.8 (10.4)	47.8 (8.8)	52.9 (11.6)
Mean daily minimum °F (°C)	41.1 (5.1)	41.7 (5.4)	42.6 (5.9)	44.1 (6.7)	47.5 (8.6)	50.1 (10.1)	52.0 (11.1)	52.8 (11.6)	50.4 (10.2)	47.1 (8.4)	43.5 (6.4)	40.6 (4.8)	46.1 (7.8)
Mean minimum °F (°C)	31.4 (−0.3)	32.9 (0.5)	34.6 (1.4)	37.1 (2.8)	40.9 (4.9)	45.0 (7.2)	47.9 (8.8)	48.5 (9.2)	45.0 (7.2)	40.2 (4.6)	35.2 (1.8)	32.1 (0.1)	29.3 (−1.5)
Record low °F (°C)	20 (−7)	24 (−4)	29 (−2)	31 (−1)	35 (2)	40 (4)	43 (6)	44 (7)	36 (2)	32 (0)	27 (−3)	21 (−6)	20 (−7)
Average precipitation inches (mm)	6.50 (165)	5.63 (143)	5.30 (135)	3.32 (84)	1.78 (45)	0.75 (19)	0.18 (4.6)	0.31 (7.9)	0.59 (15)	2.24 (57)	5.61 (142)	8.12 (206)	40.33 (1,024)
Average snowfall inches (cm)	0 (0)	0.2 (0.51)	0 (0)	0 (0)	0 (0)	0 (0)	0 (0)	0 (0)	0 (0)	0 (0)	0 (0)	0 (0)	0.2 (0.51)
Average precipitation days (≥ 0.01 in)	16.6	14.9	16.2	13.4	9.1	5.8	2.7	3.2	4.4	8.5	15.2	17.5	127.5
Average relative humidity (%)	82	81	82	82	83	85	87	88	85	83	83	82	84
Average dew point °F (°C)	41 (5)	41 (5)	42 (6)	43 (6)	46 (8)	50 (10)	52 (11)	53 (12)	51 (11)	48 (9)	45 (7)	41 (5)	46 (8)
Mean monthly sunshine hours	140.1	143.7	207.4	253.1	280.5	277.7	273.4	236.5	220.3	175.8	131.3	126.2	2,466
Percentage possible sunshine	47	48	56	63	63	62	60	55	59	51	44	44	55
Source 1: NOAA (sun and relative humidity 1961–1990)
Source 2: Time and Date (humidity and dew point 2005-2015)

== Demographics ==
Historical population
Census	Pop.	Note	%±
1950	1,727		—
1960	3,634		110.4%
1970	3,922		7.9%
1980	3,959		0.9%
1990	4,413		11.5%
2000	4,459		1.0%
2010	4,675		4.8%
2020	4,882		4.4%
U.S. Decennial Census; 1860–1870 1880-1890; 1900 1910 1920; 1930 1940 1950; 1960 1970 1980; 1990 2000 2010; 2020

Myrtletown first appeared in the 1950 U.S. census as an unincorporated community with the name Ryans Slough. In the 1980 United States census, its name was changed to Myrtletown.

=== Racial and ethnic composition ===
Myrtletown CDP, California – Racial and ethnic composition Note: the US Census treats Hispanic/Latino as an ethnic category. This table excludes Latinos from the racial categories and assigns them to a separate category. Hispanics/Latinos may be of any race.
Race / Ethnicity (NH = Non-Hispanic)	Pop 2000	Pop 2010	Pop 2020	% 2000	% 2010	% 2020
White alone (NH)	3,854	3,763	3,461	86.43%	80.49%	70.89%
Black or African American alone (NH)	35	47	81	0.78%	1.01%	1.66%
Native American or Alaska Native alone (NH)	112	123	119	2.51%	2.63%	2.44%
Asian alone (NH)	61	152	220	1.37%	3.25%	4.51%
Native Hawaiian or Pacific Islander alone (NH)	3	16	21	0.07%	0.34%	0.43%
Other race alone (NH)	12	13	45	0.27%	0.28%	0.92%
Mixed race or Multiracial (NH)	178	174	379	3.99%	3.72%	7.76%
Hispanic or Latino (any race)	204	387	556	4.58%	8.28%	11.39%
Total	4,459	4,675	4,882	100.00%	100.00%	100.00%

=== 2020 census ===
As of the 2020 census, Myrtletown had a population of 4,882. The population density was 2,325.9 inhabitants per square mile (898.0/km^{2}). Of residents, 98.6% lived in urban areas and 1.4% lived in rural areas.

The census reported that 95.4% of the population lived in households, 3.0% lived in non-institutionalized group quarters, and 1.6% were institutionalized.

There were 2,006 households, of which 26.7% included children under the age of 18. Of all households, 37.7% were married-couple households, 10.5% were cohabiting couple households, 31.9% had a female householder with no spouse or partner present, and 19.9% had a male householder with no spouse or partner present. 33.2% of households were one person households, and 15.9% were one person aged 65 or older. The average household size was 2.32. There were 1,129 families (56.3% of all households).

The age distribution was 21.0% under the age of 18, 6.6% aged 18 to 24, 27.7% aged 25 to 44, 22.4% aged 45 to 64, and 22.3% who were 65 years of age or older. The median age was 40.5 years. For every 100 females, there were 89.5 males, and for every 100 females age 18 and over there were 87.3 males.

There were 2,156 housing units at an average density of 1,027.2 units per square mile (396.6 units/km^{2}), of which 2,006 (93.0%) were occupied and 7.0% were vacant. Of occupied units, 51.6% were owner-occupied and 48.4% were occupied by renters. The homeowner vacancy rate was 0.5%, and the rental vacancy rate was 4.0%.

=== Demographic estimates ===
In 2023, the US Census Bureau estimated that 9.2% of the population were foreign-born. Of all people aged 5 or older, 87.7% spoke only English at home, 7.0% spoke Spanish, 1.5% spoke other Indo-European languages, and 3.7% spoke Asian or Pacific Islander languages. Of those aged 25 or older, 88.4% were high school graduates and 40.0% had a bachelor's degree.

=== Income and poverty ===
The median household income in 2023 was $55,543, and the per capita income was $38,356. About 13.7% of families and 20.3% of the population were below the poverty line.

=== 2010 census ===
The 2010 United States census reported that Myrtletown had a population of 4,675. The population density was 2,143.3 inhabitants per square mile (827.5/km^{2}). The racial makeup of Myrtletown was 3,969 (84.9%) White, 53 (1.1%) African American, 142 (3.0%) Native American, 155 (3.3%) Asian, 19 (0.4%) Pacific Islander, 126 (2.7%) from other races, and 211 (4.5%) from two or more races. Hispanic or Latino of any race were 387 persons (8.3%).

The Census reported that 4,475 people (95.7% of the population) lived in households, 106 (2.3%) lived in non-institutionalized group quarters, and 94 (2.0%) were institutionalized.

There were 1,992 households, out of which 496 (24.9%) had children under the age of 18 living in them, 777 (39.0%) were opposite-sex married couples living together, 192 (9.6%) had a female householder with no husband present, 109 (5.5%) had a male householder with no wife present. There were 158 (7.9%) unmarried opposite-sex partnerships, and 24 (1.2%) same-sex married couples or partnerships. 713 households (35.8%) were made up of individuals, and 319 (16.0%) had someone living alone who was 65 years of age or older. The average household size was 2.25. There were 1,078 families (54.1% of all households); the average family size was 2.89.

The population was spread out, with 914 people (19.6%) under the age of 18, 414 people (8.9%) aged 18 to 24, 1,169 people (25.0%) aged 25 to 44, 1,205 people (25.8%) aged 45 to 64, and 973 people (20.8%) who were 65 years of age or older. The median age was 41.3 years. For every 100 females, there were 89.1 males. For every 100 females age 18 and over, there were 86.7 males.

There were 2,132 housing units at an average density of 977.4 per square mile (377.4/km^{2}), of which 1,992 were occupied, of which 1,032 (51.8%) were owner-occupied, and 960 (48.2%) were occupied by renters. The homeowner vacancy rate was 0.9%; the rental vacancy rate was 3.5%. 2,413 people (51.6% of the population) lived in owner-occupied housing units and 2,062 people (44.1%) lived in rental housing units.

== Architecture ==
Myrtletown is known for having a high concentration of homes built by the Pierson Building Company, a local builder of mass-produced homes, which were primarily produced in the 1950s and 1960s. These homes form a unique Pierson style characterized by low-pitched roofs, floor-to-ceiling picture windows, and open, central floor plans. The periphery areas of Myrtletown primarily contain houses built in the latter half of the 20th century. However, several houses exist from the 1930s and 40s, when the area was grassy and open.

== Politics ==
In the state legislature, Myrtletown is in the 2nd senatorial district, represented by Democrat Mike McGuire, and the 2nd Assembly district, represented by Democrat Chris Rogers.

Federally, Myrtletown is in California's 2nd congressional district, represented by Democrat Jared Huffman.
