= Sue-meg State Park =

State park in Humboldt County, California, United States

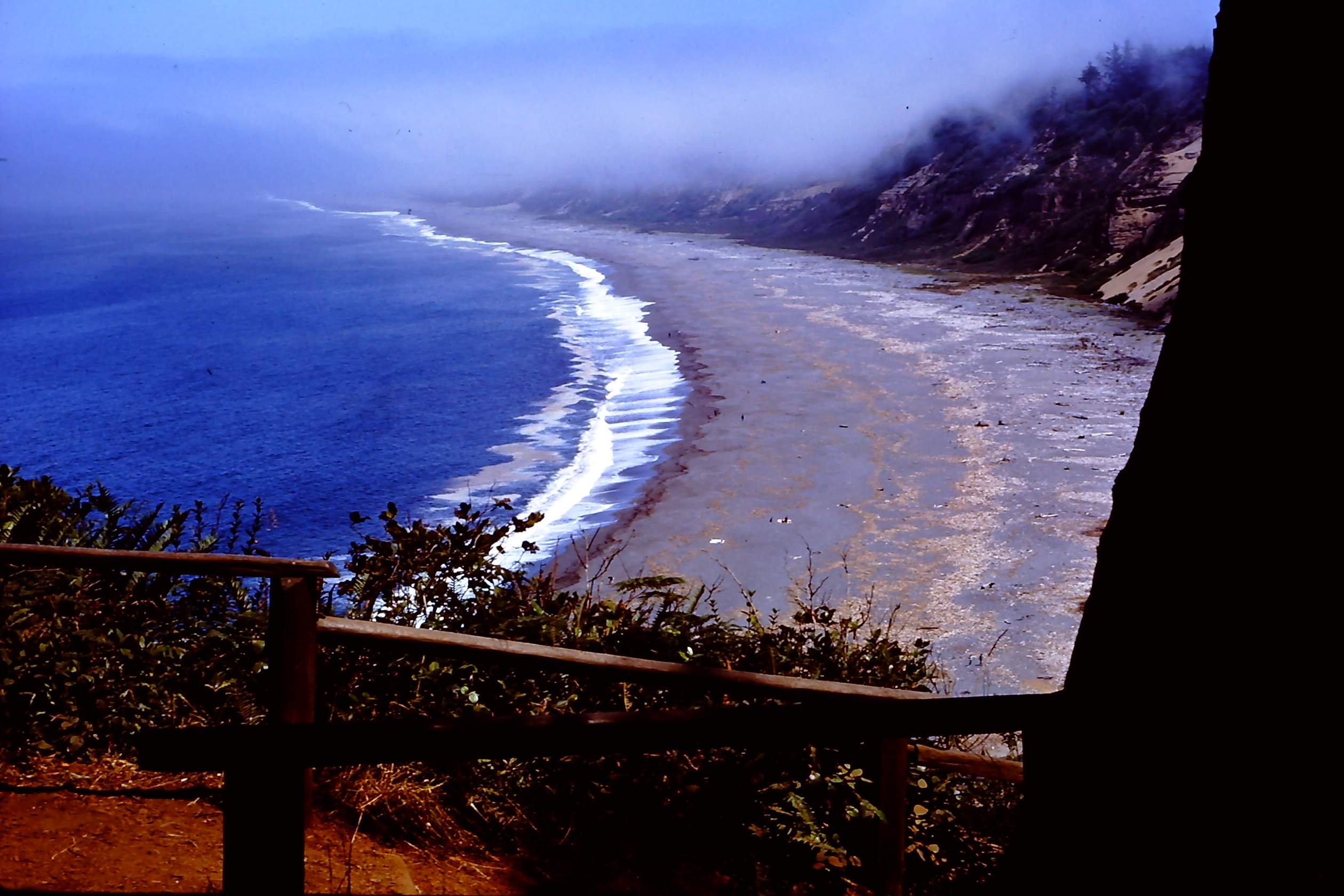
- Agate Beach at Sue-meg State Park

- Location within California Location within the United States
- Location: Humboldt County, California, United States
- Nearest city: Eureka, California
- Coordinates: 41°8′9″N 124°9′41″W
- Area: 640 acres (260 ha)
- Governing body: California Department of Parks and Recreation

Sue-meg State Park (formerly Patrick's Point State Park) is a 640-acre California State Park (260 ha) in Humboldt County, California near Trinidad on the Redwood Coast, situated on a lushly forested promontory above the Pacific Ocean.

The park is home to many tree species including coastal redwoods, Sitka spruce, western hemlock, pine, grand fir, Douglas fir, red alder and wildflower meadows, with a shoreline that consists of sandy beaches and sheer cliffs against the Pacific Ocean.

Amenities include hiking trails, a recreated Yurok Village, a native plant garden, visitor center, three family campgrounds, two group camps, a camp for hikers and bicyclists, accessible beaches, lookout points, and three group picnic areas.

== Sumêg Village ==
The reconstructed Yurok village, built in the 1990s, includes multiple traditional buildings, including a sweat house, changing houses, a redwood canoe, and a dance house; according to the California State Parks, "[it was] planned and built by the Yurok people working with local park staff," and includes amenities such as a parking area, a covered cook shelter, and picnic tables.

Historically the village site was known to The Yurok Tribe to have been used as a fishing camp.

=== Sumêg Village Restorations ===
A set of restorations were completed in 2003/2004, and according to the California State Parks the work included "replacing worn hazel lashings, deteriorated redwood planks, and general clean-up of vegetation encroaching on the buildings and surrounding stone work."

== Sumêg Native Plant Garden ==
The Native Plant Garden was established in 1974, by the then Patrick's Point Garden Club, and includes a native plant repository. The Native Garden is adjacent to a reconstructed Yurok Village, Sumêg Village and was restored in 1997 to explicitly include plants which would have been traditionally used by The Yurok tribe members.

=== Native Plant Garden Restorations ===
Efforts were made in early 2025 to restore the Native Plant Garden, by Native Women’s Collective, Rou Dalagurr Food Sovereignty Lab & TEK Institute, Cal Poly Humboldt Native American Studies Department, and Trinidad Rancheria, in partnership with California State Parks.

== History ==
Sue-meg is the original place name used by the Yurok people. In the modern Yurok orthography, it is spelled Suemeeg, pronounced [ʂumiɣ] or [ʂumij].

Patrick Beegan, an Irish immigrant who came from the Mississippi Valley in 1851, referred to the area as Patrick's Ranch. After encountering wild potato, "Old Patrick," as he was known to the residents of the Trinidad area, decided to stop and file a preemption claim to the land. Beegan's claim to the land was first recorded in the Trinidad Record Book on January 13, 1851, and the first official mention of Patrick's Point on the Humboldt County map was in 1886.

Another narrative attributes the name to Patrick McLaughlin, a squatter who arrived in the 1870s and is credited with planting the first apple trees in the area.

Efforts to protect the wooded region and coastal rock formations led to the establishment of the park, ultimately encompassing an area of 420.01 acres (169.97 ha), originally named Patrick's Point State Park.

The California State Park System acquired the Park in 1930.

=== Renaming ===
Requests from various parties, most notably The Yurok Tribe, were made that the park should be renamed, as it was asserted that Patrick Beegan had been accused of murdering several Indigenous Americans, this led to a name change. Sue-meg, reflecting the original Yurok name for the land, became official by unanimous vote of the California State Parks and Recreation Commission in 2021.

The California State Park and Recreation Commission stated that the renaming was an example of how "[the] California State Parks is reviewing contested place names, monuments and interpretation across the State Park System," which in turn is part of a broad effort by the California state government titled "Reexamining Our Past Initiative."

It has been documented that The Yurok Tribe has made efforts to change the name of the Park for over 100 years.

== See also ==
- List of beaches in California
- List of California state parks
- Parks in Humboldt County, California
