= Pine Hill, California =

Unincorporated community in California, United States

Pine Hill
- Unincorporated community
- Location in California Pine Hill (the United States)
- Coordinates: 40°45′52″N 124°10′28″W
- Country: United States
- State: California
- County: Humboldt
- Elevation: 135 ft (41 m)

Pine Hill (formerly, Tigerville, Pine's Hill, and East Sunnyside) is an unincorporated community in Humboldt County, California, United States. It is located 2.5 miles (4 km) south of downtown Eureka, at an elevation of 135 feet (41 m). The area is now part of unincorporated Eureka.

The name honors Safford E. Pine, local dairy farmer.
