= Cutten, California =

Cutten
- census-designated place
- Location in Humboldt County and the state of California
- Coordinates: 40°46′11″N 124°08′34″W
- Country: United States
- State: California
- County: Humboldt

Area
  - Total: 1.28 sq mi (3.32 km^{2})
  - Land: 1.28 sq mi (3.32 km^{2})
  - Water: 0 sq mi (0.00 km^{2}) 0%
- Elevation: 200 ft (61 m)

Population (2020)
  - Total: 3,223
  - Density: 2,515.6/sq mi (971.26/km^{2})
- Time zone: UTC-8 (Pacific (PST))
  - Summer (DST): UTC-7 (PDT)
- ZIP code: 95503, 95534
- Area code: 707
- FIPS code: 06-17722
- GNIS feature ID: 1655945

Cutten, a census-designated place (CDP) in Humboldt County, California, United States, is an unincorporated community, which is part of Greater Eureka. The community was named for David Page Cutten and his family, who were prominent figures in the history of Humboldt County during the early 1850s. Cutten is located 2.5 miles (4 km) south-southeast of downtown Eureka, at an elevation of 200 feet (61 m). Its population is 3,223 as of the 2020 census, up from 3,108 from the 2010 census.

== Geography ==
According to the United States Census Bureau, the CDP has a total area of 1.3 square miles (3.4 km^{2}), all land.

== History ==
The first post office at Cutten opened in 1929. An early name for the area was the Cutten-McDonald Tract. The ZIP Code is 95534. However, the 95534 zip code is specific to the post office only and all physical addresses within the CDP have the Eureka, California 95503 zip code.

== Demographics ==
Historical population
| Census | Pop. | Note | %± |
|---|---|---|---|
| 1960 | 1,572 | | — |
| 1970 | 2,228 | | 41.7% |
| 1980 | 2,375 | | 6.6% |
| 1990 | 1,516 | | −36.2% |
| 2000 | 2,933 | | 93.5% |
| 2010 | 3,108 | | 6.0% |
| 2020 | 3,223 | | 3.7% |
U.S. Decennial Census; 1860–1870 1880-1890; 1900 1910 1920; 1930 1940 1950; 1960 1970 1980; 1990 2000 2010; 2020

Cutten was part of the Bayview-Rosewood-Cutten unincorporated community in the 1950 U.S. census (pop. 1,923). It was listed alone in the 1960 U.S. census; and then as a census designated place in the 1980 U.S. census.

=== Racial and ethnic composition ===
Cutten CDP, California – Racial and ethnic composition Note: the US Census treats Hispanic/Latino as an ethnic category. This table excludes Latinos from the racial categories and assigns them to a separate category. Hispanics/Latinos may be of any race.
| Race / Ethnicity (NH = Non-Hispanic) | Pop 2000 | Pop 2010 | Pop 2020 | % 2000 | % 2010 | % 2020 |
|---|---|---|---|---|---|---|
| White alone (NH) | 2,506 | 2,506 | 2,301 | 85.44% | 80.63% | 71.39% |
| Black or African American alone (NH) | 21 | 26 | 32 | 0.72% | 0.84% | 0.99% |
| Native American or Alaska Native alone (NH) | 73 | 91 | 131 | 2.49% | 2.93% | 4.06% |
| Asian alone (NH) | 41 | 76 | 130 | 1.40% | 2.45% | 4.03% |
| Native Hawaiian or Pacific Islander alone (NH) | 11 | 11 | 20 | 0.38% | 0.35% | 0.62% |
| Other race alone (NH) | 1 | 10 | 23 | 0.03% | 0.32% | 0.71% |
| Mixed race or Multiracial (NH) | 104 | 134 | 221 | 3.55% | 4.31% | 6.86% |
| Hispanic or Latino (any race) | 176 | 254 | 365 | 6.00% | 8.17% | 11.32% |
| Total | 2,933 | 3,108 | 3,223 | 100.00% | 100.00% | 100.00% |

=== 2020 census ===
As of the 2020 census, Cutten had a population of 3,223 and a population density of 2,516.0 inhabitants per square mile (971.4/km^{2}).

The census reported that 98.3% of the population lived in households, 1.7% lived in non-institutionalized group quarters, and no one was institutionalized.

There were 1,298 households, out of which 28.4% included children under the age of 18, 44.5% were married-couple households, 10.3% were cohabiting couple households, 28.1% had a female householder with no partner present, and 17.1% had a male householder with no partner present. 27.7% of households were one person, and 13.3% were one person aged 65 or older. The average household size was 2.44. There were 818 families (63.0% of all households).

The age distribution was 21.1% under the age of 18, 8.0% aged 18 to 24, 28.0% aged 25 to 44, 22.2% aged 45 to 64, and 20.7% who were 65 years of age or older. The median age was 39.4 years. For every 100 females, there were 93.1 males, and for every 100 females age 18 and over, there were 89.2 males.

There were 1,361 housing units at an average density of 1,062.5 units per square mile (410.2 units/km^{2}), of which 1,298 (95.4%) were occupied and 63 (4.6%) were vacant. Of occupied housing units, 58.3% were owner-occupied and 41.7% were occupied by renters. The homeowner vacancy rate was 0.9%, and the rental vacancy rate was 4.2%.

=== Income and poverty ===
In 2023, the US Census Bureau estimated that the median household income was $93,500, and the per capita income was $43,431. About 4.2% of families and 6.5% of the population were below the poverty line.

=== 2010 census ===
The 2010 United States census reported that Cutten had a population of 3,108. The population density was 2,401.8 inhabitants per square mile (927.3/km^{2}). The racial makeup of Cutten was 2,628 (84.6%) White, 27 (0.9%) African American, 119 (3.8%) Native American, 80 (2.6%) Asian, 11 (0.4%) Pacific Islander, 78 (2.5%) from other races, and 165 (5.3%) from two or more races. Hispanic or Latino of any race were 254 persons (8.2%).

The Census reported that 3,092 people (99.5% of the population) lived in households, 11 (0.4%) lived in non-institutionalized group quarters, and 5 (0.2%) were institutionalized.

There were 1,304 households, out of which 407 (31.2%) had children under the age of 18 living in them, 574 (44.0%) were opposite-sex married couples living together, 141 (10.8%) had a female householder with no husband present, 80 (6.1%) had a male householder with no wife present. There were 94 (7.2%) unmarried opposite-sex partnerships, and 14 (1.1%) same-sex married couples or partnerships. 390 households (29.9%) were made up of individuals, and 153 (11.7%) had someone living alone who was 65 years of age or older. The average household size was 2.37. There were 795 families (61.0% of all households); the average family size was 2.95.

The population age distribution is 718 people (23.1%) under the age of 18, 287 people (9.2%) aged 18 to 24, 798 people (25.7%) aged 25 to 44, 823 people (26.5%) aged 45 to 64, and 482 people (15.5%) who were 65 years of age or older. The median age was 37.9 years. For every 100 females, there were 96.2 males. For every 100 females age 18 and over, there were 92.3 males.

There were 1,372 housing units at an average density of 1,060.3 per square mile (409.4/km^{2}), of which 1,304 were occupied, of which 713 (54.7%) were owner-occupied, and 591 (45.3%) were occupied by renters. The homeowner vacancy rate was 2.3%; the rental vacancy rate was 3.4%. 1,762 people (56.7% of the population) lived in owner-occupied housing units and 1,330 people (42.8%) lived in rental housing units.

== Politics ==
In the state legislature, Cutten is in the 2nd senatorial district, represented by Democrat Mike McGuire, and the 2nd Assembly district, represented by Democrat Chris Rogers.

Federally, Cutten is in California's 2nd congressional district, represented by Democrat Jared Huffman.
