= List of South Fork Eel River crossings =

The South Fork Eel River, a river in the northern part of the U.S. state of California, rises near Laytonville and flows about 105 miles (169 km) in a northerly direction to its confluence with the Eel River near Weott. Some major tributaries of the mostly free-flowing river include Tenmile Creek, the East Branch South Fork Eel River near Benbow, and Hollow Tree Creek. The river drains 689 square miles (1,780 km^{2}) and is said to be the primary river supporting coho salmon in the state.

This list of crossings of the river proceeds from mouth to its headwaters. Thirty-five bridges are listed, including on the South Fork and on a large tributary, Tenmile Creek. (The East Branch South Fork Eel River, though larger, is by far less developed than Tenmile, so it is not listed.)

== Mainstream ==
Road or railway	Description	Coordinates
SR 254 (1)	Also called "Avenue of the Giants". The road crosses just upstream of the Eel River confluence, inside Humboldt Redwoods State Park.	40°21′16″N 123°55′32″W
US 101 (1)	Also "Redwood Highway", Highway 101 crosses just upstream of SR 211 and then parallels the river for much of its length.	40°21′15″N 123°55′35″W
US 101 (2)	Crosses just east of the town of Myers Flat, just upstream of the Kerr Creek confluence.	40°15′59″N 123°52′01″W
Maple Hills Road	Crosses on a concrete beam bridge south (upstream) of Miranda, connecting Highway 101 with SR 254 (which are now on opposite sides of the river).	40°13′05″N 123°49′00″W
US 101 (3)	Crosses about 1-mile (1.6 km) south (upstream) of Phillipsville, also crossing over SR 254.	40°10′56″N 123°46′33″W
Wood Ranch Road	Branches west off Redwood Drive and crosses the river about 1-mile (1.6 km) downstream of Redway.	40°08′22″N 123°48′52″W
Briceland Thorn Road	Leads west from the town of Redway along Redwood Creek, a tributary of the South Fork Eel River.	40°07′20″N 123°50′11″W
Bear Canyon Road	Crosses the South Fork on a three-span beam bridge 1.5 miles (2.4 km) upstream from Redway, very near the mouth of Bear Canyon Creek (hence the name).	40°06′25″N 123°47′52″W
Sproul Creek Road	About 0.5-mile (0.80 km) south (upstream) of Garberville the road connects the east bank with the west bank which has the Garberville Airport.	40°05′26″N 123°47′56″W
Twin Trees Road	Crosses via a ford 2 miles (3.2 km) upstream of Garberville, near a meander in the South Fork Eel River.	40°03′38″N 123°49′25″W
US 101 (4)	Crosses former Benbow Lake (a reservoir on the South Fork), inside the Benbow State Recreation Area, directly south of the town of Benbow and near the confluence with the East Branch South Fork Eel River.	40°03′45″N 123°47′01″W
Benbow Drive	Crosses the river about 1.3 miles (2.1 km) south of Benbow and just north of Richardson Grove State Park.	40°02′02″N 123°46′36″W
US 101 (5)	Crosses nearly directly atop the Benbow Drive bridge, just a little bit upstream from it.	40°02′02″N 123°46′34″W
Access Road	The access road for Richardson Grove State Park crosses the river on a single-land bridge, upstream from the confluence with Durphy Creek.	40°01′05″N 123°47′25″W
Unnamed Road	Access road, likely to a gravel mining operation. Crosses the South Fork 2 miles (3.2 km) downstream of Andersonia and just upstream of Richardson Grove State Park, on the west side of a sharp southward meander.	40°00′25″N 123°46′48″W
Unnamed Road	Road crossing the river on the east side of that meander, leading to the ridge between Rancheria and Low Gap creeks.	40°00′15″N 123°46′40″W
US 101 (6)	Crosses just downstream of the previously described meander.	39°59′59″N 123°47′08″W
SR 271 (1)	Crosses on a truss bridge directly upstream of the Highway 101 crossing.	40°00′03″N 123°47′15″W
Dimmick Road	Crosses via a ford just north of Andersonia, near the Indian Creek confluence.	39°58′38″N 123°48′16″W
Confusion Hill Bridges	This is a set of two bridges that reroutes Highway 101 away from a landslide area on the east bank of the river.	39°55′15″N 123°45′48″W 39°55′38″N 123°45′38″W / 39.92722°N 123.76056°W / 39.92722; -123.76056[1]
US 101 (7)	Crosses a few hundred yards downstream of the McCoy Creek confluence, shortly west-southwest of the city of Piercy.	39°57′31″N 123°46′54″W
US 101 (8)	Crosses just above the McCoy Creek confluence, just south of the previously described crossing.	39°57′25″N 123°46′50″W
Access Road	The access road for Standish Hickey State Recreation Area crosses the river just downstream of the Rock Creek confluence. It crosses the river on a low-water bridge that may be inundated during floods.	39°52′31″N 123°43′33″W
SR 1	California State Route 1 (Shoreline Highway) drops into the South Fork Eel River canyon, crossing the river on a single-span truss bridge.	39°51′50″N 123°43′21″W
Branscomb Road	Crosses the South Fork just above the confluence of another Redwood Creek and below the confluence of a Rock Creek.	39°40′52″N 123°39′00″W

=== Tenmile Creek ===
Tenmile Creek begins east of Laytonville and flows west then north along Highway 101, then turns to the west, cutting through a narrow rocky gorge before emptying into the South Fork Eel River about 9 miles (14 km) downstream of Branscomb. The creek is about 21 miles (34 km) long, although its name suggests otherwise.

Road or railway	Description	Coordinates
Unnamed Road	The creek is crossed by an unnamed road near the outlet of Steep Gulch, about 5 miles (8.0 km) north-northwest of Laytonville. The road crosses the creek on a one-lane bridge.	39°45′36″N 123°32′31″W
Valley Drive (1)	Crosses about 0.75-mile (1.21 km) above previous described bridge.	39°44′57″N 123°31′59″W
Valley Drive (2)	Valley Drive crosses Tenmile Creek for the second time, about 1-mile (1.6 km) upstream from its first crossing. This is just upstream from the Stapp Creek confluence and about 3.5 miles (5.6 km) north of Laytonville.	39°43′44″N 123°30′37″W
Tenmile Creek Road (1)	This bridge is situated between two low ridges about 2 miles (3.2 km) north of Laytonville.	39°42′57″N 123°30′21″W
Tenmile Creek Road (2)	The road crosses again about 0.4 miles (0.64 km) upstream of the first crossing.	39°42′22″N 123°30′16″W
Branscomb Road	About 0.6 miles (0.97 km) north of Laytonville and a few hundred yards upstream of the confluence with Little Case Creek.	39°41′16″N 123°29′32″W
Unnamed Road	The creek is crossed by the bridge of an access road to private property, just east-southeast of Laytonville.	39°40′27″N 123°29′02″W
Unnamed Road	Just upstream of the previous crossing the creek is crossed again by an access road to private property, just east of U.S. Highway 101.	39°40′20″N 123°28′59″W
Steele Lane	About 2 miles (3.2 km) south-southeast of Laytonville, and 0.2 miles (0.32 km) west of Highway 101, at the confluence of Tenmile Creek and an unnamed tributary.	39°39′05″N 123°29′00″W
US 101	Just upstream of the Steele Lane bridge, downstream of the spot where Tenmile Creek turns northwards from its southwest-heading journey from its headwaters.	39°38′49″N 123°28′34″W
Davidson Road	The creek is crossed by the bridge of an access road to private property.	39°39′04″N 123°28′03″W

== General references ==
- National Bridge Inventory
