= Cahto (disambiguation) =

The Cahto are a Native American people of northern California.

Cahto may also refer to:

- Cahto language, the language historically spoken by the Cahto people
- Cahto, California, a former settlement in Mendocino County, California
