= Kato language =

Extinct Athabaskan language of California

Kato
- Cahto
- Native to: United States
- Region: California (Eel River)
- Ethnicity: Cahto people
- Extinct: 1960s
- Revival: 2010s
- Language family: Na-Dené: Athabaskan; Pacific Coast Athabaskan; California Athabaskan; Kato
- Writing system: Latin (proposed)

Language codes
- ISO 639-3: ktw
- Glottolog: kato1244

Cahto (also spelled Kato) is an extinct Athabaskan language that was formerly spoken by the Kato people of the Laytonville and Branscomb area at the head of the South Fork of the Eel River. It is one of the four languages belonging to the California Athabaskan cluster of the Pacific Coast Athabaskan languages. Most Kato speakers were bilingual in Northern Pomo and some also spoke Yuki. It went extinct in the 1960s.

== Phonology ==
=== Consonants ===
		Labial	Dental	Alveolar		Post- alveolar	Palatal	Velar		Uvular	Glottal
		Labial	Dental	central	lateral	Post- alveolar	Palatal	plain	labial	Uvular	Glottal
Nasal		m ⟨m⟩		n ⟨n⟩			ɲ ⟨ñ⟩				
Plosive/ Affricate	unaspirated	p~b ⟨b⟩	t~d ⟨d⟩	ts ⟨ts⟩		t͡ʃ~d͡ʒ ⟨dj⟩	c~ɟ ⟨g⟩	k~g ⟨g⟩	kʷ ⟨kw⟩	k~q ⟨q⟩	ʔ ⟨′⟩
Plosive/ Affricate	ejective		tʼ ⟨tʼ⟩	tsʼ ⟨tsʼ⟩	tɬʼ ⟨L⟩	t͡ʃʼ ⟨tcʼ⟩	cʼ ⟨kʼ⟩	kʼ ⟨kʼ⟩	kʷʼ ⟨kwʼ⟩		
Plosive/ Affricate	aspirated		tʰ ⟨t⟩			t͡ʃʰ ⟨tc⟩	cʰ ⟨k⟩	kʰ ⟨k⟩			
Fricative	voiceless			s ⟨s⟩	ɬ ⟨ʟ⟩	ʃ ⟨c⟩					h ⟨h⟩
Fricative	voiced			z ⟨z⟩		ʒ		ɣ ⟨ɢ⟩			
Approximant				l ⟨l⟩			j ⟨y⟩		w ⟨w⟩		

Cahto has 26 consonant phonemes and 30 phones.

=== Vowels ===
	Front	Central	Back	Diphthong
High	[i(ː)] ī	[ɪ] i ~ [ʊ] û	[u(ː)] ū	[ai] ai
High-Mid	[e(ː)] ē	[e] ɛ ~ [ə] ę	[o(ː)] ō	[ai] ai
Low-Mid	[ɛ] ɛ ~ [ə] ę		[ʌ] ą ~ [a] a	[ai] ai
Low	[a(ː)] ā, [ʌ] ą ~ [a] a			[ai] ai

Cahto has 9 vowel phonemes (including the diphthong) and 12 phones.
