= South Fork Eel River =

River in north-central California

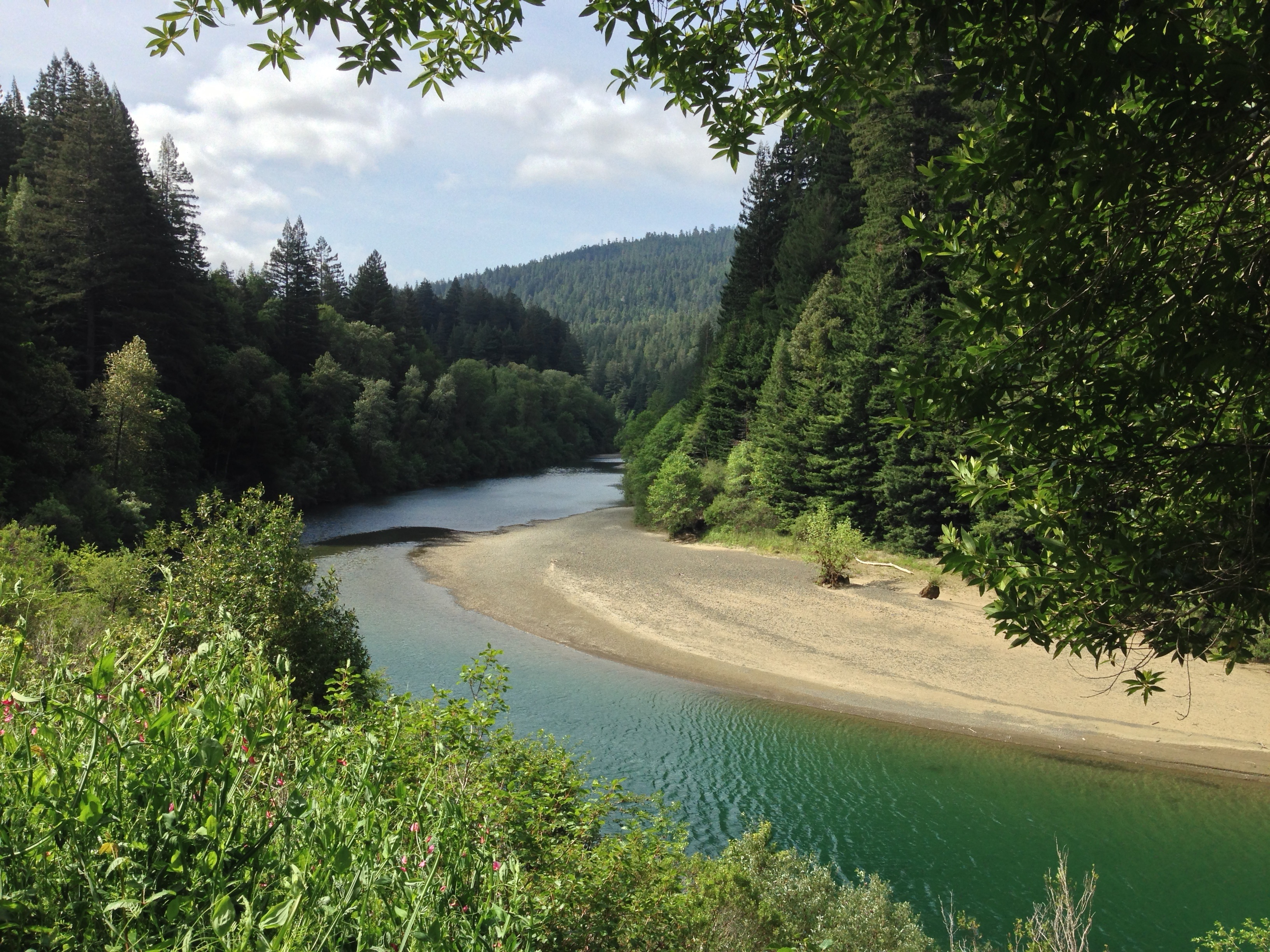
- Meander in the South Fork Eel River

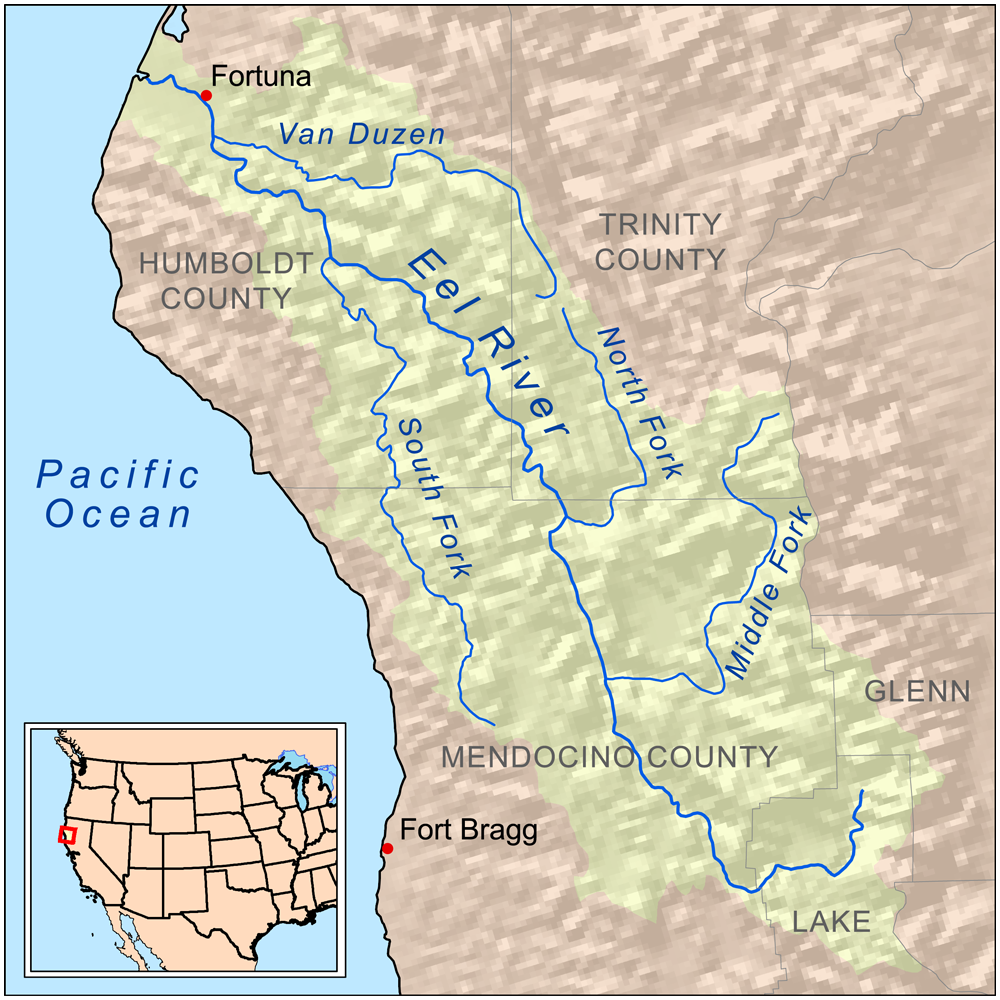
- Map of the Eel River drainage basin showing the South Fork

Location
- Country: United States
- State: California

Physical characteristics
- Source
  - location: Branscomb, California
  - coordinates: 39°36′46″N 123°29′34″W
  - elevation: 2,500 ft (760 m)
- Mouth: Eel River
  - location: Dyerville/Founders' Grove, California
  - coordinates: 40°21′21″N 123°55′10″W
  - elevation: 100 ft (30 m)
- Length: 105 mi (169 km)
- Basin size: 689 sq mi (1,780 km^{2})
- Discharge
  - location: USGS gage 11476500, near Miranda, CA, river mile 20
  - average: 1,845 cu ft/s (52.2 m^{3}/s)
  - minimum: 10 cu ft/s (0.28 m^{3}/s)
  - maximum: 199,000 cu ft/s (5,600 m^{3}/s)

Basin features
- Tributaries
  - left: Hollow Tree Creek, Bull Creek (California)
  - right: Tenmile Creek (South Fork Eel River), Rattlesnake Creek (California), Cedar Creek (South Fork Eel River), East Branch South Fork Eel River

National Wild and Scenic River
- Designated: January 19, 1981

The South Fork Eel River is the largest tributary of the Eel River in north-central California in the United States. The river flows 105 miles (169 km) north from Laytonville to Dyerville/Founders' Grove where it joins the Eel River. The South Fork drains a long and narrow portion of the Coast Range of California in parts of Mendocino and Humboldt counties. U.S. Route 101 follows the river for much of its length.

The Kai Pomo, a branch of the Pomo people, once lived in the upper portion of the watershed. Before industrial development in the 1800s, many native tribes relied on the river's abundant runs of salmon and steelhead. In the 1920s, a private company built the Benbow Dam, blocking fish migration to a large area of the basin.

The South Fork is designated as a National Wild and Scenic River from the confluence of Section Four Creek to the mouth.

== Course ==
The South Fork Eel River begins near Iron Mountain in western Mendocino County, at an elevation of 2,500 feet (760 m). Its headwaters are near that of the Ten Mile River to the south. Dropping off the high plateau where it begins, the South Fork winds north and bends southwest through a steep and narrow canyon. Longvale, California is a few miles to the east of the headwaters, while Laytonville, California is closer, only about 1-mile (1.6 km) to the north. It is not long after its headwaters that Branscomb Road drops into the South Fork Eel's canyon from the north, paralleling the river. Almost 1-mile (1.6 km) past this point, it receives its first significant tributary, Section Four Creek, on the left bank. Although it is not a large creek, only about 2.5 miles (4.0 km) long, it denotes the start of the National Wild and Scenic River section of the South Fork. The river meanders swiftly west and turns west-northwest, passing Branscomb, California. Near the city, it receives Rock Creek on the right and Redwood Creek on the left. These two stream names are a common occurrence throughout the South Fork's watershed. Afterwards, it receives its first significant tributary, Tenmile Creek, on the right bank. Tenmile Creek begins in another section of the Coast Range, separated from the South Fork Eel River by two sub-ranges. The creek begins in the easternmost of these two sub-ranges. It then flows west, cutting a water gap through the western subrange, and spills into the South Fork. The creek is about 21 miles (34 km) long, despite the name.

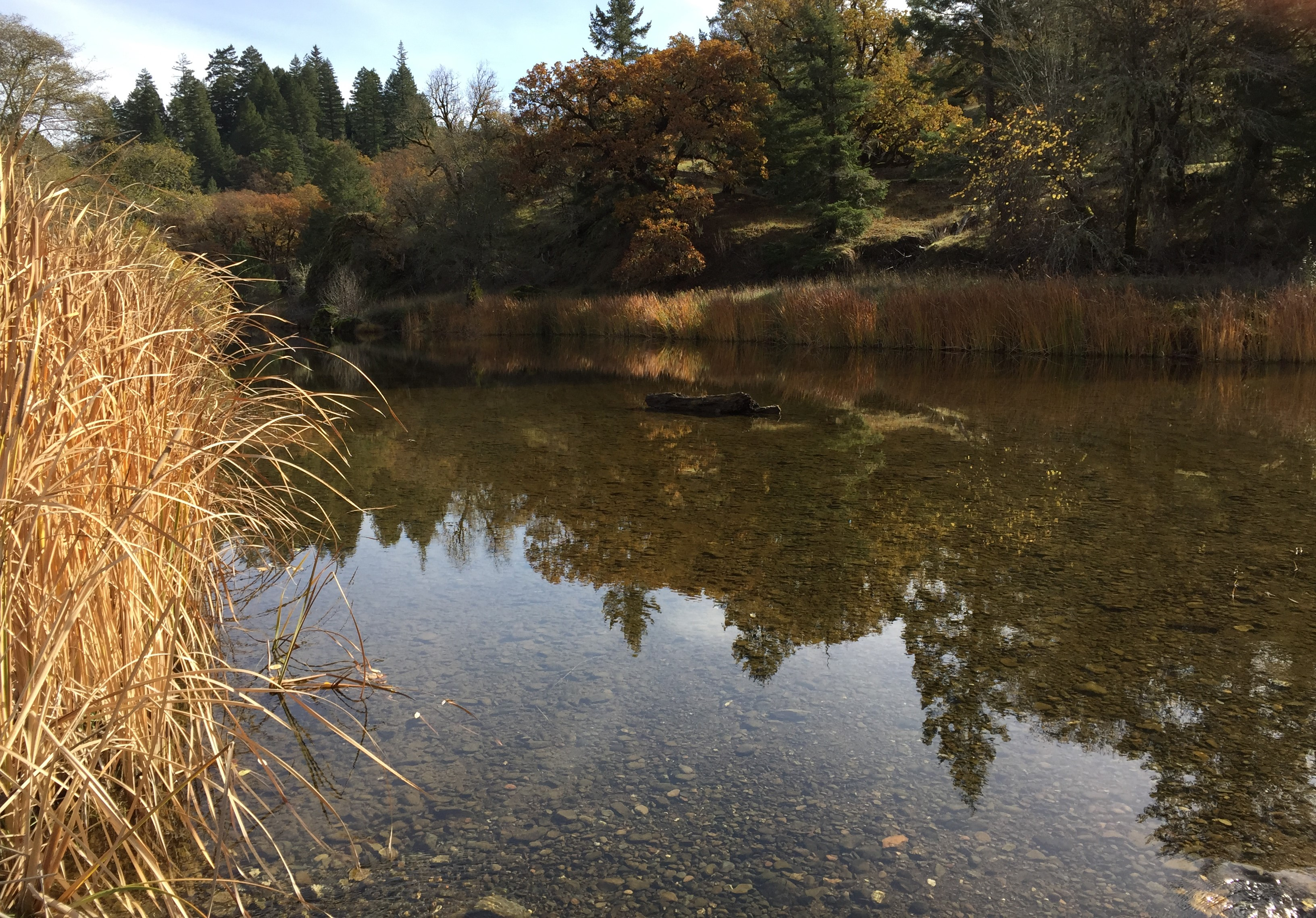
Ten Mile Creek a tributary to the South Fork of the Eel River, south of Bowman Place, California.

After the confluence with Tenmile Creek, the South Fork flows generally north, turning west where it receives another major tributary, 11-mile (18 km) Rattlesnake Creek, also on the right. This point is significant because it is where it begins to parallel U.S. Highway 101 and California State Route 271 (Redwood Highway and Old Redwood Highway). Both roads come in from the east and at this point are on the river's right bank. The river turns northwest, receiving Big Dann Creek and another large 9-mile (14 km) tributary, Cedar Creek, on the right bank. Cedar Creek flows west and turns south-southwest, flowing also in a steep, undeveloped gorge. Shortly past Cedar Creek, the South Fork Eel meets another large tributary, Hollow Tree Creek. Hollow Tree Creek flows east, turns north, then turns east again to meet the South Fork, fed by several smaller creeks. The South Fork then turns west again, flowing through the Standish Hickey State Recreational Area. It then meanders north into Richardson Grove State Park on an increasingly wide valley floor, receiving Red Mountain Creek on the right bank.

The river then reaches Benbow Lake, which is inside the Benbow State Recreation Area and next to the town of Benbow, California. Benbow Lake was a seasonal reservoir, formed by a dam at its western end. The dam was only raised in the summer, and only when water flow is sufficient for impoundment. Since about 2009, the lake no longer gets built, which is good for the ecology of the river. At Benbow Lake the South Fork meets its largest tributary, the East Branch South Fork Eel River. The East Branch, formed by the confluence of two small creeks, Cruso Cabin and Elkhorn Creeks, south of Bell Springs Mountain, flows through a rugged, narrow gorge in a generally northwest direction for about 20 miles (32 km). After passing through the Benbow Dam, which is non-functional during the winter months, the South Fork Eel receives another tributary called Redwood Creek on the left bank, as it bends north and then west around the community of Redway, California, which is located on a plateau east of the river. The river then passes through another rugged canyon, flowing northeast, then passes the towns of Phillipsville and Miranda which are to the east of the river. West of Miranda, the river receives another medium-sized tributary, Salmon Creek, from the left bank.

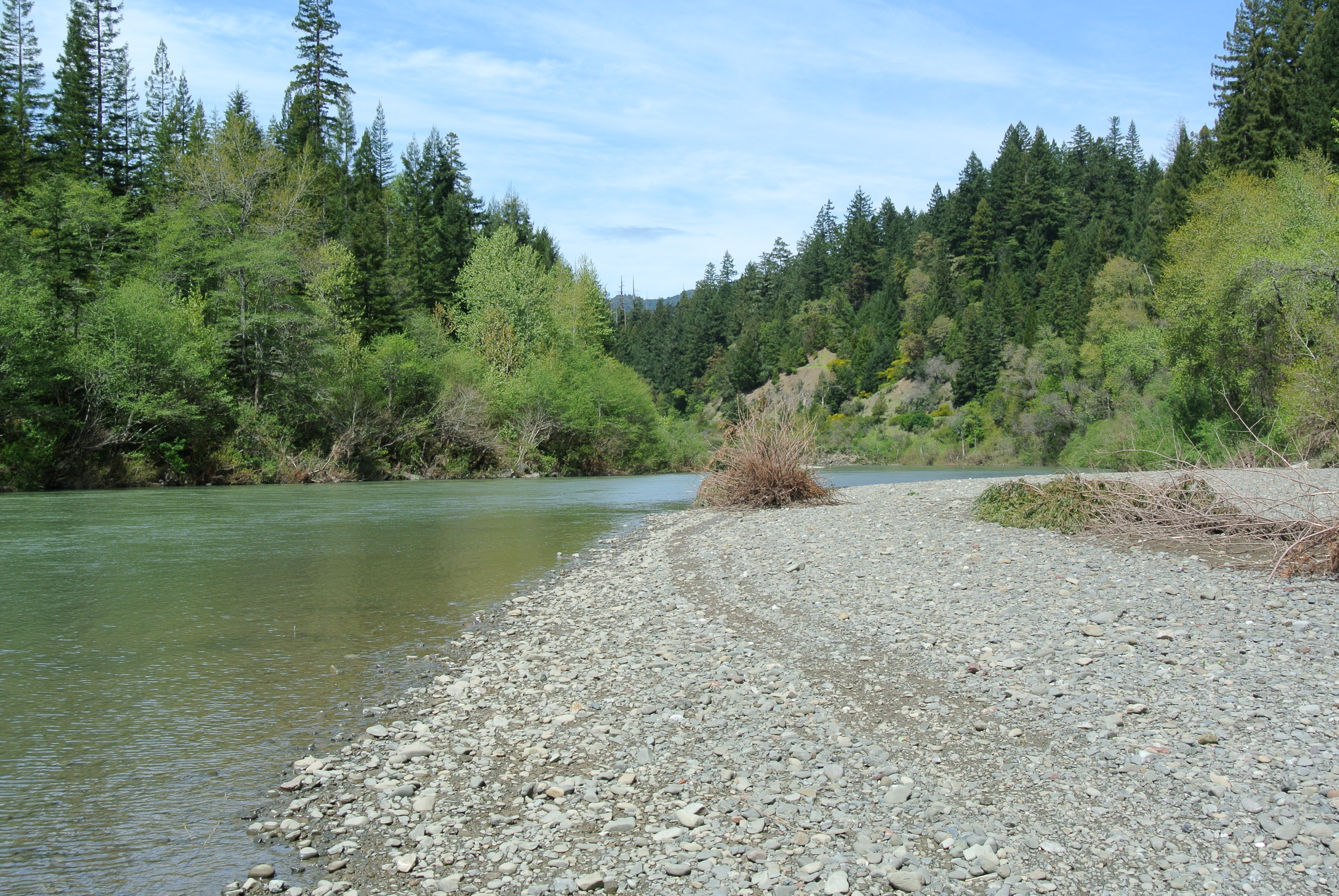
South Fork Eel River near the Avenue of the Giants in the Humboldt Redwoods State Park

The South Fork then flows north to a point where it turns sharply around a ridge and flows due south, then turns back north again. At this point, it is paralleled by Highway 101 on the left bank and by California State Route 254 (Avenue of the Giants) on the right bank. U.S. 101 then crosses the South Fork, paralleling CA-254. The village of Myers Flat is located on a low slice of terrain north of the river. The South Fork, nearing its mouth, passes Burlington on the right bank, and Weott, California, also on the right bank. Several hundred yards upstream from its confluence, it receives its last major tributary, Bull Creek, on the left bank. Bull Creek, whose watershed is entirely contained inside Humboldt Redwoods State Park, begins south of Grasshopper Mountain and flows northwest, then makes a great bend to the west and joins the South Fork. Its length is roughly 8 miles (13 km). After receiving Bull Creek, the South Fork Eel curves halfway around 325-foot (99 m) high Duckett Bluff, and receives its last named tributary, Cabin Creek, on the left bank. Meandering through a downcut channel between U.S. 101 and SR 254 (right bank) and California State Route 211, it then crosses under the former two highways, spreads wider, and flows into the Eel River.

== Watershed ==
The South Fork Eel River drains a long, narrow and mountainous watershed of 689 square miles (1,780 km^{2})–or almost 20 percent of the 3,684-square-mile (9,540 km^{2}) Eel River drainage basin. The watershed includes parts of Humboldt and Mendocino Counties and runs generally parallel to the Pacific Coast, with its north–south extent marked by Weott and Laytonville, California (about 144 miles (232 km) and 193 miles (311 km) north of San Francisco, respectively. The highest point in the watershed is Iron Peak, at 4,491 feet (1,369 m), and the mouth of the river is at roughly 100 feet (30 m).

Due to its rugged and remote location, the watershed is thinly populated. Although U.S. Highway 101 and California State Route 271 follow the river for over 70 percent of its length, there are few communities in the steep and narrow, forested canyon of the South Fork. Towns along the river include Branscomb, Underwood Park, Leggett, Piercy, Andersonia, Benbow, Garberville, Redway, Phillipsville, Miranda, Myers Flat, and Weott. The South Fork also has a number of protected areas along its course. These include Admiral Standley State Park, Standish Hickey State Recreation Area, Smithe Redwoods State Reserve, Richardson Grove State Park, South Fork Eel River Wilderness, Benbow State Recreation Area, and Humboldt Redwoods State Park. The river is used for recreation and provides groundwater recharge and industrial, agricultural and municipal water supply for residents.

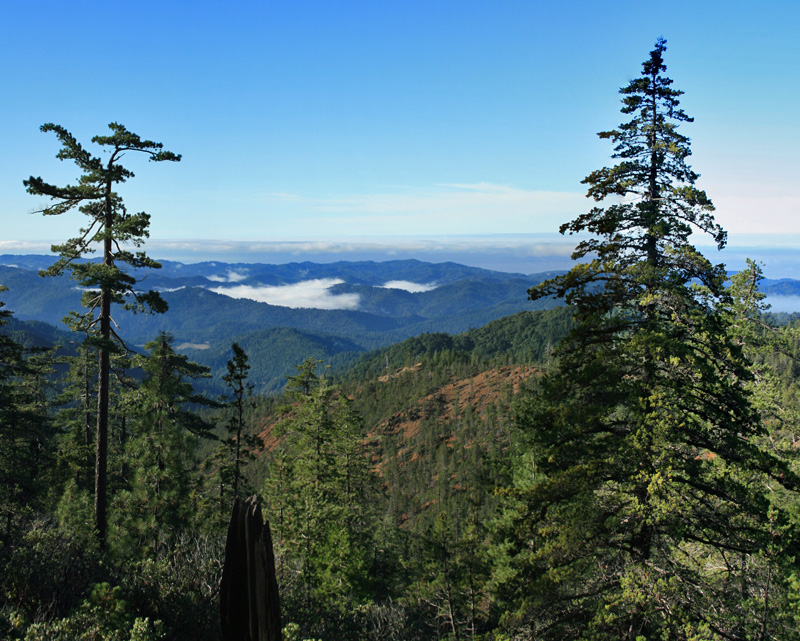
South Fork valley seen from Red Mountain above Cedar Creek

The largest tributary of the South Fork is the East Branch South Fork Eel River, which is approximately 25 miles (40 km) long. Tenmile Creek, at 21 miles (34 km) long, is the second largest tributary. Other major tributaries include Cedar Creek, at 7 mi (11 km) long; Bull Creek at 14 mi (23 km) long; and Hollow Tree Creek at 15 mi (24 km) long. There are many streams with repeating names in the watershed, including Low Gap Creek, Redwood Creek, Rock Creek, and Red Mountain Creek.

Historic logging activity in the South Fork watershed has stripped steep hillsides bare of vegetation, resulting in chronic erosion problems. Historically, South Fork Eel River water had an unusual translucent blue-green hue for most of the year. Increased turbidity levels caused by erosion has transformed the river into a generally brownish or tannish color. The South Fork is an important Northern California habitat for anadromous fish (see section below) and sediment has severely degraded conditions for these fish as well as other aquatic life forms.

The rugged topography of the South Fork Eel River watershed also produces an amount of waterfalls from tributary streams. Although there are no large waterfalls on the South Fork or its major tributaries, there are many on smaller side streams, especially after heavy rainfall. One of the highest waterfalls is Grizzly Creek Falls, which spills over a rocky cliff for nearly 1,000 feet (300 m) above the Tenmile Creek valley. The steep terrain also causes the river to fall at steep inclines, creating a series of rapids. The river's rapids are well known for rafting.

=== Discharge ===
On average, the river's discharge in its middle section can range from 2,000 cu ft/s (57 m^{3}/s) to 55 cu ft/s (1.6 m^{3}/s). In the lower section near the mouth, the river generally ranges from 5,500 cu ft/s (160 m^{3}/s) to 60 cu ft/s (1.7 m^{3}/s). The United States Geological Survey operates or operated four stream gauges on the South Fork, at Miranda, Garberville, Leggett, and Branscomb. For Miranda, the location closest to the mouth, the annual mean was 1,833 cubic feet per second (51.9 m^{3}/s) between 1940 and 2012; The highest recorded peak was 199,000 cubic feet per second (5,600 m^{3}/s) on 22 December 1964, with a minimum of 10 cubic feet per second (0.28 m^{3}/s) on 30 August 1964.

For Garberville, a stream gauge was only operated from 1912 to 1913, and again in 1940. The annual mean recorded here was 1,747 cubic feet per second (49.5 m^{3}/s). Peak discharges of 64,700 cubic feet per second (1,830 m^{3}/s) were recorded in both 1912 and 1913, while for 1940, the peak was 55,600 cubic feet per second (1,570 m^{3}/s).

The Leggett stream gauge began operating in 1965 and is still in use. An average discharge of 774 cubic feet per second (21.9 m^{3}/s) was recorded here from 1966 to 2010. The highest flow recorded was 72,700 cubic feet per second (2,060 m^{3}/s) on 4 January 1966. A higher peak flow of 78,700 cubic feet per second (2,230 m^{3}/s), on 22 December 1964, before the stream gauge was in place, was determined using flood stage height data and floodmark measurements. The minimum discharge recorded by this gauge was 7.3 cubic feet per second (0.21 m^{3}/s) on 4 August 1977.

For Branscomb, the location furthest upstream, the annual mean was 173 cubic feet per second (4.9 m^{3}/s) between 1946 and 1970. The highest flow recorded was 20,100 cubic feet per second (570 m^{3}/s) on 22 December 1955, while the lowest was 0.86 cubic feet per second (0.024 m^{3}/s) on 27 July 1977.

== Geology ==
The watershed is underlain by the Franciscan Assemblage, which consists of soft soil and rock in this region. The formation is created by the San Andreas Fault, and comprises most of California's Coast Range. The steep terrain in the South Fork Eel's watershed is the result of continuous uplift along the San Andreas Fault, and coinciding with the erosion caused by the river and its tributaries, steep canyons and ridges, many with slopes of over 50 percent, were formed. Of note is that the downstream reach of the river "may be uplifting as much as ten times faster than the headwaters area". In much of the middle and lower course of the South Fork Eel, the riverbed is mostly bare gravel, with sparse vegetation, and without a floodplain. The riverbed lies in a downcut channel, with its walls formed by bedrock with scattering of rocks. Bedrock river terraces surround the river, forming the "only level land in an otherwise rugged terrain of narrow ridges and steep [v]alleys".

== History ==
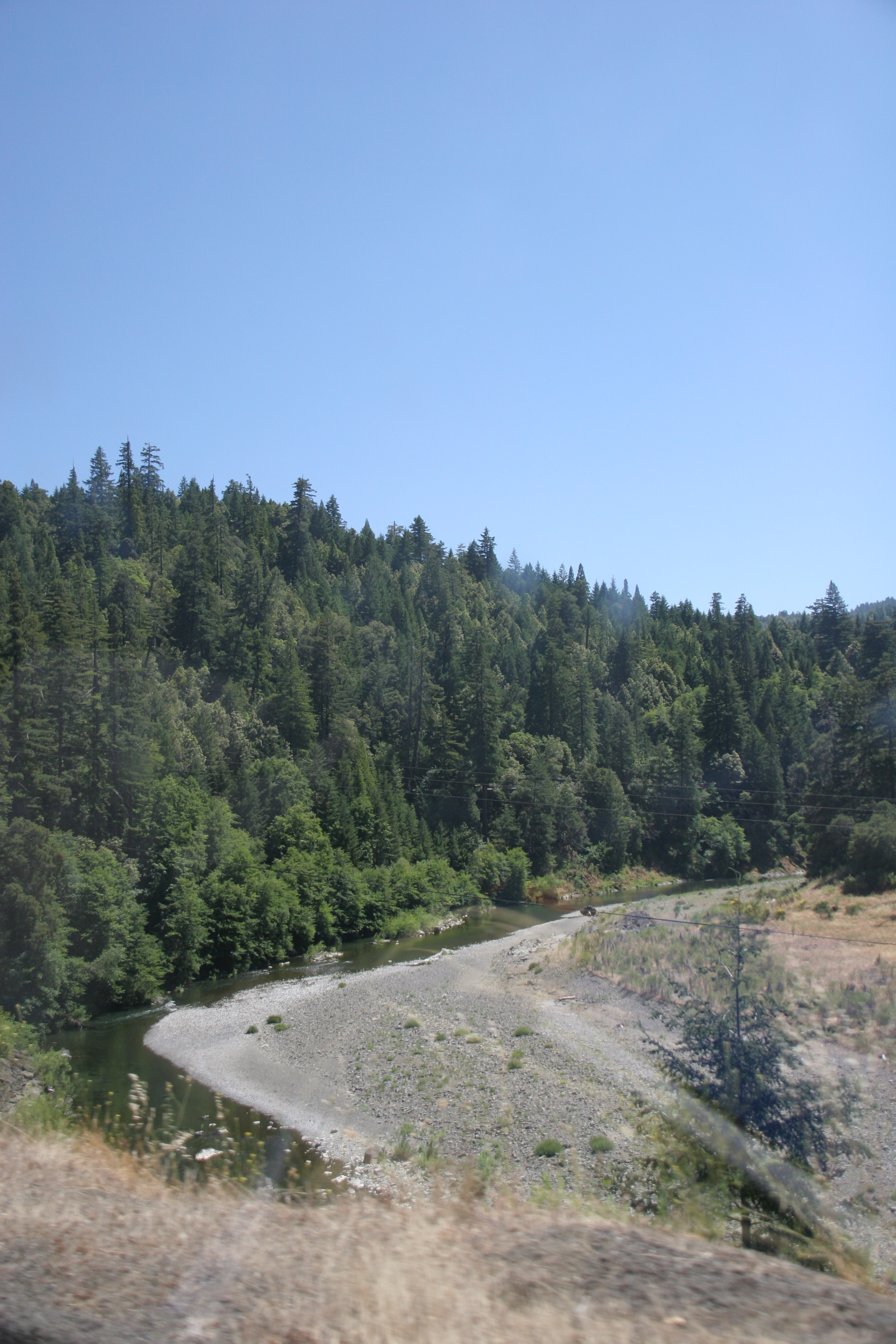
The South Fork Eel River appears dark in deeper areas, while it is a light blue in shallows.

Prior to white settlement of Central California, much of the Eel River watershed was inhabited by Pomo Indians and Athapascan peoples. The "extreme headwaters" of the South Fork of the Eel River, as well as the East Fork of the South Fork of the Eel River, were inhabited by the Kai Pomo, whose territory stretched westward to the Eel River mainstem and west and north to the boundary with the Athapascan. The lower section of the South Fork Eel was also said to be a boundary between tribes, although this claim is only "probable".

In 1928, the Benbow Dam was built across the South Fork near Benbow, California, which led to the creation of a slackwater pool, Benbow Lake, and the creation of the Benbow State Recreation Area. During the rainy season, the floodgates of the dam were removed. The lake existed during the summer, when lower flows are impounded behind the structure for recreation. The stagnant water in the lake was heated by the sun to a higher temperature than normal and severely hurt salmon and steelhead runs, as well as other aquatic and migratory life downstream. Since 2009 the dam was no longer erected. Benbow Dam was finally removed from 2016 to 2017 on the South Fork of the Eel River. Dam decommissioning will start to occur on the Klamath River in 2022 pending Federal Energy Regulatory Committee (FERC) approval.

The 12,915-acre (52.27 km^{2}) South Fork Eel River Wilderness was designated in 2006, stretching along portions of the South Fork Eel and extending westward to the Pacific Ocean. The wilderness area borders that of the King Range Wilderness, which is said to be the "longest stretch of undeveloped coastline in the United States outside of Alaska".

== Natural history ==
The river provides wildlife habitat for preservation of rare and endangered species including cold freshwater habitat for fish migration and spawning. The South Fork Eel was historically rich in salmon and other species of anadromous fish, and has been known as the "most productive sub-basin for anadromous fish". The main anadromous fishes in the South Fork are chinook salmon, coho salmon and steelhead, and it is said that "the South Fork Eel River once supported about half of the total coho run for the State of California". Historically, the population of chinook was 20,000 while coho averaged 16,000 at Benbow Dam in the 1930s. Since then, the population has steadily declined, with a current population of roughly 1,000. The reason for the decline is the high amount of silt carried into the river by logging activity and road construction. The silt has filled stream pools and caused higher turbidity, which has harmed fish. The South Fork is said to be the last habitat in the State of California for wild coho.

Several tributaries, such as Hollow Tree Creek, also support anadromous fish, but they have become impaired in ways similar to the South Fork Eel.

== List of tributaries ==
list of tributaries
- Cabin Creek
- Bull Creek
  - Tepee Creek
  - Cow Creek
  - Cornick Creek
  - Calf Creek
  - Miller Creek
  - Harper Creek
  - Squaw Creek
  - Albee Creek
  - Mill Creek
  - Cuneo Creek
    - North Fork Cuneo Creek
  - Burns Creek
  - Panther Creek
- Decker Creek
- Corner Creek
- Mill Creek
- Robinson Creek
- Feese Creek
- Canoe Creek
  - North Fork Canoe Creek
- Mowry Creek
- Coon Creek
- Kerr Creek
- Bridge Creek
- Elk Creek
- Dry Creek
- Salmon Creek
  - Mill Creek
  - South Fork Salmon Creek
    - Bogus Creek
    - Kinsey Creek
    - Tostin Creek
    - Hacker Creek
- Butte Creek
  - Coon Creek
- Fish Creek
- Anderson Creek
- Olvnan Creek
- Rocky Glen Creek
- Hooker Creek
- William Creek
- Tuttle Creek
- Dean Creek
- Leggett Creek
- Redwood Creek
  - Seely Creek
  - Somerville Creek
  - Miller Creek
  - China Creek
    - Dinner Creek
- Bluff Creek
- Bear Canyon Creek
  - South Fork Bear Canyon Creek
- Connick Creek
- Sproul Creek
  - West Fork Sproul Creek
  - Little Sproul Creek
- Sawmill Creek
- East Branch South Fork Eel River
  - Buck Mountain Creek
  - Squaw Creek
    - West Branch Squaw Creek
  - Rancheria Creek
  - Rays Creek
  - Tom Long Creek
    - North Fork Tom Long Creek
  - Cruso Cabin Creek
  - Elkhorn Creek
- Fish Creek
- Durphy Creek
- Hartsook Creek
- Milk Ranch Creek
- Low Gap Creek
- Indian Creek
  - Jones Creek
  - Parker Creek
- Piercy Creek
- Standley Creek
- McCoy Creek
- Bear Pen Creek
  - Cub Creek
- Red Mountain Creek
  - Holohan Gulch
  - Mud Creek
- Wildcat Creek
- Bridges Creek
- Dora Creek
- Mill Creek
- Rock Creek
- Hollow Tree Creek
  - South Fork Hollow Tree Creek
    - Mule Creek
  - Middle Creek
  - Lost Man Creek
  - Lost Pipe Creek
    - Walters Creek
  - Bear Creek
  - Redwood Creek
  - Bond Creek
  - Michaels Creek
    - Doctors Creek
      - Lynch Creek
  - Waldron Creek
  - Bear Pen Creek
  - Huckleberry Creek
    - Bear Wallow Creek
    - Little Bear Wallow Creek
    - Lynch Gap
  - Butler Creek
    - Right Fork Butler Creek
  - Mitchell Creek
- Cedar Creek
  - Little Cedar Creek
  - "Blue Rock Creek"
- Big Dann Creek
  - Little Dann Creek
- Grizzly Creek
- Low Gap Creek
  - Little Low Gap Creek
- Rattlesnake Creek
  - Squaw Creek
  - Measly Creek
  - Wilson Creek
  - Foster Creek
  - Elk Creek
  - Cummings Creek
  - Twin Rocks Creek
  - Grapevine Creek
- Hogshed Creek
- Surveyors Canyon
- Tenmile Creek
  - Peterson Creek
  - Grub Creek
    - Cold Creek
  - Spring Creek
  - Steep Gulch
  - Streeter Creek
    - "Sand Rock Creek"
  - Lewis Creek
  - Big Rock Creek
  - Stapp Creek
  - Wilson Creek
  - Mud Springs Creek
  - Tuttle Creek
  - Little Case Creek
    - Mill Creek
  - Cahto Creek
  - Piggy Springs
- Fox Creek
- McKinley Creek
- Elder Creek
  - Misery Creek
- Jack of Hearts Creek
  - Dark Canyon
- Deer Creek
- Little Charlie Creek
- Dutch Charlie Creek
  - Thompson Creek
  - Eagle Creek
- Redwood Creek
  - North Fork Redwood Creek
- Rock Creek
- Muddy Gulch Creek
- Kenny Creek
- Haun Creek
- Mud Creek
  - Grapevine Creek
- Taylor Creek
- Bear Creek
- Little Rock Creek
- Section Four Creek
- Windem Creek
- Middleton Creek

== See also ==
- List of South Fork Eel River crossings
  - Confusion Hill Bridges
- North Fork Eel River
- Middle Fork Eel River
- Van Duzen River
- List of rivers of California

== Works cited ==
- Barrett, Samuel Alfred (1908). The ethno-geography of the Pomo and neighboring Indians. Harvard University: The University Press.
- Durham, David L. (2001). Durham's Place Names of the California North Coast: Includes Del Norte, Humbolt, Lake, Mendocino & Trinity Counties. Quill Driver Books. ISBN 1-884995-26-8.
- Pike, Charlie (2001). Paddling Northern California. Globe Pequot. ISBN 1-56044-968-3.
