= Lovejoy Homestead =

- U.S. National Register of Historic Places
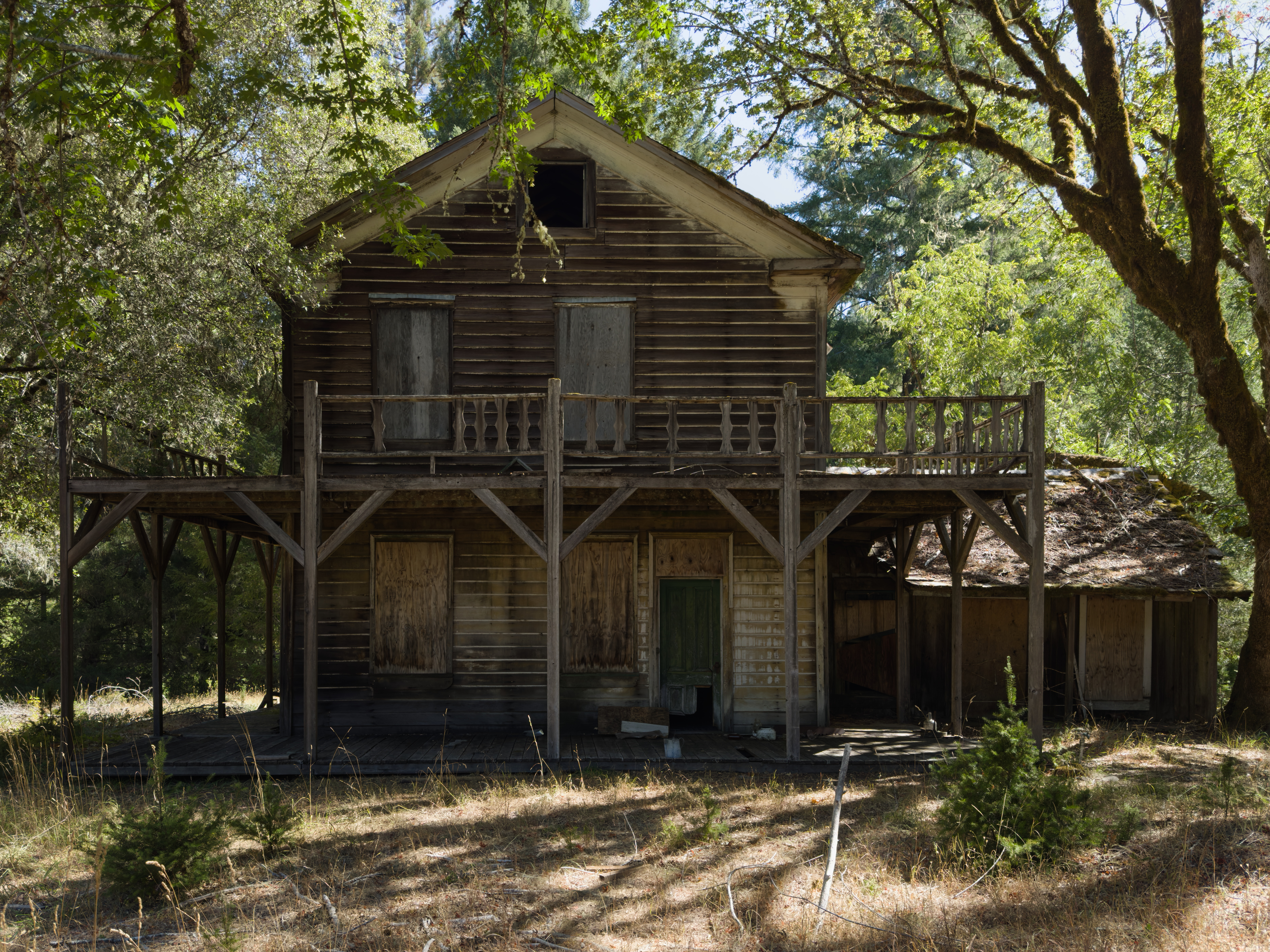
- Lovejoy Homestead in August 2025 showing the main two-story "White House" at center and original cabin at right

- Location within California
- Nearest city: Branscomb, California
- Coordinates: 39°44′52″N 123°38′00″W
- Area: 5.8 acres (2.3 ha)
- Built: 1890
- Built by: George Lovejoy
- NRHP reference No.: 78000719
- Added to NRHP: April 26, 1978

The Lovejoy Homestead, near Branscomb, California in Mendocino County, California, was listed on the National Register of Historic Places in 1978. The listing included four contributing buildings, two contributing structures, and a contributing site on 5.8 acres (2.3 ha).

It is located at end of Wilderness Road, near Branscomb, by the South Fork Eel River.

The site includes a two-story house known also as the "White House" which is Victorian in style, built originally in 1890. It is unusual for having a Victorian house in a very remote location. Also included are a barn, a woodshed, ruins of a blacksmith shop, and an apple orchard.
