= Cahto traditional narratives =

Kato traditional narratives include myths, legends, tales, and oral histories preserved by the Kato (Cahto) people of the Eel River basin of northwestern California.

Kato oral literature has been classified primarily with that of the central California region, but with evident influences from the Northwest Coast and, more tenuously, from the Plateau region. (See also Traditional narratives (Native California).)

== On-Line Examples of Kato Narratives ==
- ''The North American Indian'' by Edward S. Curtis (1924)

== Sources for Kato Narratives ==
- Curtis, Edward S. 1907-1930. The North American Indian. 20 vols. Plimpton Press, Norwood, Massachusetts. (Two myths collected from Bill Ray, vol. 14, pp. 165–166.)
- Erdoes, Richard, and Alfonso Ortiz. 1984. American Indian Myths and Legends. Pantheon Books, New York. (Retelling of a narrative from Gifford and Block 1930, pp. 107–109.)
- Gifford, Edward Winslow, and Gwendoline Harris Block. 1930. California Indian Nights. Arthur H. Clark, Glendale, California. (Two previously published narratives, pp. 79–82 and 153-154.)
- Goddard, Pliny E. 1909. "Kato Texts". University of California Publications in American Archaeology and Ethnology 5:65-238. Berkeley. (Texts collected in 1906 from Bill Ray, including Theft of Fire versions and Bear and Fawns.)
- Kroeber, A. L. 1925. Handbook of the Indians of California. Bureau of American Ethnology Bulletin No. 78. Washington, D.C. (Creation myth, p. 155.)
- Loeb, Edwin M. 1932. "The Western Kuksu Cult". University of California Publications in American Archaeology and Ethnology 33:1-137. Berkeley. (Kato creation myth, pp. 23–25.)
- Thompson, Stith. 1929. Tales of the North American Indians. Harvard University Press, Cambridge, Massachusetts. (Creation myth, pp. 30–37, from Goddard 1909.)
