= South Fork Eel River Wilderness =

Protected wilderness area in California, United States

- IUCN category Ib (wilderness area)
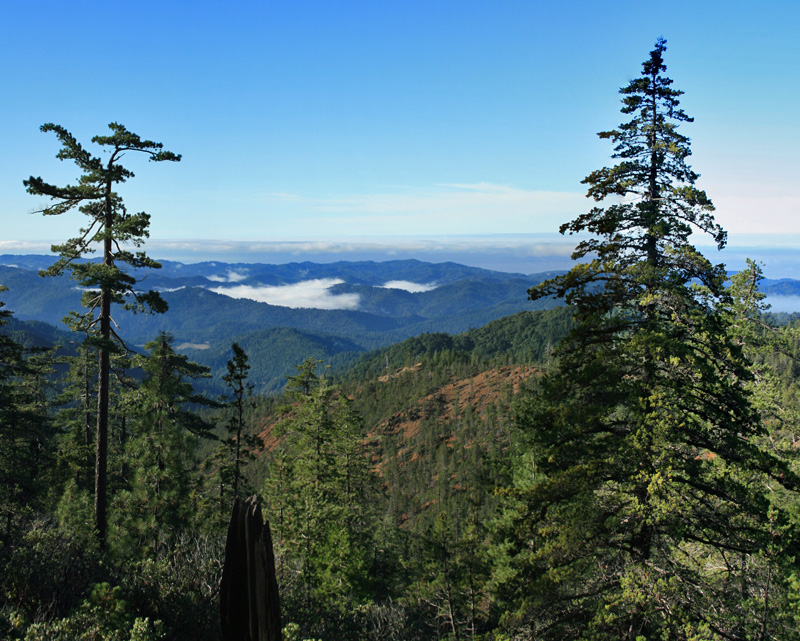
- South Fork of the Eel River framed by sugar pine (Pinus lambertiana) and Sargent cypress (Cupressus sargentii)

- Location within California Location within the United States
- Interactive map of South Fork Eel River Wilderness
- Location: Mendocino County, California, United States
- Nearest city: Willits, California
- Coordinates: 39°53′17″N 123°39′25″W
- Area: 12,868 acres (52.07 km^{2})
- Established: October 17, 2006
- Governing body: Bureau of Land Management

The South Fork Eel River Wilderness is a 12,868-acre (5,207 ha) wilderness area located in Mendocino County, California. The wilderness was added to the National Wilderness Preservation System when the United States Congress passed the Northern California Coastal Wild Heritage Wilderness Act in 2006 (Public Law 109-362). The Department of the Interior's Bureau of Land Management (BLM) is the agency in charge.

== Sections of the wilderness ==
The wilderness is broken into two sections.

=== Red Mountain Unit ===
The Red Mountain unit is dominated by Red Mountain and the Cedar Creek (South Fork Eel River) drainage. Elevations range from 1,100 feet (340 m) at the southwest end along Cedar Creek to 4,083 feet (1,244 m), less than three miles away at the top Red Mountain. Terrain is generally steep, consisting of rugged drainages dropping abruptly into Cedar Creek canyon. A small area of fairly gentle slopes is found near the summit. A zone of reddish soil occupies the central part of the area and contrasts sharply with the surrounding landscape.

These unusual soils have resulted in a unique vegetation cover of several species of pine and cypress trees intermixed with a low brush understory. Rare and endangered plant species occupy the landscape covered by these ultrabasic soils. These rare plants have been isolated over space and time on serpentine rock near the summit of Red Mountain. This edaphic sky island holds the northern range extension of Sargent cypress (Cupressus sargentii). This is also the only location to find Red Mountain buckwheat (Eriogonum kelloggii) and Red Mountain stonecrop (Sedum eastwoodiae). Much of the area is designated and Research Natural Area (RNA) / Area of Critical Environmental Concern (ACEC).

The red soil on Red Mountain is in the Littlered series. It is an Ultisol, a Haplohumult, with nearly 50% iron oxides. The main iron oxide is goethite (FeOOH), with enough hematite(Fe_{2}O_{3})to make the soil red.

=== Cahto Peak Unit ===
The southern section called Cahto Peak unit consists of several Douglas fir forest watersheds, one (Elder Creek) of which is so pristine that it has been designated a Biosphere Reserve, a National Natural Landmark, and a Hydrologic Benchmark. Much of the area is designated an RNA/ACEC.
