= Dyerville, California =

Human settlement in California, United States

Coordinates: 40°21′19″N 123°55′33″W

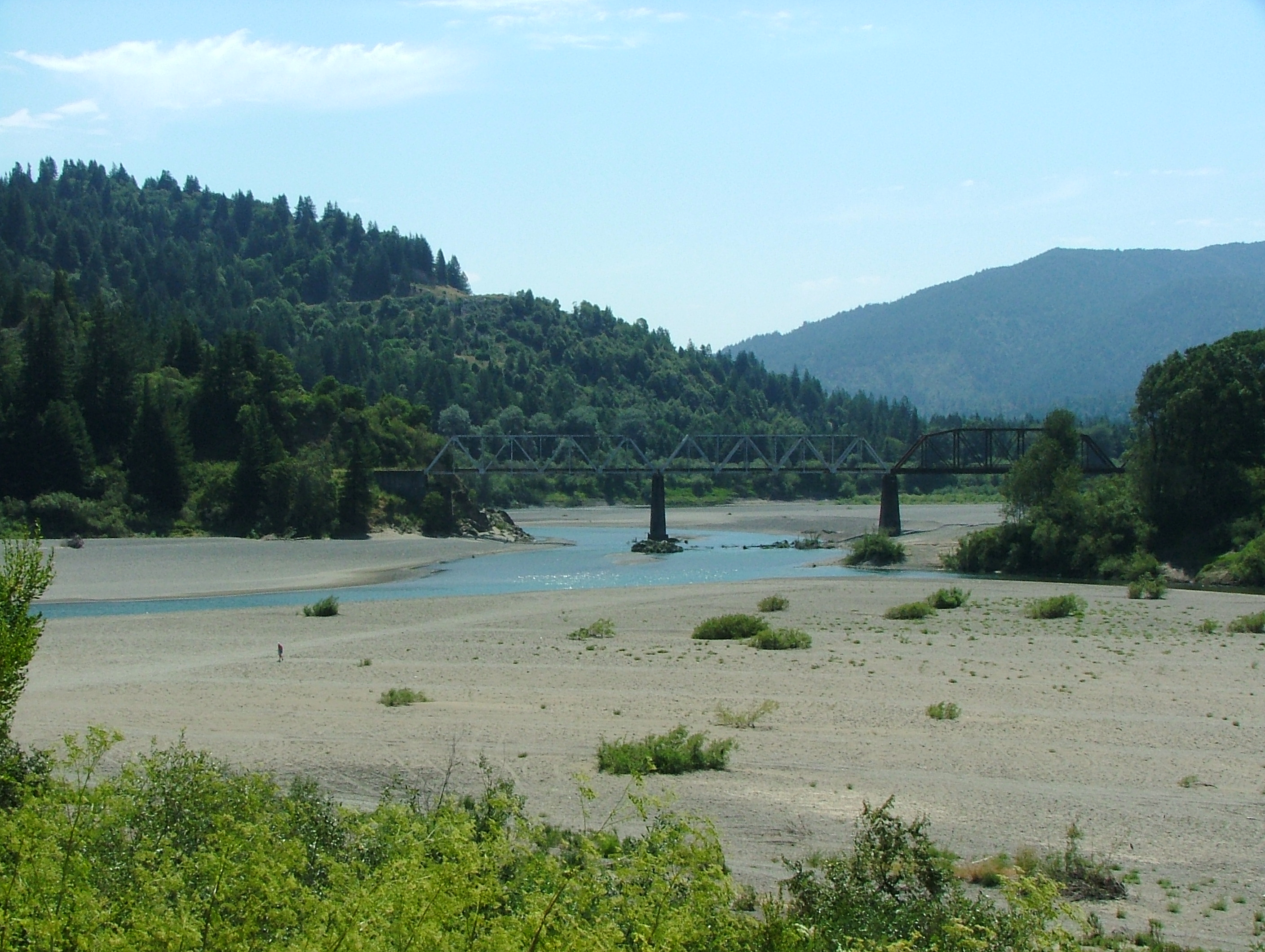
The former Northwestern Pacific Railroad bridge at Dyerville

Dyerville is a former settlement in Humboldt County, California, United States. It was located at an elevation of 246 ft on the northwest bank of the Eel River confluence with the South Fork Eel River, 3 miles (4.8 km) west of Camp Grant. Earliest known development at Dyerville was the operation of a ferry in the 1870s. Dyerville had its own post office from April 17, 1890, to November 30, 1933, when it was moved to South Fork.

Dyerville was a stagecoach stop, a shipping port, and a crossroads town that played an important role in the early settlement of this redwood area. It was destroyed by the flood of 1955.
