= Laytonville Unified School District =

Public school district in California, US

Address
- 150 Ramsey Road Laytonville, Mendocino County, California, 95454; United States
- Coordinates: 39.6856°N 123.4830°W

District information
- Type: Public Unified
- Grades: K through 12^{th}
- Established: July 1, 1981; 45 years ago
- President: Calvin Harwood
- Superintendent: Joan Viada Potter
- Schools: 5: Elementary: 3; High: 1; Alternative: 1
- Budget: $6,325,000 (2015-16)
- NCES District ID: 0642580

Students and staff
- Enrollment: 393 (2016-17)
- Faculty: 24.47 FTE (2016-17)
- Teachers: 41.61 FTE (2016-17)
- Student–teacher ratio: 16.06:1
- Athletic conference: CA Interscholastic Fed.; North Coast Section; Coastal Mountain Conf.; North Central League III

Other information
- Annual spending/student: $15,316 (2015-16)
- Schedule: 180 days/year, M-F, August–June
- Website: www.lusd.us
- Location of district office (gray map pin) within Mendocino County (shown in green)

Laytonville Unified School District is a public school district in Mendocino County, California, United States.
