= Branscomb, California =

Unincorporated community in California, United States

Branscomb
- Unincorporated community
- Location in California Branscomb (the United States)
- Coordinates: 39°39′13″N 123°37′32″W
- Country: United States
- State: California
- County: Mendocino
- Elevation: 1,565 ft (477 m)
- ZIP code: 95417
- Area code: 707
- GNIS feature ID: 1658127

Branscomb is an unincorporated community in Mendocino County, California. It is located on Branscomb Road, approximately 8 miles (13 km) west-southwest of Laytonville in straight-line distance, or 12 miles (19 km) via the local road network. The community sits at an elevation of 1,565 feet (477 m) on a river terrace situated east of the South Fork Eel River.

== Indigenous history ==
The Branscomb area lies within the traditional territory of the Cahto people (also spelled Kato), an Athabaskan-speaking group indigenous to the upper South Fork Eel River drainage. Ethnogeographic records document the area now known as Jackson Valley — where Branscomb is situated — as falling within Cahto territory at the eastern edge of the coastal redwood forest. The Cahto language, an extinct Athabaskan language, was formerly spoken across the Laytonville and Branscomb area. Today, most Cahto descendants are enrolled in the federally recognized Cahto Indian Tribe of the Laytonville Rancheria, located approximately 8 miles (13 km) east of Branscomb near Laytonville.

== Naming and settlement ==
The community takes its name from Benjamin Franklin Branscomb (1832–1921), who was born in Jackson, Ohio, and traveled to California in 1857 by joining an ox-team wagon train. After farming in Sonoma County for approximately twenty years, he relocated to Jackson Valley in Mendocino County in 1880, where he homesteaded 160 acres (0.65 km^{2}) under the Homestead Act and an additional 40 acres (0.16 km^{2}) under the Timber Act. He established the area's first school and later converted his home into a hotel, adding a grocery store, meat market, and livery stable as the settlement grew. In 1894, Branscomb opened the community's first post office; as the locality had no official name at the time, it was named after him as postmaster. After his death in 1921, his son John operated the property until 1959, when he sold it to the Harwood family.

== History ==
The Harwood family established Harwood Products, a sawmill operation in Branscomb, beginning in 1948 after purchasing 120 acres (0.49 km^{2}) from John Branscomb in 1943. The mill operated for approximately sixty years and served as the economic anchor of the community. In 2007, the mill filed for bankruptcy and closed permanently in 2008. The Branscomb store and post office subsequently closed in 2016. The surrounding area remains lightly populated, heavily timbered, and is designated as a high-wildfire-risk area under county planning metrics.

The nearby Lovejoy Homestead, built in 1890 by George Lovejoy approximately 5 miles (8 km) north of Branscomb, was listed on the National Register of Historic Places in 1978.

== Geography and geology ==
Geologically, Branscomb sits near the fractured northern reaches of the Maacama fault zone, where a series of tectonic strand basins branch westward through the hills of western Long Valley from the Laytonville area toward Branscomb. The nearby Jackson Valley Mineral Springs, which emerge from rock-walled sandstone basins, have historically been associated with the local Branscomb post office in Jackson Valley.

During the historic December 1964 California floods, the area experienced severe weather; Branscomb recorded the highest six-day rainfall total within the entire Eel River basin, reaching 31.71 inches (80.54 cm).

== Ecology ==
The aquatic environment around Branscomb plays a notable role in North Coast salmonid conservation. The streams in the Branscomb area — including Cedar Creek, Kinney Creek, and Dutch Charlie Creek — are narrow, well-shaded, and colder than the lower reaches of the drainage network. This microclimate provides critical habitat supporting high juvenile and yearling production of steelhead trout and silver (coho) salmon.

In the summer of 1921, state fish culturists established the Branscomb Experimental Egg Collecting Station on the South Fork Eel River to trap adult salmonids and harvest eggs to supply the Fort Seward Hatchery. The United States Geological Survey (USGS) monitors long-term water quality data in the area via the Elder Creek hydrologic benchmark station.

Approximately 0.25 miles (0.40 km) north of Branscomb lies the Cantwell Soda Spring, a natural ravine spring that produces carbonated water.

== Climate ==
Branscomb has a warm-summer Mediterranean climate (Köppen Csb), characterized by warm, dry summers with average monthly temperatures not exceeding 71.6 °F (22.0 °C), and mild, wet winters.

== History ==
Benjamin Franklin Branscomb joined an ox-team wagon train that was headed for California in 1857. He was born in Jackson, Ohio, in 1832, the son of Joseph Edmond Branscomb. The family moved to DeKalb County, Missouri, where Joseph became Sheriff. According to family tradition, Joseph, a staunch abolitionist, was shot and killed 3 days before President Lincoln was assassinated, but a contemporary newspaper account says Joseph was shot to death by a Mr. Jacob J. Stoffel in Maysville in July 1865, several months after Lincoln's assassination.

Benjamin later settled in Sonoma County and farmed there for about twenty years. He married one of the daughters of the captain of the wagon train, Mary Jane Taylor, and they had 10 children: 6 boys and 4 girls. They moved to Jackson Valley, Mendocino, in 1880, where he homesteaded 160 acres (0.65 km^{2}) of land and 40 acres (160,000 m^{2}) more under the Timber Act. He was instrumental in starting the first school in that area. He built a large home which, after his family grew up, he turned into a hotel. A small grocery store, meat market and livery stable were added later. After more people came into the area, he established a post office, which first opened in 1894. Since the place had no official name, it was named after him, the postmaster. After his death in 1921, one of his sons, John, inherited the property and ran it until 1959, when he sold it to the Harwood family, who built the timber mill in Branscomb called Harwood Products.

== Government ==
In the California State Legislature, Branscomb is in the 2nd senatorial district, represented by Democrat Mike McGuire, and in the 2nd Assembly district, represented by Democrat Chris Rogers.

In the United States House of Representatives, Branscomb is in California's 2nd congressional district, represented by Democrat Jared Huffman.

== Nearby ==
The Cantwell Soda Spring, a natural spring of carbonated water is located 0.25 miles (0.40 km) north of Branscomb.

== Climate ==
This region experiences warm (but not hot) and dry summers, with no average monthly temperatures above 71.6 °F (22.0 °C). According to the Köppen Climate Classification system, Branscomb has a warm-summer Mediterranean climate, abbreviated Csb on climate maps.
