= East Branch South Fork Eel River =

River in Mendocino County, California, US

Location
- Country: United States
- State: California
- District: Mendocino County

Physical characteristics
- Source: Bell Springs Mountain
  - coordinates: 39.5610°N 123.3711°W
- Mouth: South Fork Eel River
  - coordinates: 40.0404°N 123.4727°W
- Length: 25 mi (40 km)
- Basin size: 59 mi^{2} (150 km^{2})

The East Branch South Fork Eel River, a tributary of the South Fork Eel River, is formed by the confluence of Cruso Cabin Creek and Elkhorn Creek, in Mendocino County in the U.S. state of California. The river is roughly 25 miles (40 km) long, meandering west to its confluence with the South Fork Eel at Benbow State Recreation Area. Major tributaries of the East Branch include Buck Mountain Creek, Squaw Creek, Rays Creek, and Tom Long Creek. The river flows west, turns north, and flows west again, through rugged terrain in the Coast Range of California. The East Branch is the South Fork Eel's largest tributary.
