= Cahto, California =

Former settlement in California, US

Coordinates: 39.6544°N 123.5272°W

Cahto is a former settlement in Mendocino County, California, United States. It was located 3 miles (4.8 km) southwest of Laytonville.

Cahto was founded by John P. Simpson and Robert White in 1856. They built a hotel there in 1861, and a store in 1865. A post office operated at Cahto from 1863 to 1901. The Independent Order of Odd Fellows maintained Cahto Lodge No. 206 in the town as well, which met in a two-story hall constructed in 1872 that doubled as a public hall and meeting place.

"Cahto" means "lake" in the language of the local Pomo people.
