= Cedar Creek (South Fork Eel River tributary) =

Stream in California, United States

Location
- Country: United States
- State: California
- District: Mendocino County

Physical characteristics
- Source: Red Mountain, California
  - coordinates: 39.5430°N 123.3643°W
  - elevation: 778 ft (237 m)
- Mouth: South Fork Eel River
  - coordinates: 39.5020°N 123.4230°W
- Length: 11.2 mi (18.0 km)

Cedar Creek is an 11.2-mile-long (18.0 km) tributary of the South Fork Eel River in Mendocino County in the U.S. state of California. The creek begins southeast of Red Mountain, at an elevation of 778 feet (237 m). It makes an S-curve west-northwest then bends sharply south, dropping into the valley of the South Fork Eel. The confluence is south of the city of Leggett, on the river's right bank. The only named tributary of Cedar Creek is Little Cedar Creek, a headwaters tributary. Big Dann Creek joins the South Fork Eel on the same bank, just upstream of Cedar Creek, while the next major tributary downstream of Cedar is Rock Creek. The Cedar Creek watershed is rugged and has few tributaries.

== See also ==
- List of rivers of California
