= Benbow State Recreation Area =

Camping area in Humboldt County, California

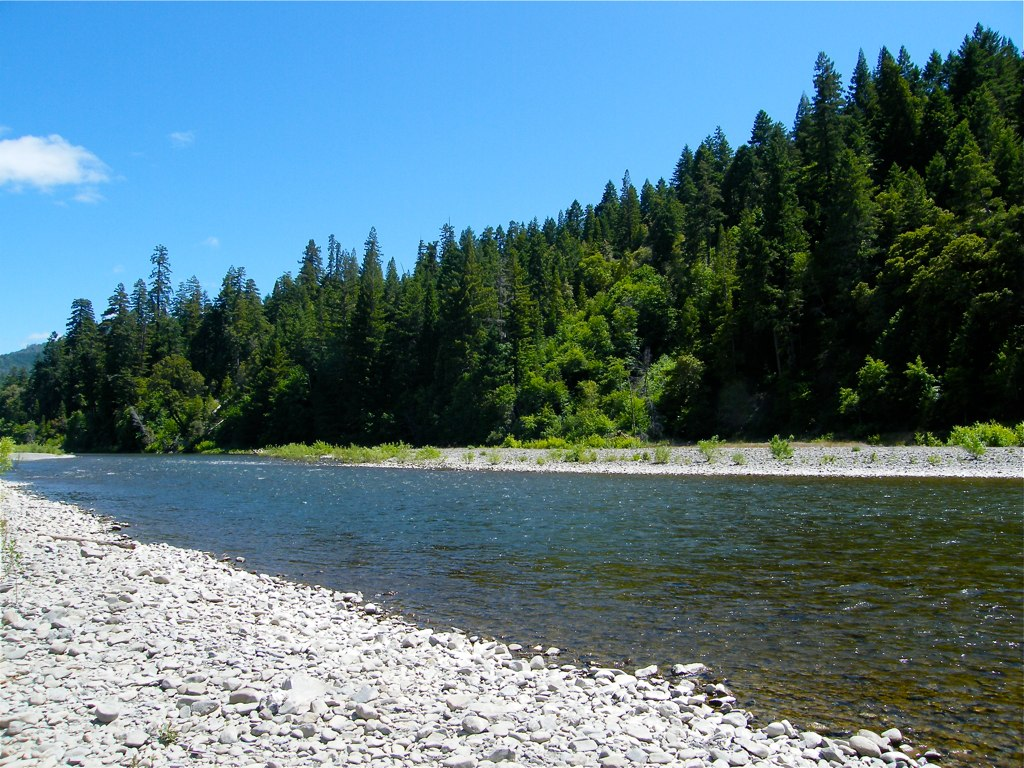

- Location within California Location within the United States
- Location: Humboldt County, California, United States
- Nearest city: Garberville, California
- Coordinates: 40°3′43″N 123°47′36″W
- Area: 1,142 acres (4.62 km^{2})
- Established: 1958
- Governing body: California Department of Parks and Recreation
- Website: Official website

Benbow State Recreation Area is a state park unit of the state of California in the United States. It is located in Humboldt County 2 miles (3.2 km) south of Garberville on U.S. Route 101 on the South Fork Eel River.

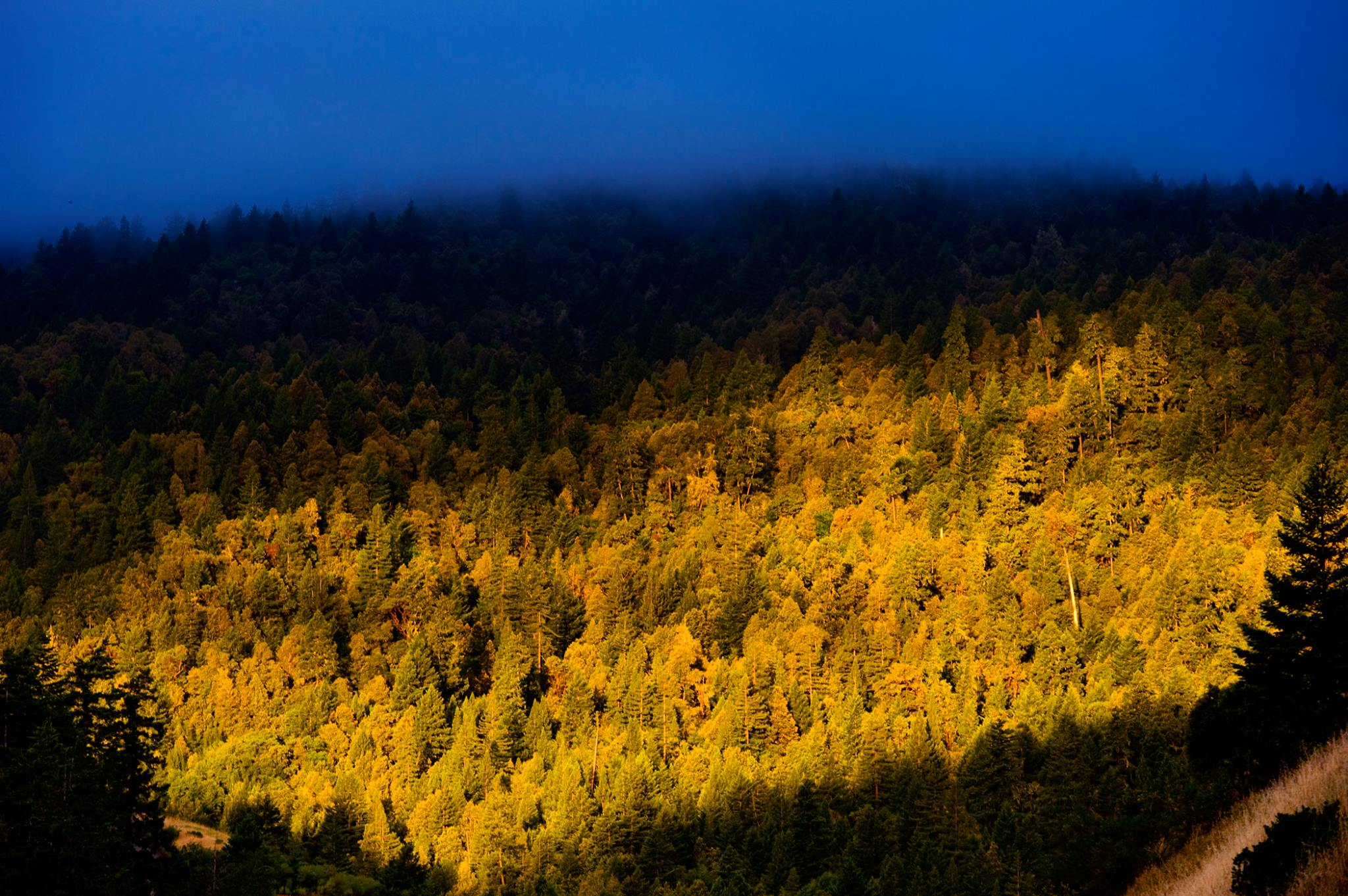
Foliage at Benbow State Recreation Area

Benbow dam was constructed across the South Fork Eel River in 1931 to provide hydroelectric power for development in Garberville, impounding a reservoir. The Benbow family, interested in preserving the natural scene along the river, made efforts to place the land under state protection. In 1956 funds were approved for the Benbow Project and the first 207 acres (84 ha) were purchased in 1958. Due to the negative impact on the migrating salmon and damage to the river banks, work began to remove the dam in August 2016. In the winter of 2017, removal of the dam was completed.

The park has grown to 1,142 acres (462 ha). There are campsites and a large day-use picnic area. Hiking, picnicking and camping are popular summer time activities, while salmon and steelhead fishing are popular in the winter.

== See also ==
- List of California state parks
- Benbow Inn
- Benbow, California
