= Richardson Grove State Park =

State park in California

- Redwoods tower over the Eel River on either bank.

- Location within California Location within the United States
- Location: Humboldt County, California, United States
- Nearest city: Rio Del
- Coordinates: 40°01′N 123°48′W
- Area: 2,000 acres (8.1 km^{2})
- Established: 1922
- Governing body: California Department of Parks and Recreation

Richardson Grove State Park is located at the southernmost border of Humboldt County, 75 miles (121 km) south of Eureka, California, United States, and 200 miles (320 km) north of San Francisco. The year-round park, which has approximately 2,000 acres (8.1 km^{2}), straddles US 101, causing the narrowest point of its entire distance. Said to have the 9th largest tree of all remaining Coast Redwoods, it is known for swimming on the South Fork of the Eel River and day use in addition to 159 campsites.

The park is named after Friend Richardson, the 25th Governor of California between 1923 and 1927.

== Road widening ==
The first road through Richardson Grove, eventually to become US 101, was constructed in approximately 1915 and first surfaced, most likely with gravel and oil, in 1927. A proposed project to adjust the alignment of Route 101 both inside and outside park boundaries to accommodate industry standard-sized trucks in compliance with the Surface Transportation Assistance Act of 1982 (STAA) has been in development by Caltransc. STAA-compliant vehicles are currently prohibited north of Leggett, California, on Route 101 through Richardson Grove State Park. The feasibility of constructing a four-lane bypass of Richardson Grove State Park was analyzed in 2001, but deemed infeasible due to the high cost and/or environmental disruption.

Some north coast businesses, whose success is tied to shipping out of the area, favor the project. According to Caltrans, 54 trees under 24 inches (610 mm) in diameter, none of which are old growth redwoods, would be removed for the project (32 trees in the park and 24 trees outside of the park). Trees to be removed would not all be redwood, but would include Douglas Fir, Big Leaf Maple, Live Oak, Tan Oak, and Red Alder. A total of two redwoods would be removed within the park itself.

There are several preservation groups against the currently proposed changes in the road alignment. One of these groups, the Save the Redwoods League, worked with the state to increase the park to around 1,750 acres (710 ha). Groups and community members against the project, whose website is entitled "Save Richardson Grove," posit that the result of widening the highway may cause Humboldt County to become a casualty of unlimited commercial development. Some suggest, by removing redwoods from the grove, there would be adverse effects on the root systems of remaining massive old-growth redwoods, even causing death to unintended trees and habitat.

== Campgrounds ==
Richardson Grove State Park offers 160 campsites and a large group site across three campgrounds: Huckleberry, Madrone, and Oak Flat. The campsites are mainly intended for tent camping but some can accommodate RVs/Trailers. Formerly, cabins were also available for rent. Each site has a picnic table, a food locker, a fire pit, and coin-operated showers are available at nearby restrooms.

The state park has a Visitors Center offering displays on the natural wildlife in the surrounding area, a general store, and offers hiking, swimming, fishing and picnic sites near the Eel River.

== Climate ==
Climate data for Richardson Grove State Park, California, 1961–2012
Month	Jan	Feb	Mar	Apr	May	Jun	Jul	Aug	Sep	Oct	Nov	Dec	Year
Mean daily maximum °F (°C)	50.1 (10.1)	54.6 (12.6)	59.5 (15.3)	64.3 (17.9)	71.5 (21.9)	78.0 (25.6)	86.1 (30.1)	86.6 (30.3)	83.2 (28.4)	70.3 (21.3)	55.7 (13.2)	49.3 (9.6)	67.4 (19.7)
Mean daily minimum °F (°C)	37.3 (2.9)	38.5 (3.6)	39.5 (4.2)	41.0 (5.0)	45.3 (7.4)	49.9 (9.9)	53.1 (11.7)	52.9 (11.6)	49.3 (9.6)	44.7 (7.1)	40.9 (4.9)	37.5 (3.1)	44.2 (6.8)
Average precipitation inches (mm)	13.20 (335)	10.34 (263)	8.87 (225)	4.53 (115)	1.88 (48)	0.64 (16)	0.06 (1.5)	0.37 (9.4)	0.91 (23)	3.88 (99)	9.64 (245)	13.69 (348)	68.01 (1,727)
Average snowfall inches (cm)	0.1 (0.25)	0.0 (0.0)	0.1 (0.25)	0.0 (0.0)	0.0 (0.0)	0.0 (0.0)	0.0 (0.0)	0.0 (0.0)	0.0 (0.0)	0.0 (0.0)	0.0 (0.0)	0.1 (0.25)	0.3 (0.76)
Average precipitation days (≥ 0.01 in)	15	13	13	10	5	2	0	1	2	6	13	15	97
Source: WRCC
