= Confusion Hill Bridges =

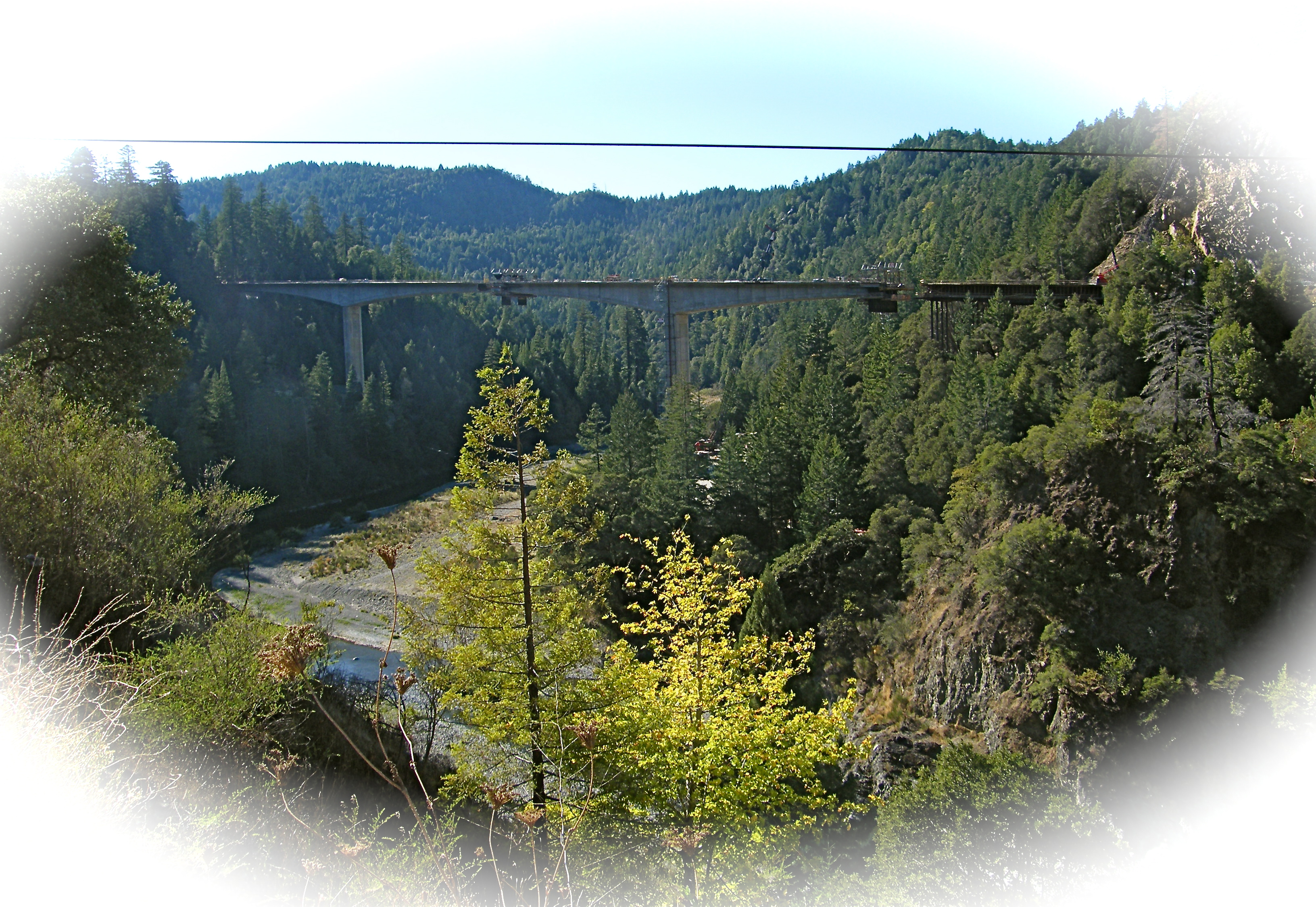
- The south span of the bridge nearing completion, looking southwestwards from near Highway 101
- Coordinates: 39°55′37.83″N 123°45′38.36″W; 39°55′16.58″N 123°45′47.09″W
- Carries: Two lanes of US 101
- Crosses: South Fork Eel River
- Locale: Mendocino County, California
- Official name: Elizabeth Jane Rosewarne Bridge (North)/Mignon Stoddard Lilley Bridge (South)
- Maintained by: Caltrans

Characteristics
- Design: Closed-spandrel beam bridge (north), cantilever bridge (south)
- Material: Concrete, steel
- Total length: 531 feet (162 m) (north bridge) and 1,239 feet (378 m) (south bridge)
- Width: 40 feet (12 m) (approximately, for both bridges)
- Height: 140 feet (43 m) (north bridge), 255 feet (78 m) (south bridge)
- No. of spans: 3 (north), 3 (south)

History
- Construction end: November 2008 (north bridge), July 2009 (south bridge)

Location
- Interactive map of Confusion Hill Bridges

The Confusion Hill Bridges (a.k.a. Confusion Hill Realignment, Confusion Hill Bypass or South Fork Eel River Bridges) are a pair of high bridges carrying two lanes of U.S. Route 101 over the South Fork Eel River in Mendocino County in the U.S. state of California. The bridges were constructed to reroute approximately 1.7 miles (2.7 km) of the highway away from a massive landslide area on the south bank of the river. The north bridge was finished in July 2009 and the south bridge completed in September 2009; the whole bypass was officially opened to traffic in October of that year.

== History ==
The Confusion Hill realignment bypasses the "Confusion Hill slide", a reach of unstable hillside about 1,000 feet (300 m) long and 3,000 feet (910 m) wide. Prior to the realignment this slide would shift during heavy rains, causing damage to the roadway and delays to traffic.

The bridges were designed by the California Department of Transportation (Caltrans), and the contractors were MCM Construction Inc. and the Finley Engineering Group. The north bridge was begun on July 26, 2006 and it was completed in November 2008. Before the south bridge was finished, the north bridge was used to carry construction debris out of the realignment site on the opposite bank. The south bridge was begun in November 2006 and its two piers were completed by November 2008.

While the north bridge was opened in July 2009, the south bridge, which was also finished in July 2009, was opened in September 2009 and the Confusion Hill Realignment project was completed in October 2009. The total cost of this project is estimated at $67 million.

The bridges are collectively named after the nearby roadside attraction Confusion Hill. The two individual bridges were named after two pioneers, Elizabeth Jane Rosewarne and Mignon Stoddard Lilley.

== Description ==
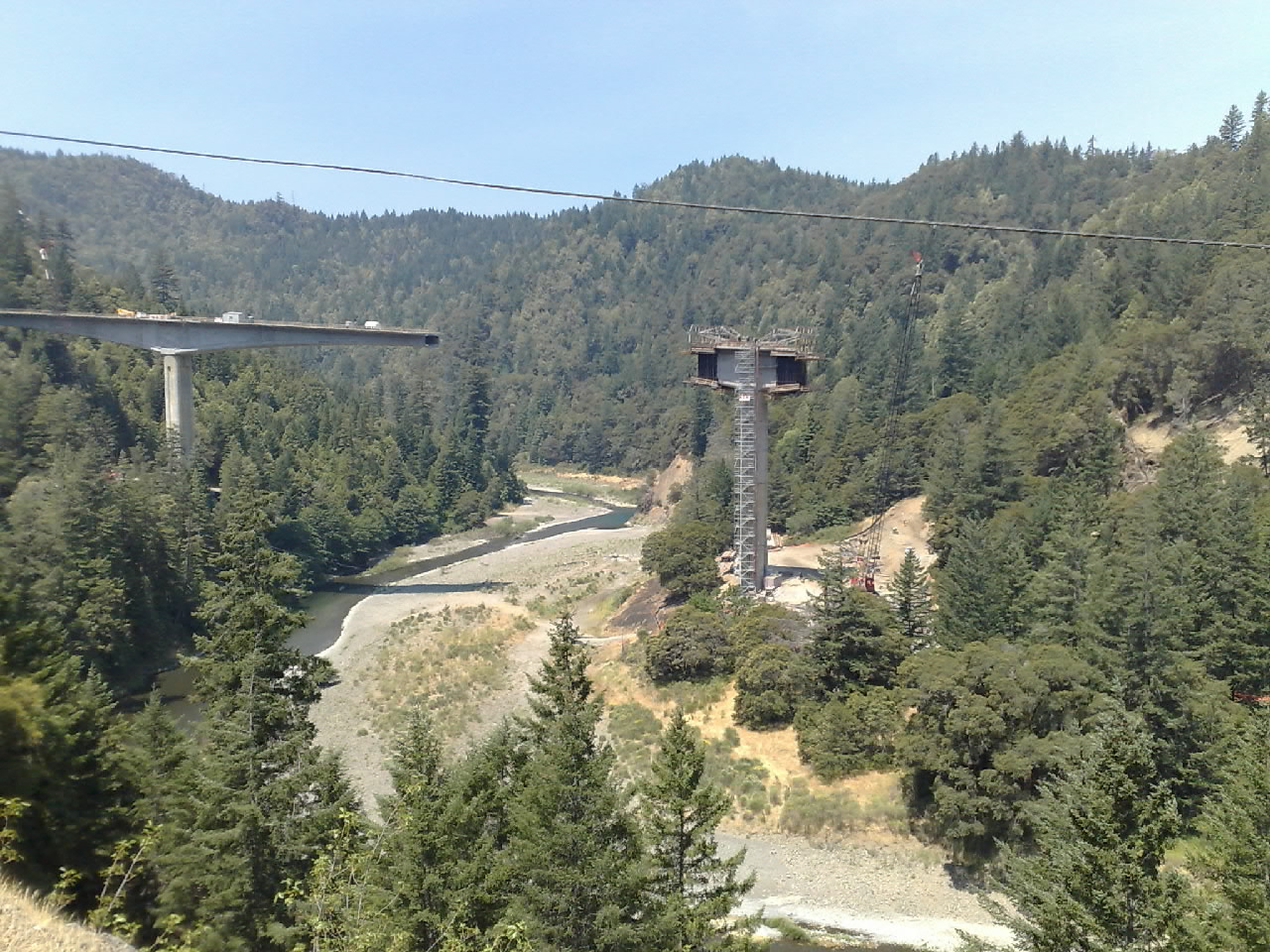
The south bridge under construction with one cantilever span completed, June 2008

The two spans of the Confusion Hill Realignment are located about 8 miles (13 km) north of Leggett. The site is located at a bend in the South Fork Eel River that takes it from a north-flowing course to turn east, north and west. The original path of Highway 101 follows the outside curve of this bend, while the realignment consists of two bridges, a north and south span, on opposite sides of the bend. The realigned portion of the roadway follows the bank of the South Fork opposite from the current bank the roadway follows. The northern bridge is 140 feet (43 m) high and has three spans totaling 531 feet (162 m) in length. The southern bridge is larger, at 255 feet (78 m) above the river and 1,239 feet (378 m) long. Both bridges are concrete beam bridges with two piers and three spans.

The north bridge has two slanted piers that are supported on the hills surrounding the river. Each pier measures 17.5 feet (5.3 m) by 6.9 feet (2.1 m). The south bridge has three spans that are 348 feet (106 m), 571 feet (174 m), and 436 feet (133 m) in length, while its deck is 43 feet (13 m) wide. It has two straight piers that support the side spans that extend out towards the center using cantilevers. The center span rests on these two cantilevers. The spans are actually slightly arched with a maximum depth of 31.4 feet (9.6 m) and a minimum of 11.5 feet (3.5 m).

This new [south] bridge is a 3-span variable depth structure consisting of cast-in-place segmental concrete box girder. The spans of the bridge are 106m, 174m and 133m. The bridge deck is 13m wide. The superstructure will be built utilizing the balanced cantilever construction method from the two interior piers and cast-in-place construction on falsework at the abutments. The superstructure of the bridge varies in depth from is 9.6m deep at Pier Nos. 2 and 3 to 3.5m at the ends and mid span of the bridge.

== See also ==
- List of bridges in the United States by height
