= Cahto =

Indigenous Californian group of Native Americans

Cahto people
Kooʾyoohaang
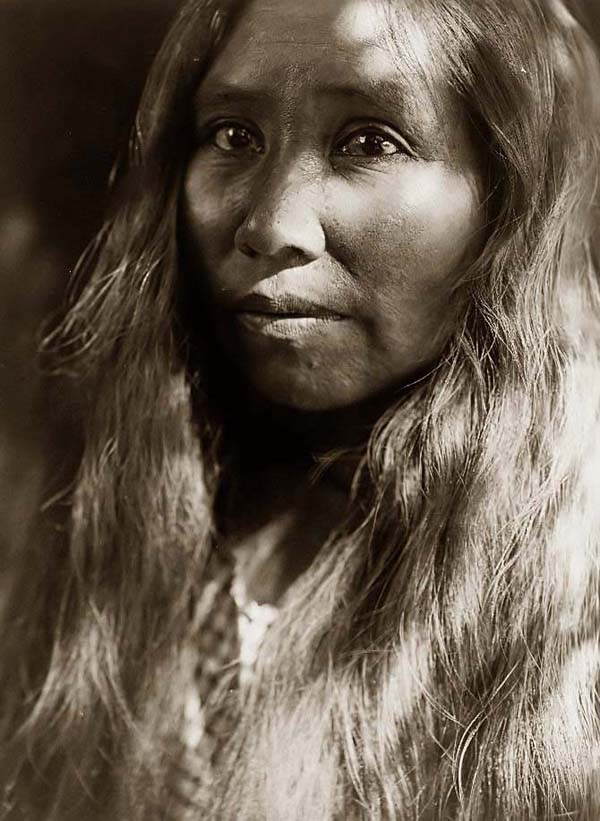
- Cahto woman, photographed by Edward S. Curtis in 1924

Total population
- 259 enrolled members on reservation (2010)

Regions with significant populations
- United States ( California)

Languages
- English, formerly Cahto

Related ethnic groups
- Southern Athabaskan people (including Chilula, Hupa, Mattole, Tolowa, Wailaki, and Whilkut)

The Cahto (also spelled Kato, especially in anthropological and linguistic contexts) are an Indigenous Californian group of Native Americans. Today most descendants are enrolled as the federally recognized tribe, the Cahto Indian Tribe of the Laytonville Rancheria, and a small group of Cahto are enrolled in the Round Valley Indian Tribes of the Round Valley Reservation.

== Name ==
Cahto (Kato) means loosely "People of the Lake" or "Lake People," and may derive from the Northern Pomo word for "lake", which referred to an important Cahto village site, called Djilbi. Therefore the Cahto are sometimes referred to as the Kaipomo or Kato people. The Cahto (Kato) called themselves Tlʾoh-kiiyaahaang, or "Grass People." Today they use Kooʾyoohaang or Cahto Tribe as their tribal designation.

== Reservation ==
Location of Laytonville Rancheria

The tribe controls the Laytonville Rancheria (39°40′09″N 123°30′02″W), also known as the Cahto Rancheria (Kato: Tcʾibeetaahkwot), a federal Indian reservation of Cahto and Pomo people. The rancheria is 264 acres (1.07 km^{2}) large and located three miles (4.8 km) west of Laytonville in Mendocino County. It was founded in 1906. The reservation's population is about 188.

== Cahto flag ==
The Cahto flag, representing their sovereign nation, features a stylized bear claw outlined in white and centered on a black pictograph representing the Cahto ancestral lake home. The pictograph is centered on a red field surrounded with a white and red border. The Words "CAHTO TRIBE" is written in white block letters above the lake pictograph. The bear claw is placed to indicate the importance of the bear as one of their most important tribal totems. The lake symbol denotes their ancestral lands, the color red indicates the blood of their people, white is for the purity of their spirit, and the black is for the rich lake bottomland that sustained their ancestors. This flag is of modern creation and not traditional. It was adopted in 2013.

== Government ==
The Cahto Indian Tribe is run by a democratically elected tribal council. The current tribal executive committee is:

- Misty Davidson, Chairwoman
- Tasheena Sloan, Vice-Chair,
- Kendra Campbell, Secretary-Treasurer
- Cristy Nelson, Member at Large.

The tribe operates its own housing authority, tribal police, and EPA office. Economic development comes from revenues generated by the tribe's Red Fox Casino, located in Laytonville.

== Language ==
The Kato language is one of four Athabaskan languages that were spoken in northwestern California. The others were Eel River Athabaskan (to which Kato is most similar), Mattole-Bear River, and Hupa-Chilula. Most Kato speakers were also bilingual in Northern Pomo.

== History ==
The Kato lived farthest south of all the Athapascans in California, occupying Cahto Valley and Long Valley, and in general the country south of Blue Rock and between the headwaters of the two main branches of Eel River. This region comprises rolling hills and oak savannas and is veined with streams. Most of these are nearly dry during the dry summers but are torrential during the rainy winters.

In the early 18th century, the Cahto lived in approximately 50 village sites. Several villages were organized into bands (band names, village name + gentilic suffix (tribe, people of place) kiiyaahaan(gn)):

- Gaakee-kiiyaahaangn or Gaakee band: village Gaashlai ("Yew Top village")
- Gaashtcʾeengʾaading-kiiyaahaangn or Yew Sticks Out Place band: village Gaashtcʾeengʾaading ("Yew Sticks Out Place village")
- Konteelhtc-kiiyaahaangn or Streeter Creek Valley band: village Chilhsaitcding ("Little Dry Tree Place"), Kaachʾaangʾchowkʾit ("Redemeyer's Place rancheria"), Konteelhtcbiiʾ1 ("Streeter Creek Valley"), Nooniitcingʾangding ("Grizzly Den Place"), Nooniitcing-uuʾaangʾchiiʾ ("Grizzly's Den Creek Mouth"), Saakʾeeninsinchineeʾding / Saakʾeeninsinding ("Streeter Creek Ridge village"), Saisʾaantcbiiʾ ("Lower Pasture"), Seeghaaʾlaiʾ ("Rock Moss Top village"), Seeyeeh-ntcʾeeʾtcding ("Bad Rock Shelter Place"), Tinishtʾanʾchowbiiʾ ("Big Manzanita Valley"), Yiishtc-Silhtiinding ("Streeter Creek mouth village"), Yiishtc-Silhtiinkwot ("2nd Streeter Creek village")
- Koshbiiʾ-kiiyaahaang or Mill Creek band, also Blackberry Valley band: village Binkʾaabiiʾ ("Lake Valley village"), Gaashkwot ("Yew Creek"), Koshbiiʾ ("Mill Creek Valley village"), Koshbiiʾ ("2nd Mill Creek Valley village"), Naadeelʾnaatʾaaʾding ("Sugar Pine Standing village"), Neeʾtaangʾailaiʾ ("Land Extends Into Water peak"), Seekʾaiʾnaangʾaiʾkwot ("Deerbrush Extends Across Creek village"), Tlʾohkʾiikwot ("2nd Prairie Creek village")
- Neeʾlhsowchiiʾ-kiiyaahaangn or Mud Springs Creek Mouth band, also Blue Earth Creek Mouth band: village Neeʾlhsowchiiʾ ("Mud Springs Creek Mouth village")
- Neeʾlhtciiktiskwoh-kiiyaahaangn or Above Red Ground Creek band: village Neeʾlhtciikchowtis ("Above Big Red Earth village")
- Seenchaagh-kiiyaahaangn or Big Rock band: village Lhtaaghtaahding ("Among the Black Oaks Place village"), Saaktooʾchowding (" Big Spring Place village"), Saaktooʾding ("Spring Place"), Seenchaagh ("Big Rock"), Seenchaahding ("Big Rock Rancheria"), Seenchaahkwot ("Big Rock Creek village"), Tcʾibeetctaahding ("Little Douglas Firs Village"), Tinishtʾangʾkooghingʾaading ("Manzanita Runs Down village"), Tnaaʾsʾaanding ("Milkweed Lies Place village"), Tnaaʾsʾaankwot ("Upper Mud Springs Creek")
- Seetaahding-kiiyaahaangn or Little Rock Creek band, also Rocks Place band, Among the Rocks Place band: village Seetaahding ("Little Rock Creek village")
- Seeyeehkoh-kiiyaahaangn or Tuttle Creek band, also Rock Shelter Creek band: village Seelshooltcʾeengʾaading ("Grinding Stone Sticks Out village"), Seeyeehkwot ("Tuttle Creek")
- Siinkook-kiiyaahaangn or Siintkwot-kiiyaahaangn ("Jackson Valley band"), also Branscomb band, syn: Siintkwot-kiiyaahaang ("South Fork Eel River band"): village Beehshoochinmiiʾ ("Horseshoe Bend"), Kʾashtaakashbiiʾ ("Alder Falls in Water Valley"), Lheetcghaaʾtoochiiʾ ("Jack of Hearts Creek Mouth village"), Seenaansaankwot ("2nd Rock Creek camp"), Siinteekwot ("South Fork Eel River"), Tcʾibeetooʾlaiʾ ("Douglas Fir Water Top"), Tcʾiitinchowding / Tciitinchowding / Tlʾohlhgaichiiʾ ("Redwood Creek Mouth village"), Tlʾohlhgaikwot ("Redwood Creek"), Tlʾohtooʾtcchiiʾ ("2nd Little Charlie Creek Mouth"), Tlʾohtooʾtckwot ("Little Charlie Creek")
- Tcʾeetinding-kiiyaahaangn or Trail Comes Out band: village Saaktooʾneesding ("Long Spring village"), Tcʾeetinding ("Trail Comes Out village"), Tlʾohtooʾtcchiiʾ ("Little Prairie Water Creek Mouth village")
- Tcʾibeetaahding-kiiyaahaangn or Tcʾibeetaahkwot-kiiyaahaangn ("Cahto Creek band"), also Among the Douglas Firs Place band, Among the Douglas Firs Creek band: village Chinsʾaanding ("Tree Lies Place (at Laytonville cemetery)"), Seekʾaiʾbinghaading ("Deerbrush Edge village"), Tcʾibeetaahding ("Cahto Creek village"), Tcʾibeetaahkwot / Tcʾbeetckwot ("Cahto Creek village"), Neeʾlhtciiklhgishding ("Red Earth Gap place"), Neeʾlhtciitcchineeʾding ("Red Earth Base village"), Seelhsowkaanaatinding ("Blue Rock Crossroad village"), Tlʾohsaks-uuningʾ ("Horsetail Hillside")
- Tcʾindinteelhaatc-kiiyaahaangn or Sick Man Jump band: village Tcʾindinteelhagh-uuyeeh ("Sick Man Jump Under village")
- Tlʾoh-kiiyaahaangn or Long Valley band, also Laytonville band, Grass band: village Banʾtcnaandeehding ("Laytonville Bridge area camp"), Banʾtcnoondilyeegh ("Flies Settle Under"), Chinsʾaanding ("Tree Lies Place (at Laytonville cemetery)"), Diltciikninsingkwot ("Wilson Creek"), Distʾeegits'-iiyiw ("Under Crooked Madrone village"), Konteelhbiiʾ ("Long Valley"), Neeʾboosheeʾkwʾit ("Bumpy Ground Hilltop"), Seelhgaichineeʾding ("2nd White Rock Base camp"), NSeelhgaitcʾeeliinding ("White Rock Outflow Place village"), Shaahnaaʾ ("Ten Mile Creek"), Tlʾohkʾiikwot ("Prairie Creek"), Uusiiʾding ("Head Place Rancheria")
- Toodjilhbiiʾ-kiiyaahaangn or Cahto Valley band, also Wet Water band, Lake band, Kato-Pomo, syn: Naahneesh Toodjilhbii ("People of Cahto"): village Chʾingchiinooldeel ("Noise Went Down spring"), Chʾingkiiʾnooldeelʾlai ("Noise Went Down Top village"), Chinlhgaichowding ("White Log village"), Chʾnankaabiiʾ ("Deer Lick In It village"), Gaashtckwot ("Rancheria Creek"), Kai-kwontaah("Cahto Rancheria"), Seelhgaichineeʾding ("White Rock Base village"), Toodjilhbiiʾ ("Cahto Valley/Winchester Flat"), Toodjilhbiiʾ ("2nd Cahto Valley village"), Toodjilhkwʾit ("Cahto Hilltop"), Tsʾisnoiʾchineeʾding ("Mountain Base village")
- Tootagit-kiiyaahaangn or Between Water band: village Tootagit ("Redemeyer Rancheria Flat village")
- Yeehliinding-kiiyaahaangn or Flows In Place band, also Slide band: village Dindai-ntceeʾtcding ("Bad Flint Place village"), Kʾaiʾkwot ("Peterson Creek"), K'ai'kwotKʾaiʾtc-chiiʾ ("Peterson Creek mouth village"), Kʾashtaahchiiʾ ("Grub Creek Mouth village"), Kʾashtaahkwot ("Grub Creek"), Lheetcghaaʾchineeʾding ("Moss Base Village"), Neeʾlhitchowbiiʾ ("Big Smoky Ground valley"), Seenaatʾai-uuyeeh ("Under the Upright Stone village"), Seeninding ("2nd Rock Hillside place"), See-Uuyeeh ("Rock Shelter village"), Tagittlʾohding ("Peterson Creek Fork village"), Tlʾohchowsʾaankwot ("Bunchgrass Lies Creek"), Yaachʾilhsaikwʾit ("Dry Up Into the Air hilltop"), Yeehliinding ("Flows In Place village")

== Culture ==
Traditionally, the Cahto made such articles of stone, bone, horn, wood and skin, as were commonly made in northern California. The primitive costume for both men and women was a tanned deer-skin, wrapped about the waist, and a close-fitting knitted cap, which kept in place the knot of hair at the back of the head. At a later period, the Cahto garment included a shirt made of two deer-skins, laced down the front and reaching to the knees. Both men and women generally had tattoos on their faces and the chest: designs consisted largely of upright lines, both broken and straight.

In constructing a Cahto house, a circular excavation about two feet deep was prepared, and in it, at the corners of a square were erected four forked posts. The front pair were a little taller than the other, so that the roof would have a slight pitch to the rear. The roof was so small that it was of much less importance in determining the final shape of the house than was the circularity of the base. The space between the posts were stuffed with bunches of long grasses, and slabs of wood and bark. An opening in the roof served to carry off smoke, and the doorway was a narrow opening in front from ground to roof. As many as three families occupied one of these little houses, with all persons cooking at the same fire. For summer camps, brush lean-tos were set up. The dog was the only domesticated animal.

A favorite pastime for the females was to assemble early in the evening for singing in chorus. One of the best singers would lead, and two others kept time by striking one bone with another. The men took no part but hung around and listened.

=== Social organization ===
Each village had its chief, dog sled, and some villages, a second chief. Generally, the chief’s son succeeded to the office, but if a headman died without sons, the people, by common consent and without formal voting, selected from among themselves the man whom they regarded as best fitted for the place. The duty of a chief was to be the adviser of his people. When anything of great importance was to be decided, the village chief summoned the council, which comprised all the elder men. Each expressed his opinion, and the chief would go along with the consensus.

=== Social practices ===
Many of the social practices of the Cahto tribe show how strongly they were influenced by the culture of northern-central California.

Children of both sexes were required to observe certain rites at the age of puberty. Annually in midsummer, a group of boys, ranging from 12 to perhaps 16 years old, were led out to a solitary place by two men, one of whom was the teacher. Here, they received instructions in mythology and the supposed origin of customs, such as the mortuary rites, shamanistic practices and puberty observances. In the winter, these boys assembled again in the ceremonial house and remained there during the four winter months for instructions on tribal folklore.

At puberty, a girl began to live a very quiet and abstemious life for five months, remaining always in or near the house, abstaining from meat, and drinking little water. She was not permitted to work, lest she catch a cold.

Marriage was arranged between the two persons concerned, without consulting anybody else. Having secured a girl’s consent, her lover would sleep with her clandestinely at night, and at dawn steal away. The secret was preserved as long as possible, perhaps for several days, and the news of the match transpired without formal announcement, even to the girl’s parents, who would learn of their daughter’s marriage in this same, indirect fashion. His marriage no longer a secret, the young man might erect a house of his own.

The bond was as easily loosened, for either could leave the other for any reason, the man retaining any male children and the woman the female children. Children were not regarded as belonging any more to the paternal than to the maternal side. When adultery was discovered, the only result was a little bickering and perhaps an invitation to the offender to take up permanent relations with the new love.

=== Funerals ===
In preparation for burial, a corpse was washed, clothed in good garments, and wrapped in deer skins. A pit was excavated on a dry hillside. The bottom was laid with a floor of poles, covered with bark and several deer skins. On this was deposited the corpse, which was covered with bark before the attendees covered it with earth.

The entire population accompanied the bearers to the grave and wailed loudly. Women, and occasionally men, cut their hair short as a symbol of grief. For persons of prominence, a mourning ceremony would be held in the year following their death. This ceremony marked the end of the mourning period, and those who had hitherto wept became immediately cheerful and smiling.

=== Religion ===
The religious conceptions of the Kato tribe are grouped around two deities: Chʾeeneesh (Chénĕśh or T'cenes), the creator, who is identified with thunder and lightning, and his companion, Naaghaichow (Nághai-cho or Nagaicho), the Great Traveler. The latter is a somewhat mischievous personage, who in the myth, constantly urges Chʾeeneesh to acts of creation, while pretending that he has the knowledge and power to perform them, if only he has the desire to do so.

In mythology, as in other phases of their culture, the Kato tribe showed their susceptibility to the double influence to which they had been exposed. With a creation story of the type prevailing in central California, they preceded it with an account of a race of animal-people who were swept from the earth by the deluge — a theme characteristic of North Pacific Coast mythology.

The creator, Chʾeeneesh, who is identified with lightning, dwelt in the sky. Below was an expanse of water, with a rim of land in the north. With his companion, Nághai-cho, he descended and turned a monstrous deer into land. Chʾeeneesh created the people, but Naaghaichow made the mountains and the streams. In everything, the latter tried to outdo Chʾeeneesh, playing the role (usually assigned to coyote) of the buffoon and trickster.

Cahto people also belonged to the Kuksu religion.

=== Shamans ===
The shamans of the Kato tribe were of three classes:

- idiiyiing, who removed, by sucking, the foreign object that caused disease;
- naachʾilhnaa, who cured illness caused by woodland creatures; and
- chʾghaalyiishn, who were not healers at all but the restored victims of the diminutive "outside people", possessing the faculty of foreseeing the future in dreams.

The idiiyiing became medicine men by instruction, not by supernatural agencies. The two other classes acquired their power solely through dreams. When the old men of a village deemed it advisable to have a new idiiyiing or "sucking doctor", either because of the death of some of the shamans or because of their waning power, the active and the retired shamans selected a promising young man. With his consent, they took him away from the village to a solitary place in the hills. The one who had been selected to be his instructor and "father" would pray and instruct the young man in the secrets of the medicine men.

When a medicine man was summoned, any others of that profession who happened to be nearby could come and observe. If the medicine man first called upon could not effect a cure, he would ask the assistance of another. While engaged in his work, a shaman would beseech the unnamed powers for help, naming the various mountains of the region and asking the spirits resident there to assist him. He would also call on Naaghaichow, and occasionally on Chʾeeneesh.

== Education ==
The Laytonville Ranchería is served by the Laytonville Unified School District.

== Population ==
Estimates for the pre-contact populations of most native groups in California have varied substantially. Alfred L. Kroeber put the 1770 population of the Kato at 500. Sherburne F. Cook estimated the pre-contact populations of the Kato at 1,100. James E. Myers thought the total might be 500.

== See also ==
- Cahto traditional narratives
