= Andersonia, California =

Unincorporated community in California, United States

Andersonia
- Unincorporated community
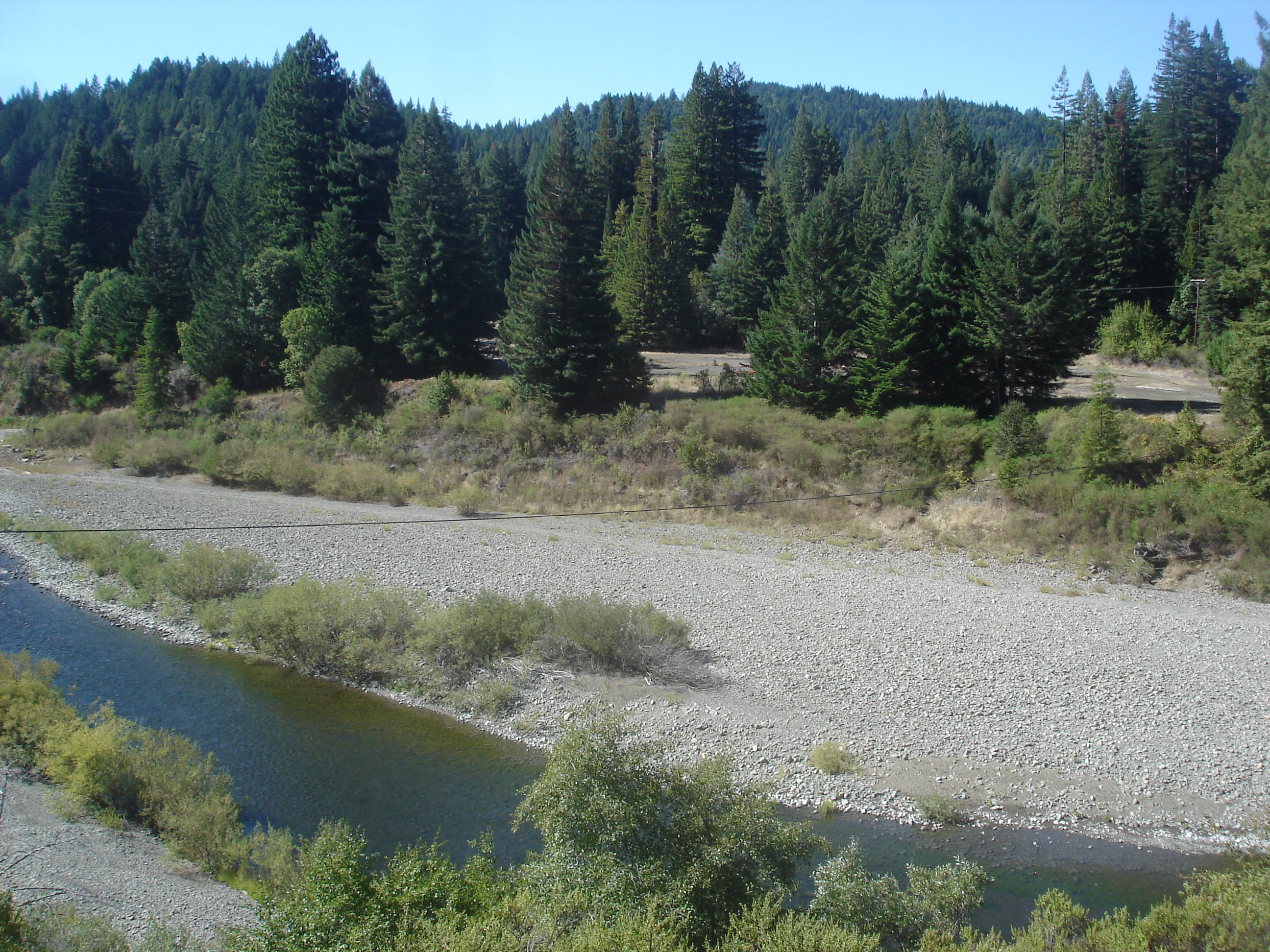
- Little remains of Andersonia at the confluence of Indian Creek and the South Fork Eel River.

- Location in California
- Coordinates: 39°58′41″N 123°48′26″W
- Country: United States
- State: California
- County: Mendocino
- Elevation: 541 ft (165 m)

Andersonia is an unincorporated community in Mendocino County, California, United States. It is located near U.S. Route 101 on the South Fork of the Eel River, 1 mile (1.6 km) north-northwest of Piercy, at an elevation of 541 feet (165 m).

== History ==
Bear Harbor and Eel River Railroad
Overview
- Headquarters: Andersonia, California
- Reporting mark: ?
- Locale: Andersonia, California
- Dates of operation: 1893–1921

Technical
- Track gauge: ?

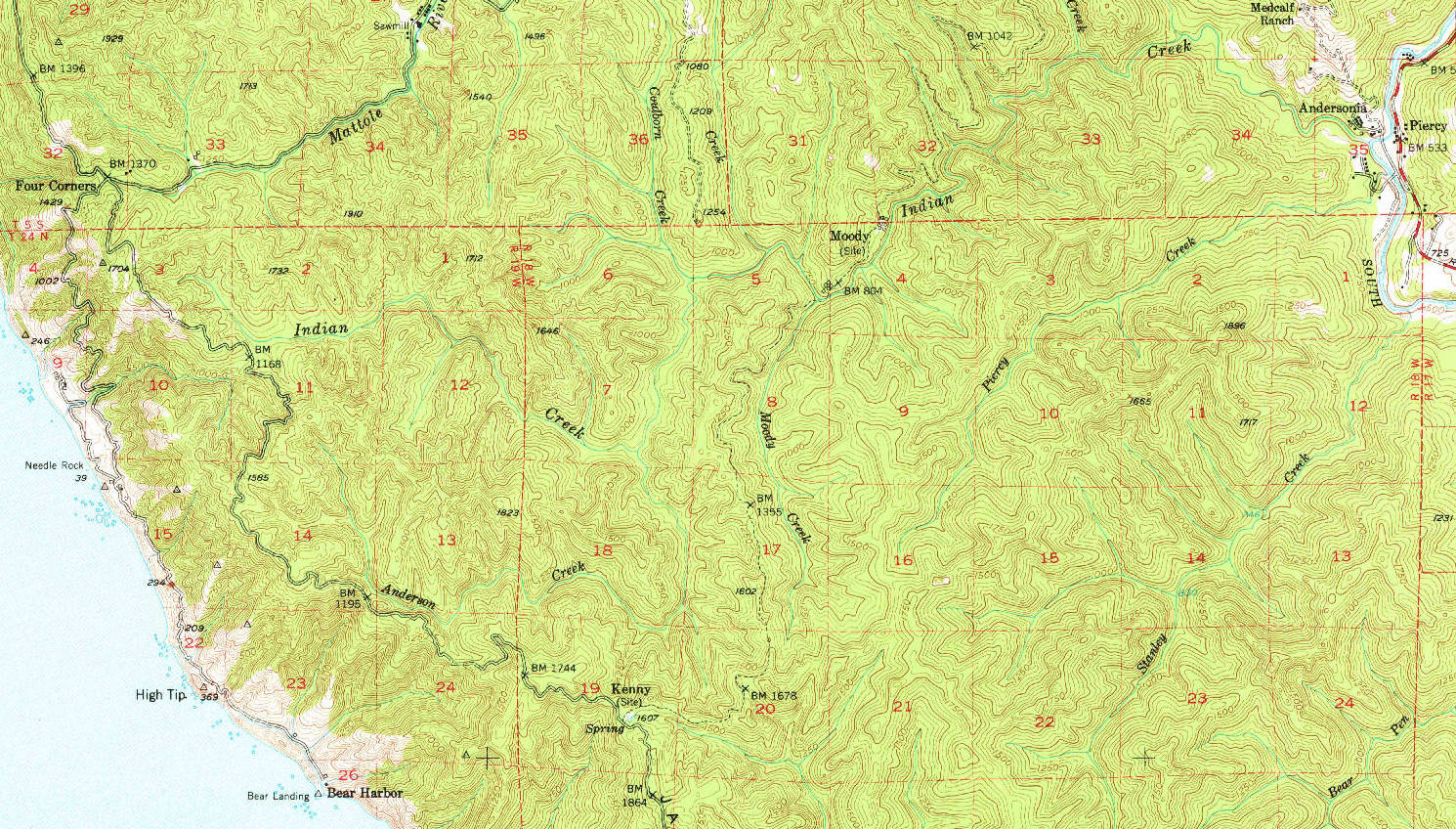
Map showing Bear Harbor, Moody, and Andersonia

A small wharf was completed at Bear Harbor in 1884 for loading of forest products from the Lost Coast. In 1893 construction commenced on the Bear Harbor and Eel River Railroad over the coastal ridge to connect Bear Harbor to South Fork Eel River tributary Indian Creek. The inland railway terminus was called Moody after Lew Moody constructed a hotel and saloon nearby.

Southern Humboldt Lumber Company camp 10 sawmill was built in 1903, and the location was named Andersonia for company president Henry Neff "Pap" Anderson. A log pond dam was constructed on Indian Creek where twenty million board feet (47,000 m^{3}) of timber were stored in preparation for milling. A 17-mile (27 km) railway extension from Moody to Andersonia was being completed in 1905.

"Pap" was killed by a mill accident on November 6, 1905. Sawmill operation was delayed by litigation following Anderson's death. Mr and Mrs Lilley stayed on as caretakers of the "ghost town"

The mill was almost sold in April 1906 to the Wright Blodgett Company of Saginaw, but the earthquake on April 18 caused the buyer to back out.

In 1921, the mill, equipment, and machinery were all dismantled for storage and the town was officially closed.

Heavy rains in 1925-6 caused the dam to burst sending the twenty-year old logs, down the Eel River.

Andersons' grandsons brought new life to the mill in 1940 with an Arcata-based "Andersonia Forest Products". The company name was briefly changed to Indian Creek Lumber Company, but by 1950, it was once again called Andersonia Forest Products and Tom Dimmick of Centralia, Washington, was brought on as the manager. Lumber was trucked out over U.S. Route 101 rather than rebuilding the railroad and wharf at Bear Harbor. The locomotives were preserved in 1962. The sawmill operated until local timber supplies were exhausted in 1972.

== Bear Harbor and Eel River Railroad Locomotives ==
Number	Builder	Type	Date	Works number	Notes
1	Marshutz and Cantrell	0-4-0 Tank locomotive	1892		purchased new; restored by the Northern Counties Logging Interpretive Association at Fort Humboldt State Historic Park
2	Baldwin Locomotive Works	2-4-2 Tank locomotive	1898		purchased new; preserved by the Northern Counties Logging Interpretive Association at Fort Humboldt State Historic Park
