= Benbow, California =

- Unincorporated community Census designated place
- Location of Benbow in Humboldt County, California.

- Location in California Benbow, California (California) Benbow, California (the United States)
- Coordinates: 40°04′07″N 123°47′04″W
- Country: United States
- State: California
- County: Humboldt County

Area
  - Total: 4.88 sq mi (12.64 km^{2})
  - Land: 4.88 sq mi (12.64 km^{2})
  - Water: 0 sq mi (0.00 km^{2}) 0%
- Elevation: 440 ft (134 m)

Population (2020)
  - Total: 422
  - Density: 86.5/sq mi (33.4/km^{2})
- Time zone: UTC-8 (Pacific)
  - Summer (DST): UTC-7 (PDT)
- Area code(s): 707, 369
- GNIS feature IDs: 1655827, 2611375

Benbow is an unincorporated community in Humboldt County, California, United States, located beside the South Fork Eel River. It is 2 miles (3.2 km) south-southeast of Garberville, at an elevation of 440 feet (134 m). Its population is 422 as of the 2020 census, up from 321 from the 2010 census. For statistical purposes, the United States Census Bureau has defined Benbow as a census-designated place (CDP).

== History ==
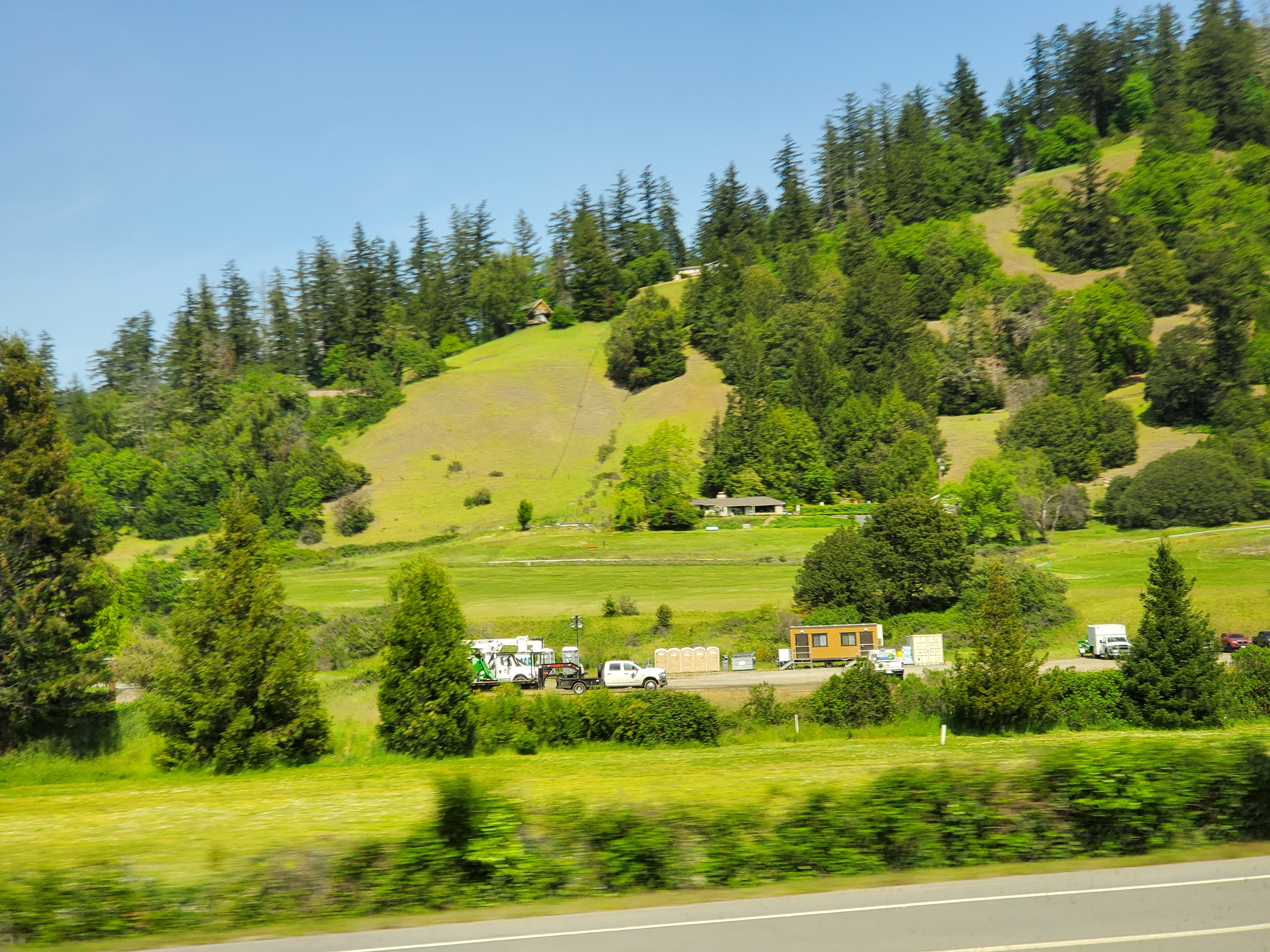
A portion of Benbow, California in 2022

The children of Arthur Benbow purchased 1,288 acres (521 ha) from Ernest Linser and also some land from John Kamper, Jack Bowden and a Mr. Peirce in 1922. It soon became apparent that ranching would not be sufficient to meet their needs so the family constructed the Benbow Inn resort hotel. In the early years the Inn was known as the Hotel Benbow and opened on July 17, 1926. The electricity for the hotel came from two diesel generators until a dam and powerhouse was completed on the south fork of the Eel River. The Tudorbethan style inn is still in operation on US Route 101 between Humboldt Bay and the San Francisco Bay Area.

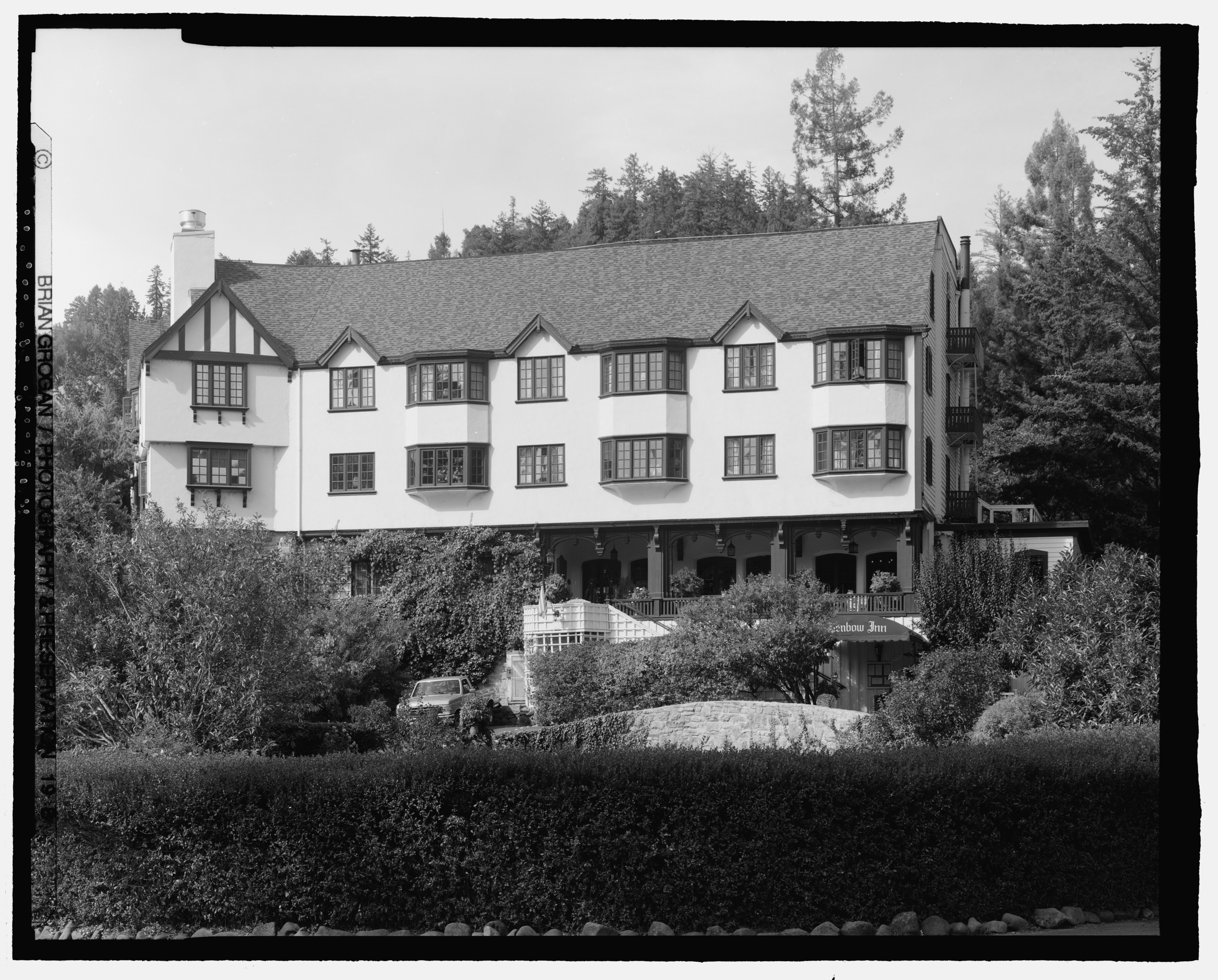
Benbow Inn, south of Garberville, Humboldt County, California, looking northwest in the year 2000

The post office was established on December 30, 1929, and operated at Benbow until it was merged with the Garberville post office on January 31, 1953.

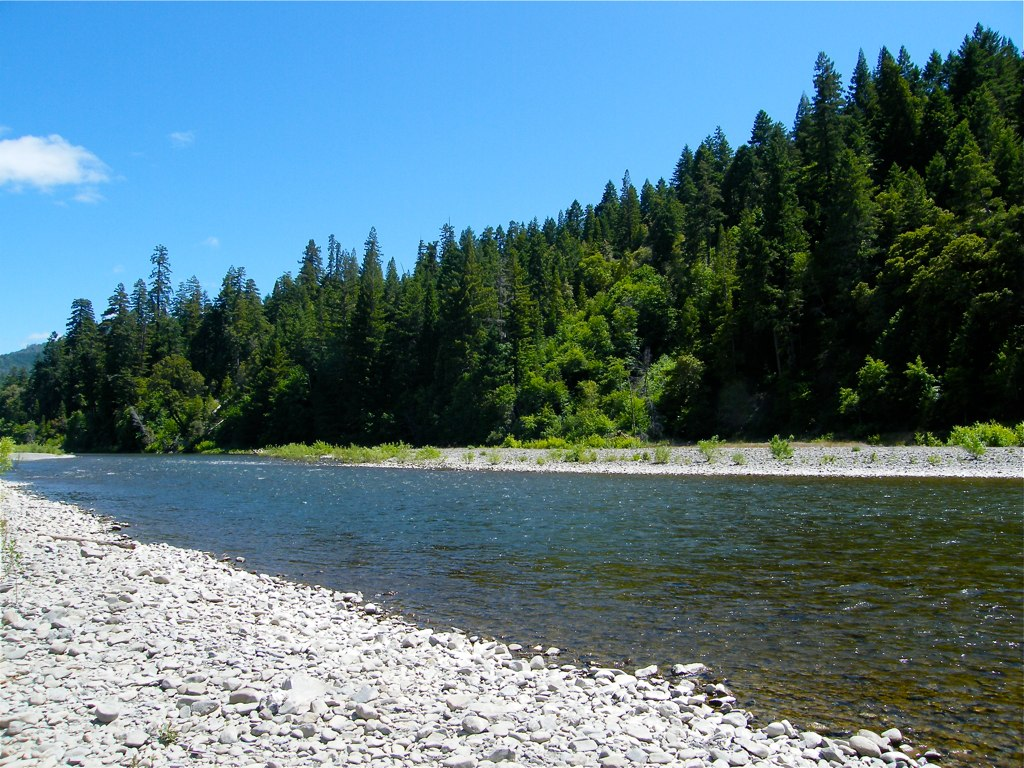
South Fork of the Eel River at Benbow Lake, Benbow Lake State Recreation Area, California, USA in 2010.

== Demographics ==
Historical population
Census	Pop.	Note	%±
2010	321		—
2020	422		31.5%
U.S. Decennial Census; 1850–1870 1880-1890; 1900 1910 1920; 1930 1940 1950; 1960 1970 1980; 1990 2000 2010

=== 2020 census ===
As of the 2020 census, Benbow had a population of 422. The population density was 86.5 inhabitants per square mile (33.4/km^{2}). 0.0% of residents lived in urban areas, while 100.0% lived in rural areas.

The median age was 41.7 years. The age distribution was 20.6% under the age of 18, 4.0% aged 18 to 24, 29.6% aged 25 to 44, 27.0% aged 45 to 64, and 18.7% who were 65 years of age or older. For every 100 females there were 102.9 males, and for every 100 females age 18 and over there were 109.4 males age 18 and over.

The census reported that 99.8% of the population lived in households, 0.2% lived in non-institutionalized group quarters, and no one was institutionalized. There were 199 households, of which 19.6% had children under the age of 18 living in them. Of all households, 35.7% were married-couple households, 13.1% were cohabiting couple households, 26.1% were households with a male householder and no spouse or partner present, and 25.1% were households with a female householder and no spouse or partner present. About 38.7% of all households were made up of individuals and 13.1% had someone living alone who was 65 years of age or older. The average household size was 2.12. There were 99 families (49.7% of all households).

There were 229 housing units at an average density of 46.9 units per square mile (18.1 units/km^{2}), of which 13.1% were vacant. The homeowner vacancy rate was 0.0% and the rental vacancy rate was 1.2%. Of the 199 occupied units, 59.3% were owner-occupied and 40.7% were renter-occupied.

Racial composition as of the 2020 census
Race	Number	Percent
White	343	81.3%
Black or African American	10	2.4%
American Indian and Alaska Native	5	1.2%
Asian	5	1.2%
Native Hawaiian and Other Pacific Islander	0	0.0%
Some other race	17	4.0%
Two or more races	42	10.0%
Hispanic or Latino (of any race)	48	11.4%

=== 2010 census ===
Benbow first appeared as a census designated place in the 2010 U.S. census.

== Government ==
=== State and federal ===
In the state legislature, Benbow is in the 2nd senatorial district, represented by Democrat Mike McGuire, and the 2nd Assembly district, represented by Democrat Chris Rogers.

Federally, it is in California's 2nd congressional district, represented by Democrat Jared Huffman.
