= Laytonville, California =

Laytonville Tintaahding (Kato)
- Census-designated place
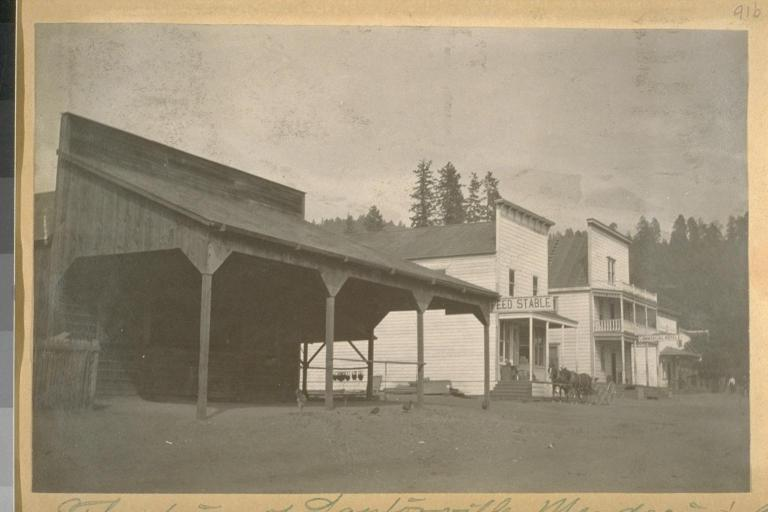
- Laytonville in 1910

- Location in Mendocino County and the state of California

- Location in the United States
- Coordinates: 39°41′18″N 123°28′58″W
- Country: United States
- State: California
- County: Mendocino

Area
  - Total: 5.433 sq mi (14.07 km^{2})
  - Land: 5.370 sq mi (13.91 km^{2})
  - Water: 0.063 sq mi (0.16 km^{2}) 1.16%
- Elevation: 1,670 ft (509 m)

Population (2020)
  - Total: 1,152
  - Density: 214.5/sq mi (82.8/km^{2})
- Time zone: UTC-8 (Pacific (PST))
  - Summer (DST): UTC-7 (PDT)
- ZIP codes: 95417, 95454
- Area code: 707
- FIPS code: 06-40928
- GNIS feature ID: 1658951

Laytonville (Kato: Tintaahding) is a census-designated place (CDP) in Mendocino County, California, United States. It is located 23 miles (37 km) north-northwest of Willits, at an elevation of 1,670 feet (510 m). The population was 1,152 at the 2020 census, down from 1,227 at the 2010 census.

== Geography ==
Laytonville is located in northern Mendocino County at 39°41′18″N 123°28′58″W. It is in the Long Valley, drained to the north by Tenmile Creek, a tributary of the South Fork of the Eel River. The headwaters of the South Fork are 5 miles (8 km) south of Laytonville.

U.S. Route 101 passes through the center of town, leading south through Willits 45 miles (72 km) to Ukiah, the Mendocino county seat, and northwest 22 miles (35 km) to Leggett.

According to the United States Census Bureau, the Laytonville CDP has a total area of 5.4 square miles (14 km^{2}), of which 0.06 square miles (0.16 km^{2}), or 1.16%, are water.

== History ==
The Cahto Native Americans lived in the region that would eventually become Cahto, California and Laytonville prior to Europeans settling in the area. They referred to nearby Cahto Mountain as "Signal Peak," as it was used to send and receive smoke signals between local native groups.

Laytonville was founded by Nova Scotian Frank B. Layton, who in 1874 built a blacksmithy and house at the site. Layton had previously attempted to set up his blacksmith business in Cahto, but was forced to relocate after an altercation with the local authorities. The first Laytonville post office opened in 1879.

In 1885 a road was opened between Laytonville and Covelo, California, and a bridge over the Eel River was constructed in 1892. These additions caused winter travel to flow through Laytonville which increased the town's popularity and business.

The town suffered two devastating fires in 1904 and 1907, resulting in the loss of several businesses, including three hotels, a store, and the telephone office.

== Demographics ==
Historical population
Census	Pop.	Note	%±
1980	1,096		—
1990	1,133		3.4%
2000	1,301		14.8%
2010	1,227		−5.7%
2020	1,152		−6.1%
US Census U.S Census 1880–1980,

=== 2020 census ===
As of the 2020 census, Laytonville had a population of 1,152. The population density was 214.5 inhabitants per square mile (82.8/km^{2}), and the median age was 42.0 years. The age distribution was 225 people (19.5%) under the age of 18, 82 people (7.1%) aged 18 to 24, 312 people (27.1%) aged 25 to 44, 314 people (27.3%) aged 45 to 64, and 219 people (19.0%) who were 65 years of age or older. For every 100 females, there were 119.4 males, and for every 100 females age 18 and over, there were 112.6 males age 18 and over.

The whole population lived in households. There were 464 households, out of which 117 (25.2%) had children under the age of 18 living in them, 155 (33.4%) were married-couple households, 51 (11.0%) were cohabiting couple households, 117 (25.2%) had a female householder with no spouse or partner present, and 141 (30.4%) had a male householder with no spouse or partner present. 157 households (33.8%) were one person, and 72 (15.5%) were one person aged 65 or older. The average household size was 2.48. There were 267 families (57.5% of all households).

0.0% of residents lived in urban areas, while 100.0% lived in rural areas.

There were 508 housing units at an average density of 94.6 units per square mile (36.5 units/km^{2}), of which 464 (91.3%) were occupied. Of these, 301 (64.9%) were owner-occupied, and 163 (35.1%) were occupied by renters. There were 44 vacant housing units (8.7%); the homeowner vacancy rate was 2.0% and the rental vacancy rate was 1.2%.

Racial composition as of the 2020 census
Race	Number	Percent
White	750	65.1%
Black or African American	6	0.5%
American Indian and Alaska Native	172	14.9%
Asian	18	1.6%
Native Hawaiian and Other Pacific Islander	0	0.0%
Some other race	73	6.3%
Two or more races	133	11.5%
Hispanic or Latino (of any race)	146	12.7%

=== Income and poverty ===
In 2023, the US Census Bureau estimated that the median household income was $35,798, and the per capita income was $21,716. About 14.6% of families and 21.9% of the population were below the poverty line.

=== 2010 census ===
The 2010 United States census reported that Laytonville had a population of 1,227 at that time. The population density was 225.8 inhabitants per square mile (87.2/km^{2}). The racial makeup of Laytonville was 839 (68.4%) White, 16 (1.3%) African American, 244 (19.9%) Native American, 10 (0.8%) Asian, 1 (0.1%) Pacific Islander, 60 (4.9%) from other races, and 57 (4.6%) from two or more races. Hispanic or Latino of any race were 141 persons (11.5%).

The Census reported that 1,226 people (99.9% of the population) lived in households, 1 (0.1%) lived in non-institutionalized group quarters, and 0 (0%) were institutionalized.

There were 493 households, out of which 163 (33.1%) had children under the age of 18 living in them, 166 (33.7%) were opposite-sex married couples living together, 82 (16.6%) had a female householder with no husband present, 48 (9.7%) had a male householder with no wife present. There were 59 (12.0%) unmarried opposite-sex partnerships, and 8 (1.6%) same-sex married couples or partnerships. 146 households (29.6%) were made up of individuals, and 37 (7.5%) had someone living alone who was 65 years of age or older. The average household size was 2.49. There were 296 families (60.0% of all households); the average family size was 3.04.

The population age distribution is 271 people (22.1%) under the age of 18, 96 people (7.8%) aged 18 to 24, 326 people (26.6%) aged 25 to 44, 384 people (31.3%) aged 45 to 64, and 150 people (12.2%) who were 65 years of age or older. The median age was 40.0 years. For every 100 females, there were 108.3 males. For every 100 females age 18 and over, there were 104.7 males.

There were 562 housing units at a reported average density of 103.4 per square mile (39.9/km^{2}). Of these 562 housing units in the Laytonville area, 270 (54.8%) were owner-occupied, and 223 (45.2%) were occupied by renters. The homeowner vacancy rate was 1.1%; the rental vacancy rate was 9.7%. 640 people (52.2% of the population) lived in owner-occupied housing units and 586 people (47.8%) lived in rental housing units.

== Transportation ==
The Amtrak Thruway 7 bus provides daily connections to/from Laytonville (with a curbside stop at 44900 Highway 101), Martinez to the south, and Arcata to the north. Additional Amtrak connections are available from Martinez station.

== Politics ==
In the state legislature, Laytonville is in the 2nd senatorial district, represented by Democrat Mike McGuire, and the 2nd Assembly district, represented by Democrat Chris Rogers.

Federally, Laytonville is in California's 2nd congressional district, represented by Democrat Jared Huffman.

== Notable people ==
- Anna M. Morrison Reed (1849/50-1921), poet, lecturer, suffragist, editor/publisher of a newspaper and a magazine

== See also ==
- Hog Farm, a Laytonville organization considered to be America's longest-running hippie commune
