= Sequoia County, California =

Proposed county in California, United States

Coordinates: 40.104°N 123.733°W

Sequoia County was a proposal in the early 1990s, to create a new county out of parts of southern Humboldt and northern Mendocino counties in California. The 1992 proposal supporters halted signature gathering due to low support. The proponents of the proposal, restarted in 1993, submitted signatures in January 1994 to the Humboldt County clerk, who validated 2,033 signatures, 169 short of the necessary number to qualify for possible inclusion on the 1996 ballot.

== History ==
The new county was first proposed in 1992 by Alderpoint resident Lee Ann Barton from her class project at the College of the Redwoods extension in Redway, then under the name Salmon County. The proponents wanted "better representation and services," including law enforcement, and said they wanted their taxes to stay local. The petition to create Sequoia County, in the heart of a region best known for the cultivation of marijuana and the namesake redwoods, that would have united two-thirds of the Emerald Triangle into one county, intentionally restarted their petition on April 20, 1993. Part of the impetus for proposing a new county was to have more control over law enforcement, specifically the enforcement of marijuana cultivation laws by Mendocino and Humboldt sheriffs and drug task forces, as well as the Campaign Against Marijuana Planting.

== Area and population ==
The proposed county would have been 2,313 square miles, taking around a third of the land of Humboldt and Mendocino counties. The would-be county's population at the time of the 1990 Census would have been about 15,600. The southern boundary would have followed the South Fork Ten Mile Creek, Lake Ridge, Sherwood Peak, and a straight light from the intersection of Highway 101 and Sherwood Road, Mount Sanhedrin and Hull Mountain to the Lake County border. The northern border would have started at the mouth of the Bear River, followed Bear River Ridge to Monument Ridge, crossed Highway 101 at Shively Road, crossed Highway 36 just east of Carlotta, connected with the Mad River east of Iaqua Buttes and followed the Mad River to the Trinity County border. Humboldt County would have notably lost Reggae on the River, Benbow Inn, Humboldt Redwoods State Park, Avenue of the Giants, Richardson Grove State Park, and King Range National Conservation Area, while Mendocino County would have lost Confusion Hill, Drive Thru Tree, Standish-Hickey State Recreation Area, Sinkyone Wilderness State Park, and the majority of the Lost Coast region.

== Places within proposed county ==
Humboldt census-designated places

- Alderpoint
- Benbow
- Garberville
- Miranda
- Myers Flat
- Phillipsville
- Redcrest
- Redway
- Shelter Cove
- Weott

Mendocino census-designated places

- Covelo
- Laytonville
- Leggett

Humboldt unincorporated communities

- Blocksburg
- Briceland
- Bridgeville
- Cooks Valley
- Dinsmore
- Dyerville
- Englewood
- Fort Seward
- Fruitland
- Holmes
- Honeydew
- Pepperwood
- Petrolia
- Riverside Park
- Shively
- Stafford
- Whitethorn

Mendocino unincorporated communities

- Branscomb
- Dos Rios
- Longvale
- Navarro
- Piercy
- Rockport
- Spyrock
- South Leggett
- Twin Rocks
- Westport

Indian reservations

- Round Valley Indian Reservation

== Emerald City ==
In 2011, some of the proponents of the failed bid to create Sequoia County, started a new bid to incorporate a city in southern Humboldt County and call it Emerald City. Early proposals were to incorporate Garberville, with a population of 913, and Redway, with a population of 1,225, into one new city. The proponents' main objectives were to have more control of local law enforcement and tax their lucrative marijuana industry. Emerald City never made it past the early stages of proposal.

== See also ==
- Campaign Against Marijuana Planting
- Emerald Triangle
- Lost Coast
