= 1955 Yuba–Sutter floods =

1955 flood in California, U.S.

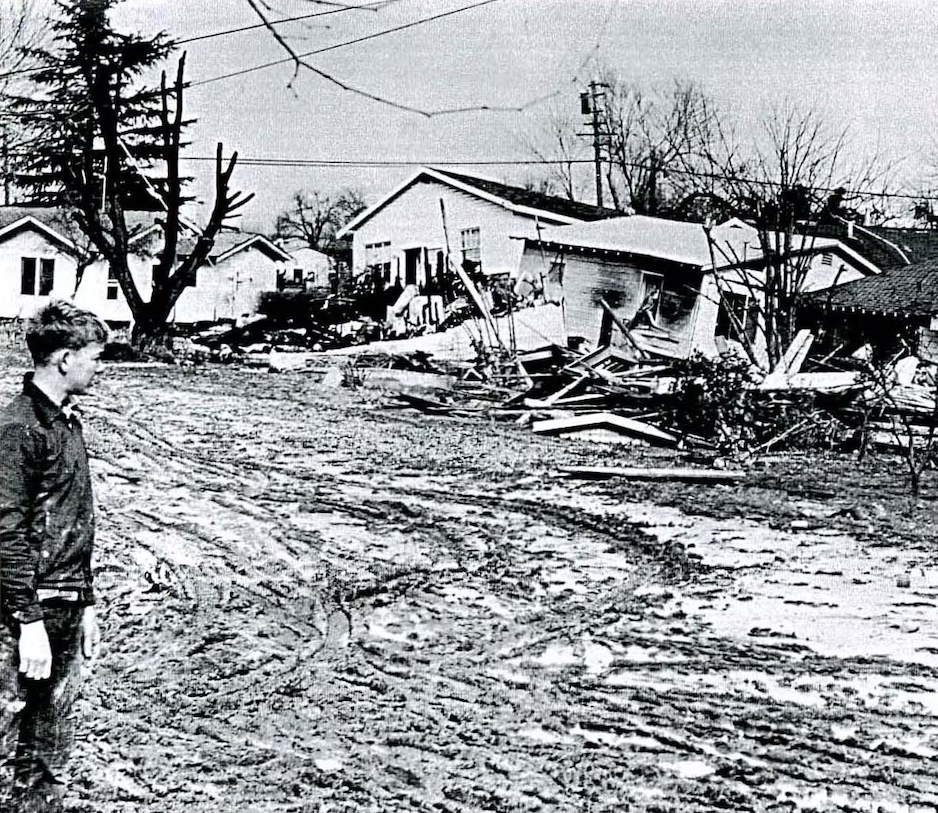
- A destroyed home in Yuba City following the floods
- Date: December 16–25, 1955
- Location: North and Central California
- Cause: Levee failure and heavy rain
- Deaths: 74 deaths, >4,325 injuries
- Property damage: >$150 million (1955 USD)

From December 16 to 25, 1955, devastating flooding struck portions of California. It was caused by heavy rainfall and a levee break on the Feather River, and directly resulted in the deaths of 74 people, leaving damages of an estimated $150 million (1955 USD), one of the costliest floods ever recorded in California. The floods are commonly known as the Yuba–Sutter floods as there was extensive damage in Yuba and Sutter counties.

The floods were described as "the worst in the history of northern California"; thousands of people were forced to evacuate. They have been compared to those of 1986 and 1997. Recovery and rescue efforts were widespread with over 2,000 volunteers working to help repair leaking levees and helicopters transporting residents away from flooded areas, notably Yuba City.

== Cause ==
In the first two weeks of December, a flow pattern over portions of north California was in a west to northwest direction, which let multiple storm systems move through coastal areas. These storms, while relatively weak, helped soak soil and fill streams, which directly contributed to flooding at the end of the month. Hydraulic mining was also noted as a potential cause for the eventual flood; mining eroded hillsides and shifted normal waterways. Additionally, an ineffective system of levees located in the Shanghai Bend area directly contributed to the floods. Due to geography of the area, several large floods have impacted the region in the 50 years before and after the 1955 floods.

== Flooding ==
The floods were initially triggered by very heavy rainfall across California; 15.3 inches (39 cm) of rainfall were recorded in Shasta County on December 20. In Humboldt County, the communities of Dyerville and Elinor were destroyed. On December 22, the city of Santa Cruz was hit by the highest level of flooding ever recorded in the area; three people were killed during flooding in the city. The town of Weott, located at the south fork of the Eel River, also sustained heavy damage. The crest of the flood was just under 43 feet (13 m).

Near Scotia, the Eel River broke its previous discharge flow record set in December 1937. In Klamath, flood waters reportedly reached as high as 18 feet (5.5 m) as the Klamath River broke its discharge record. Several other rivers and small streams also broke previously set discharge and flow records. Several small communities along the Eel River, including Pepperwood, California, were heavily damaged or completely wiped out by the floods. More than 1,000 people evacuated the city of Palo Alto as the San Francisquito Creek overflowed.

=== Yuba City ===
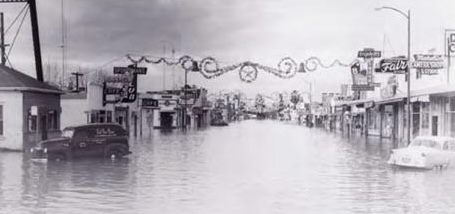
The flooding, seen from a city street

Yuba City, California, located in the Sutter Basin, was heavily damaged by the flooding. 90% of the city was flooded by high waters. 600 people were rescued via helicopter but 37 to 38 residents drowned during the event. The flooding in Yuba City was caused by the Feather River breaking through a levee south of Marysville. More than 4,325 people in city limits were injured, and thousands of homes were destroyed by high waters. One helicopter carried over 100 residents caught in the flood to safety as homes were knocked off their foundations and a 20 feet (6.1 m)-high wall of water moved through the southern side of the city.

Although flood waters never reached Marysville, they came within feet of flooding the city.

== Aftermath ==
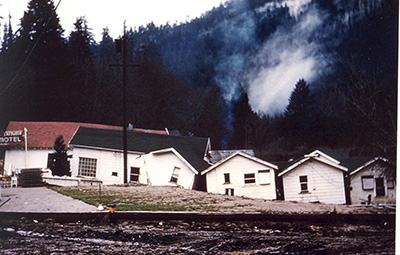
Damaged residences in Weott

Images of flooding made the front page of The New York Times and other national newspapers on December 25. Thousands of volunteers patrolled the streets of Yuba City and airmen from the Beale Air Force Base helped to repair the leaking levee. Bill Young, a former mayor of the city, stated on the volunteer work that "15-year-old boys became men, and some men became boys". Large portions of the city's infrastructure were wiped out by the floods, including a railroad bridge and the Fifth Street Bridge. According to Sutter County spokesperson Chuck Smith, entertainer Walt Disney saw a newsreel of the flood and sent "Mouseketeer" Annette Funicello to the Yuba City High School to dance for children affected by the flood; the event was part of a larger Christmas celebration that was held February 1956 due to many children missing Christmas in temporary shelters.

In 1959, the Yuba Water Agency was formed to prevent any future catastrophic floods from occurring. In 1961, residents of Yuba County voted to implement $185 million (1961 USD) in revenue bonds, which was used to fund the construction of three dams under the Yuba River Development Project.

The same year, several rounds of litigation and court cases took place in the Superior Court of Sutter County against the State of California Pacific Gas and Electric Company and North American weather consultants. The cases were largely brought forth by property owners who sought compensation for the levee breaks. In 1964, a judge ruled in favor of the companies, determining that neither could be considered liable for the levee failures. In 2013, as a result of the flooding, improvements began on a 44 miles (71 km) stretch of levees that lined the Feather River, where the flood occurred. The project, which costed an estimated $312 million (2013 USD) brought the levees to national safety standards and were made to withstand "catastrophic" flooding along the river.

In 2025, an exhibit at the Sutter County Museum was opened; the exhibit details the history of flooding in Yuba and Sutter counties, including the 1955 flood.

== See also ==
- List of California floods

- 1997 California New Years Floods, another deadly winter flood in 1996
- Christmas flood of 1964, a deadly California flood on Christmas 1964
