= Shively, California =

Unincorporated community in California, United States

Shively
- Unincorporated community
- Location in California Shively (the United States)
- Coordinates: 40°25′50″N 123°58′11″W
- Country: United States
- State: California
- County: Humboldt
- Elevation: 144 ft (44 m)

Shively (formerly Shiveley, Bluff Prairie, and Paradise) is an unincorporated community in Humboldt County, California, United States. It is located 2.25 miles (3.6 km) north-northwest of Redcrest, at an elevation of 144 feet (44 m), on the right bank of the Eel River.

A post office operated at Shively from 1906 to 1965.

Like neighboring Pepperwood, Shively was once a center for farm produce including corn, cucumbers, and tomatoes. Also in common with Pepperwood, it was mostly destroyed in the Christmas flood of 1964. A few farms and residences remain today.

== See also ==
- Northwestern Pacific Railroad
