= Christmas flood of 1964 =

Major flood in the United States

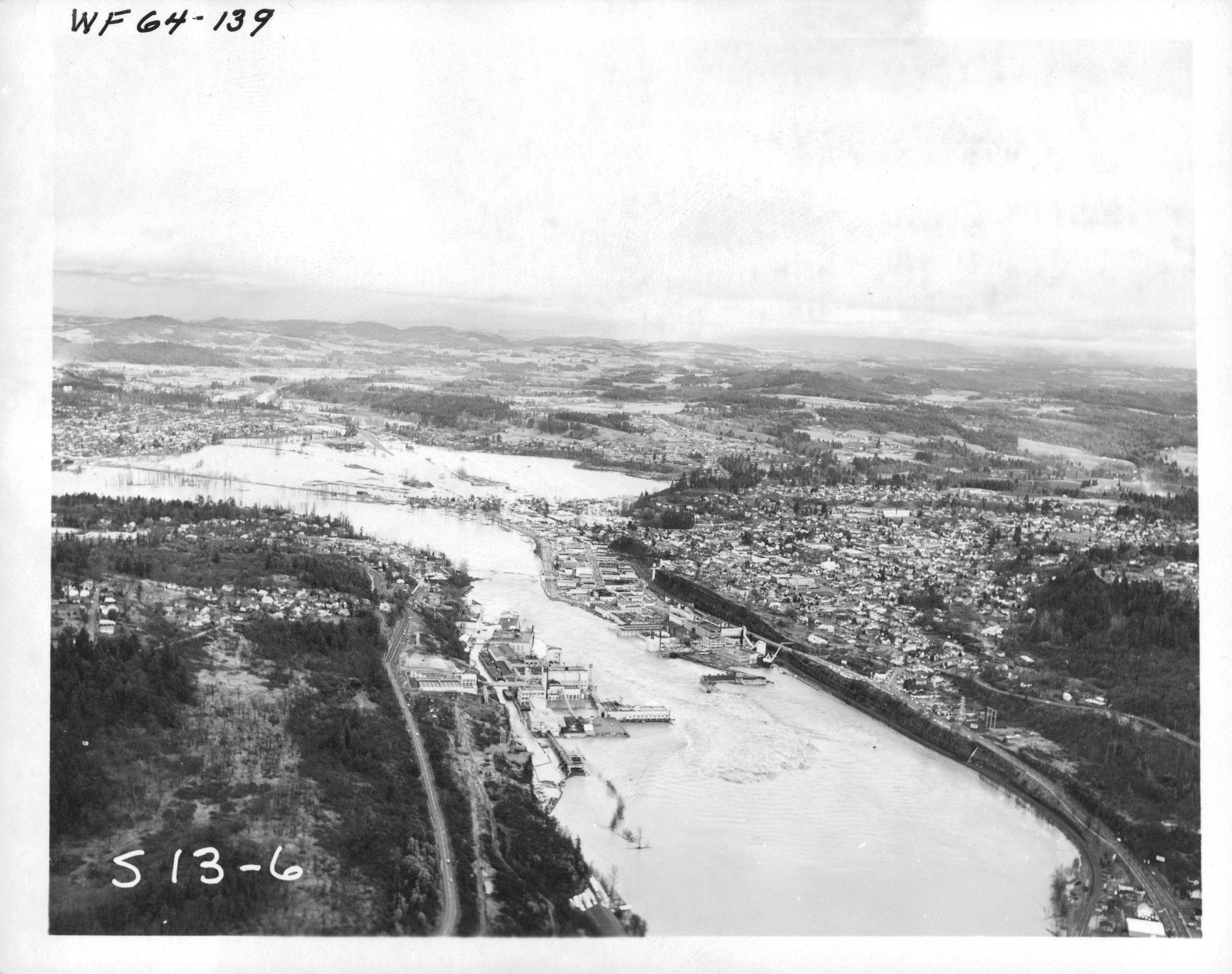
- An aerial view of the flood, showing Willamette Falls and Oregon City
- Date: 20 days December 18, 1964 – January 7, 1965
- Location: California, Oregon, and Washington states

The Christmas flood of 1964 was a major flood in the United States' Pacific Northwest and parts of Northern California between December 18, 1964, and January 7, 1965, spanning the Christmas holiday.

Considered a 100-year flood, it was the worst flood in recorded history on nearly every major stream and river in coastal Northern California and one of the worst to affect the Willamette River in Oregon. It also affected parts of southwest Washington, Idaho, and Nevada.

In Oregon, 17 or 18 people died as a result of the disaster, and it caused hundreds of millions of dollars in damage. The flooding on the Willamette covered 152,789 acres (61,831.5 ha). The National Weather Service rated the flood as the fifth most destructive weather event in Oregon in the 20th century.

California Governor Pat Brown was quoted as saying that a flood of similar proportions could "happen only once in 1,000 years," and it was often referred to later as the Thousand Year Flood. The flood killed 19 people, heavily damaged or completely devastated at least 10 towns, destroyed all or portions of more than 20 major highway and county bridges, carried away millions of board feet of lumber and logs from mill sites, devastated thousands of acres of agricultural land, killed 4,000 head of livestock, and caused $100 million in damage in Humboldt County, California, alone.

== History ==
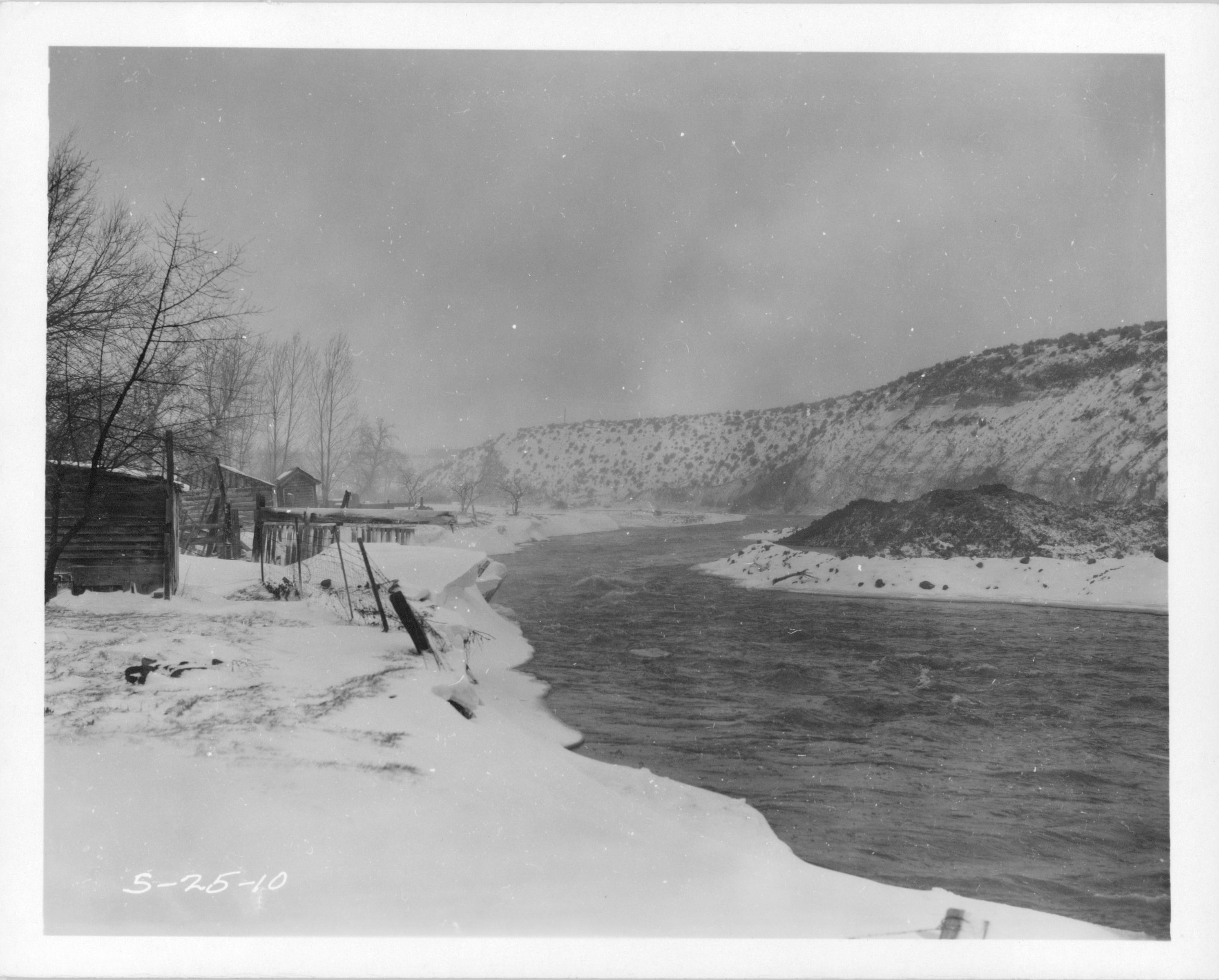
The freeze of December 1964 that occurred before the flood

An atypical cold spell began in Oregon on December 13, 1964, that froze the soil, and it was followed by unusually heavy snow. Subsequently, an atmospheric river brought persistent, heavy, warm rain. The temperature increased by 30 to 40 °F (17 to 22 °C). This melted the snow, but left the soil frozen and impermeable. Some places received the equivalent of a year's rain in just a few days. Albany, Oregon, received 13 inches (330 mm) of rain in December, almost double its average December rainfall of 7 inches (200 mm). Detroit, Oregon recorded an extra 18 inches (460 mm) of rain, and at Crater Lake, where the average normal December rainfall is 12 inches (300 mm), there was over 38 inches (970 mm) of rain. As rivers and streams overflowed and the soil became saturated, mudslides occurred, roads closed, and reservoirs overflowed. Many towns were isolated. By the end of the flood, every river in Oregon was above flood stage, and more than 30 major bridges were impassable.

=== Late January ===
Heavy warm rain and melting snow caused more flooding in late January 1965, after the waters had begun to recede from the December flood. More mudslides occurred in places that had withstood the December flooding, and there were more deaths. Many streams in the northern San Joaquin Valley reached higher flows than they had in December.

== Effects and aftermath ==
=== Oregon ===
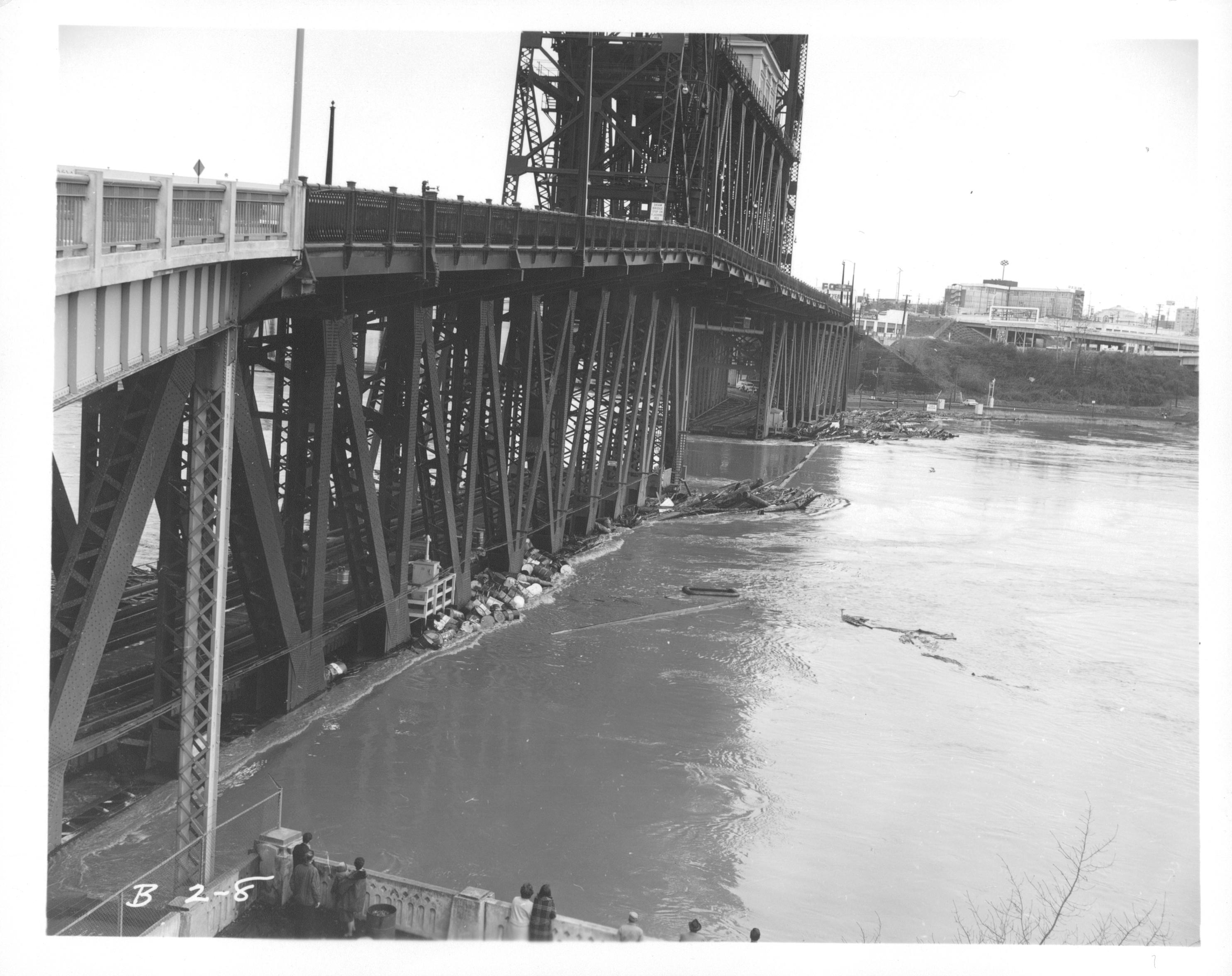
The Steel Bridge during the flood

The Christmas flood of 1964 was "the most severe rainstorm to ever occur over central Oregon, and among the most severe over western Oregon since the late 1870s", according to the National Weather Service office in Portland.

Some of the worst mudslides occurred in the Mount Hood Corridor, and one man died in a mud and debris avalanche near Rhododendron that destroyed 15 houses. Other deaths occurred from drowning and electrocution, and one man died when the new John Day bridge collapsed.

Yamhill County was severely affected. The Highway 219 bridge between Newberg and St. Paul, and Wilsonville Road between Newberg and Wilsonville were closed, trapping hundreds of people.

On the Oregon Coast, downtown Reedsport was flooded with 8 feet (2.4 m) of water, and in Coos Bay, a massive logjam contributed to severe flooding. The ports at Gold Beach and Brookings were destroyed.

At Oregon City, Willamette Falls was unrecognizable as a waterfall, and the city was flooded by several feet of water. In Portland, the lower deck of the Steel Bridge was underwater and had also been hit by a log raft consisting of around 1,000 logs. The impact of the raft severely damaged the Hawthorne Bridge, closing it for a year. At 12 feet (3.7 m) above flood stage, the flooding of the Willamette River at Portland in 1964 was second only to the 1948 flood that wiped out Vanport City. At its peak, the water was at the top of Downtown Portland's seawall.

Salem Memorial Hospital (now Salem Health) had to be evacuated after waters from nearby Shelton Ditch and Mill Creek flooded the hospital's basement. Hospital staff, parks department employees, and inmates from the Oregon State Penitentiary placed sandbags around the hospital to prevent floodwaters from coming in. Eventually, the flooding coupled with a loss of power led to the decision to evacuate patients to Salem General Hospital on Center Street. 121 patients were evacuated from Salem Memorial by hospital staff, doctors, ambulance crews, and the National Guard. The hospital was able to reopen five days later after extensive work to repair the flooding damage.

The Southern Pacific (SP) rail line between Portland and San Francisco was out of service for eighteen days as crews repaired damage from landslides near the 4,885-foot (1,489 m) Cascade Summit; and the parallel Willamette Pass highway was blocked for several days. Salt Creek washed out 25 miles (40 km) of Oregon Route 58 and undermined the SP viaduct footings. Landslides covered 700 feet (210 m) of SP track near Oakridge, and swept away 130 feet (40 m) of the Noisy Creek bridge 20 miles (32 km) north of Crescent Lake. The Willamette River washed out 300 feet (91 m) of SP track between Portland and Albany.

=== California ===
Map of California showing the 34 counties declared disaster areas during the flood. The six red counties sustained more damage than the other 28 counties combined.

Starting on December 21, intense downpours across Northern California caused numerous streams to flood, many to record-breaking levels. California Governor Brown declared 34 counties in the region disaster areas. Together, Del Norte, Humboldt, Mendocino, Siskiyou, Trinity, and Sonoma counties sustained more damage than the other 28 counties combined. Twenty-six U.S. Geological Survey (USGS) stream gauges were destroyed.

==== North Coast ====
The Eel, Smith, Klamath, Trinity, Salmon, and Mad rivers, as well as other rivers and large streams, all went well beyond flood stage and peaked nearly simultaneously around December 21 and 22, breaking previous records (notably those set in the "hundred year" flood of 1955 in most cases). Sixteen state highway bridges were destroyed in California's 1st congressional district, most of them on Highway 101, and another ten county bridges were destroyed in Humboldt County. The flood destroyed 37 miles (60 km) of track with multiple stream and river crossings of the Northwestern Pacific Railroad through the Eel River canyon, the region's only major railroad. The federal government ordered in military assistance, including Air Force, Army, and Navy aircraft along with the destroyer escort USS Walton and the aircraft carrier USS Bennington to ferry in both supplies and in the latter's case, much needed helicopters.

Many communities of Del Norte and Humboldt counties suffered extensive power outages and were left isolated or cut off from the rest of the state for a period, including the region's larger populated areas around Humboldt Bay, such as Eureka and Arcata, despite the fact that those cities were located on higher ground and not in the path of raging rivers. Riverside communities like Klamath, Orleans, Myers Flat, Weott, South Fork, Shively, Pepperwood, Stafford, and Ti-Bar were completely destroyed by flood waters; some of them were never rebuilt and none regained their former status. Metropolitan, Rio Dell, and Scotia were significantly damaged. The Pacific Lumber Company sawmill at Scotia lost 40 million board feet (94,000 m^{3}) of logs and lumber washed downstream. Crescent City, still recovering from the tsunami created by the 1964 Alaska earthquake only nine months earlier, also suffered from the floods.

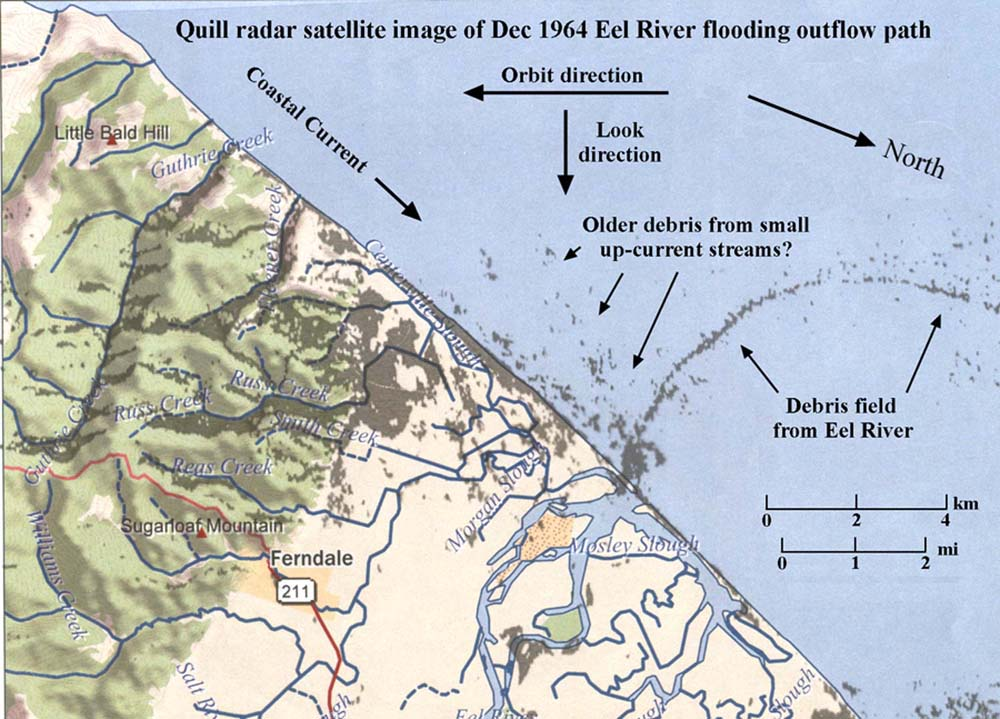
Satellite image showing extensive debris field in Pacific Ocean coming from the Eel River.

Over 22 inches (550 mm) of rain fell on the Eel River basin in a span of two days. By December 23, 752,000 cubic feet per second (21,300 m^{3}/s) of water rushed down the Eel River at Scotia (still upstream from the confluence of the Van Duzen River), 200,000 cubic feet per second (5,660 m^{3}/s) more than the 1955 flood, and more than the average discharge of the entire Mississippi River basin. Just under 200,000 cubic feet per second (5,660 m^{3}/s) of water flowed down the South Fork Eel River alone, causing severe damage along its entire length. Every stream gauge on the Eel River was destroyed except the one at Fernbridge where the bridge survived the flood. The flood crest at Miranda was 46 feet (14 m). Signs were later placed on top of tall poles to mark the unusual height of the water.

The Smith River, located in Del Norte County near the Oregon border, reached flows of 228,000 cubic feet per second (6,460 m^{3}/s) at Hiouchi, easily surpassing the 1955 flood's previous record of 165,000 cubic feet per second (4,670 m^{3}/s). The town of Gasquet received 26.6 inches (676 mm) of rain over an eight-day period, and Crescent City received 9.2 inches (230 mm).

The Klamath River reached flows of 557,000 cubic feet per second (15,800 m^{3}/s), submerging the town of Klamath under 15 feet (4.6 m) of water.

The Trinity River, one of the Klamath's largest tributaries, also flooded and wrought destruction along its length. The Trinity, however, did not break the 1955 flood's records because of the newly constructed Trinity Dam, which stored 372,200 acre-feet (459,100,000 m^{3}) of runoff from the storm. Nonetheless, 231,000 cubic feet per second (6,540 m^{3}/s) of water rushed down the river at Hoopa.

Between December 20 and December 26, 10,390,000 acre-feet (12.82 km^{3}) of water flowed into the Pacific Ocean from the combined rivers and streams on the North Coast (of California).

==== Central Valley and beyond ====
In the California Central Valley, the Yosemite Valley was flooded, and residents of Yuba City were evacuated. Many streams reached record flood stages, including the Feather River, Yuba River, American River, Cottonwood Creek, and Butte Creek. The flood caused the uncompleted Hell Hole Dam on the Rubicon River to fail, sending even more water downstream. In total, 375,000 acres (152,000 ha) of the Central Valley was flooded.

=== Elsewhere ===
In southwest Washington, rising rivers threatened Centralia and Longview–Kelso and closed Interstate 5 and all railways at flooded Kalama for over a week. In Nevada, the Truckee River threatened Reno.

== See also ==
- Great Flood of 1862
- Willamette Valley Flood of 1996
