= Redway, California =

Redway
- census-designated place
- Location in Humboldt County and the state of California
- Coordinates: 40°07′13″N 123°49′24″W
- Country: United States
- State: California
- County: Humboldt

Area
  - Total: 1.272 sq mi (3.295 km^{2})
  - Land: 1.251 sq mi (3.239 km^{2})
  - Water: 0.022 sq mi (0.056 km^{2}) 1.7%
- Elevation: 538 ft (164 m)

Population (2020)
  - Total: 1,247
  - Density: 997.1/sq mi (385.0/km^{2})
- Time zone: UTC-8 (Pacific (PST))
  - Summer (DST): UTC-7 (PDT)
- ZIP code: 95560
- Area code: 707
- FIPS code: 06-60088
- GNIS feature ID: 0277583

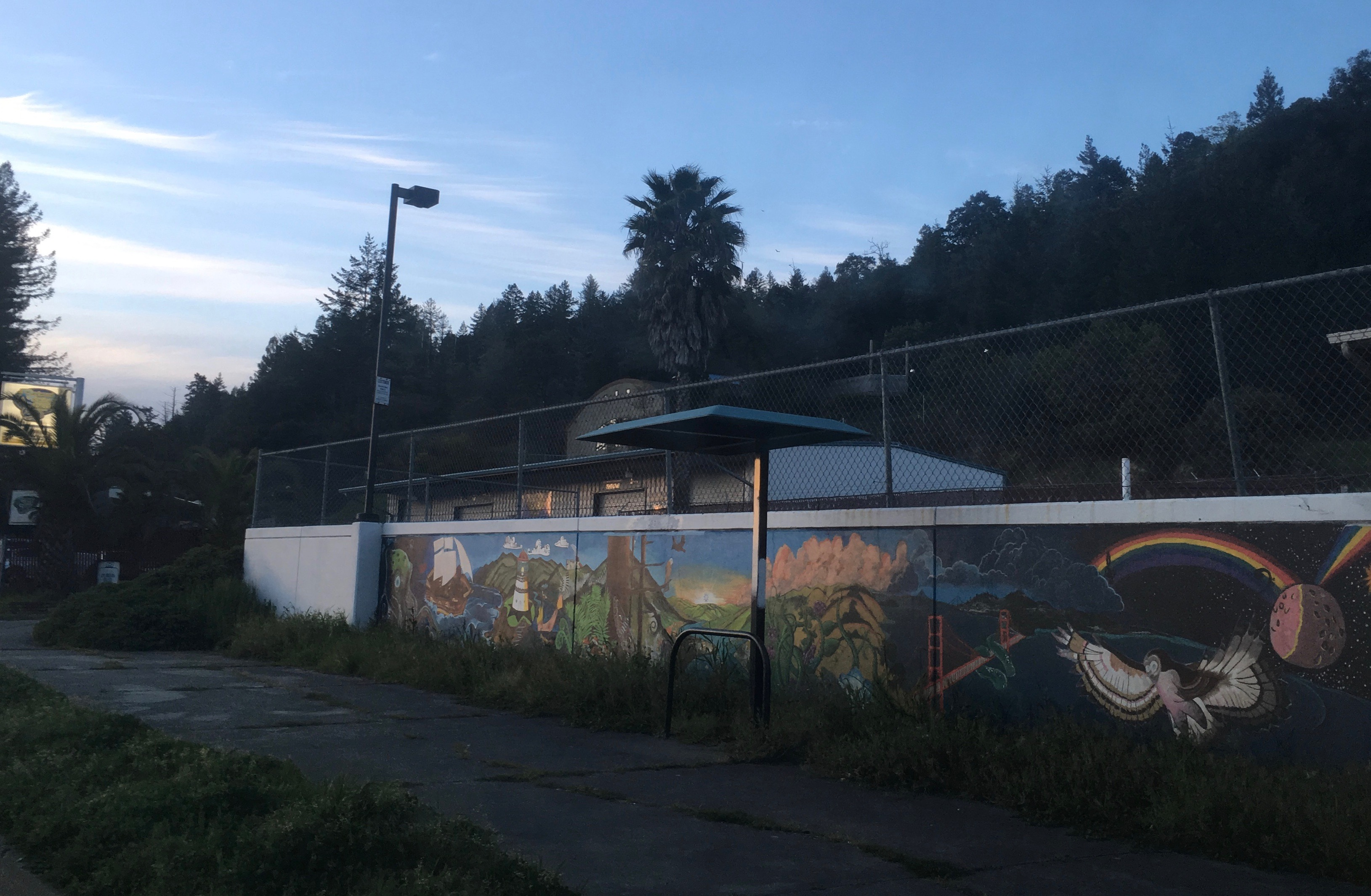
Mural in Redway

Redway is a census-designated place (CDP) in Humboldt County, California, United States. Redway is located 2.25 miles (3.6 km) northwest of Garberville, at an elevation of 538 feet (164 m). The population was 1,247 at the 2020 census, up from 1,225 at the 2010 census. Redway is also home to Redway Elementary School, with grades K–6.

== Geography ==
According to the United States Census Bureau, the CDP has a total area of 1.3 square miles (3.4 km^{2}), of which 1.25 square miles (3.2 km^{2}) is land and 0.02 square miles (0.052 km^{2}) (1.7%) is water.

== History ==
The town was founded by Oscar and Charles Burris in 1923.

Originally, Redway was a resort-style golf course in operation c. 1925–26. This is evident by some of the street names such as "Birdie", "Par", and "Green". In the 1930s, the Burris brothers formed a subdivision of summer homes.

== Demographics ==
Historical population
Census	Pop.	Note	%±
1980	1,094		—
1990	1,212		10.8%
2000	1,188		−2.0%
2010	1,225		3.1%
2020	1,247		1.8%
U.S. Decennial Census; 1860–1870 1880-1890; 1900 1910 1920; 1930 1940 1950; 1960 1970 1980; 1990 2000 2010; 2020

Redway first appeared as a census designated place in the 1980 U.S. census.

=== Racial and ethnic composition ===
Redway CDP, California – Racial and ethnic composition Note: the US Census treats Hispanic/Latino as an ethnic category. This table excludes Latinos from the racial categories and assigns them to a separate category. Hispanics/Latinos may be of any race.
Race / Ethnicity (NH = Non-Hispanic)	Pop 2000	Pop 2010	Pop 2020	% 2000	% 2010	% 2020
White alone (NH)	1,040	1,030	880	87.54%	84.08%	70.57%
Black or African American alone (NH)	1	5	12	0.08%	0.41%	0.96%
Native American or Alaska Native alone (NH)	30	34	15	2.53%	2.78%	1.20%
Asian alone (NH)	2	6	7	0.17%	0.49%	0.56%
Native Hawaiian or Pacific Islander alone (NH)	1	1	1	0.08%	0.08%	0.08%
Other race alone (NH)	1	1	4	0.08%	0.08%	0.32%
Mixed race or Multiracial (NH)	70	52	110	5.89%	4.24%	8.82%
Hispanic or Latino (any race)	43	96	218	3.62%	7.84%	17.48%
Total	1,188	1,225	1,247	100.00%	100.00%	100.00%

=== 2020 census ===
As of the 2020 census, Redway had a population of 1,247 and a population density of 996.8 inhabitants per square mile (384.9/km^{2}). The age distribution was 256 people (20.5%) under the age of 18, 62 people (5.0%) aged 18 to 24, 358 people (28.7%) aged 25 to 44, 323 people (25.9%) aged 45 to 64, and 248 people (19.9%) who were 65 years of age or older. The median age was 42.1 years. For every 100 females, there were 97.9 males, and for every 100 females age 18 and over there were 93.6 males.

The census reported that 1,222 people (98.0% of the population) lived in households, 25 (2.0%) lived in non-institutionalized group quarters, and no one was institutionalized. Of Redway's residents, 0.0% lived in urban areas and 100.0% lived in rural areas.

There were 540 households, out of which 139 (25.7%) had children under the age of 18 living in them, 164 (30.4%) were married-couple households, 59 (10.9%) were cohabiting couple households, 171 (31.7%) had a female householder with no partner present, and 146 (27.0%) had a male householder with no partner present. 197 households (36.5%) were one person, and 91 (16.9%) were one person aged 65 or older. The average household size was 2.26. There were 269 families (49.8% of all households).

There were 648 housing units at an average density of 518.0 units per square mile (200.0 units/km^{2}). Of the 648 housing units, 540 (83.3%) were occupied and 108 (16.7%) were vacant. Of occupied units, 298 (55.2%) were owner-occupied and 242 (44.8%) were occupied by renters. The homeowner vacancy rate was 1.3%, and the rental vacancy rate was 5.5%.

=== 2010 census ===
The 2010 United States census reported that Redway had a population of 1,225. The population density was 963.1 inhabitants per square mile (371.9/km^{2}). The racial makeup of Redway was 1,093 (89.2%) White, 5 (0.4%) African American, 35 (2.9%) Native American, 6 (0.5%) Asian, 1 (0.1%) Pacific Islander, 15 (1.2%) from other races, and 70 (5.7%) from two or more races. Hispanic or Latino of any race were 96 persons (7.8%).

The Census reported that 1,192 people (97.3% of the population) lived in households, 33 (2.7%) lived in non-institutionalized group quarters, and 0 (0%) were institutionalized.

There were 551 households, out of which 160 (29.0%) had children under the age of 18 living in them, 194 (35.2%) were opposite-sex married couples living together, 63 (11.4%) had a female householder with no husband present, 37 (6.7%) had a male householder with no wife present. There were 55 (10.0%) unmarried opposite-sex partnerships, and 4 (0.7%) same-sex married couples or partnerships. 209 households (37.9%) were made up of individuals, and 63 (11.4%) had someone living alone who was 65 years of age or older. The average household size was 2.16. There were 294 families (53.4% of all households); the average family size was 2.84.

The population age distribution is 278 people (22.7%) under the age of 18, 92 people (7.5%) aged 18 to 24, 306 people (25.0%) aged 25 to 44, 404 people (33.0%) aged 45 to 64, and 145 people (11.8%) who were 65 years of age or older. The median age was 40.8 years. For every 100 females, there were 93.8 males. For every 100 females age 18 and over, there were 90.5 males.

There were 679 housing units at an average density of 533.9 per square mile (206.1/km^{2}), of which 551 were occupied, of which 307 (55.7%) were owner-occupied, and 244 (44.3%) were occupied by renters. The homeowner vacancy rate was 1.6%; the rental vacancy rate was 1.2%. 658 people (53.7% of the population) lived in owner-occupied housing units and 534 people (43.6%) lived in rental housing units.

=== 2000 census ===
As of the census of 2000, the median income for a household in the CDP was $27,188, and the median income for a family was $39,464. Males had a median income of $21,853 versus $23,864 for females. The per capita income for the CDP was $24,212. About 18.6% of families and 17.0% of the population were below the poverty line, including 24.8% of those under age 18 and none of those age 65 or over.

== Politics ==
In the state legislature, Redway is in the 2nd senatorial district, represented by Democrat Mike McGuire, and the 2nd Assembly district, represented by Democrat Chris Rogers.

Federally, Redway is in California's 2nd congressional district, represented by Democrat Jared Huffman.

This area is represented locally by county supervisor Michelle Bushnell.

== See also ==
- Emerald City, California
