= Brown's Mill =

Brown's Mill may refer to:

- Battle of Brown's Mill
- Brown's Mill, California, former name of Stafford, Humboldt County, California
