= Avenue of the Giants Marathon =

Coordinates: 40°21′9″N 123°55′33″W

- Location: Humboldt County, California
- Distance: Marathon, half marathon, 10K
- Established: 1972
- Website: theave.org

The Avenue of the Giants Marathon is held annually in May along the Avenue of the Giants in Humboldt Redwoods State Park in Humboldt County, California, United States.

The course, consisting of two out-and-back legs, is almost entirely under the canopy of redwood trees. Half marathon and 10K races are run concurrently. The event, one of four larger annual races organized by the Six Rivers Running Club, was first run in 1972. In 2011, more than 2300 runners participated.

A sister event, the Humboldt Redwoods Marathon, is run in October over the same course.

The Avenue of the Giants Marathon is a qualifying event for the Boston Marathon.
