= Riverside Park, California =

Unincorporated community in California, United States

Riverside Park
- Unincorporated community
- Location in California Riverside Park (the United States)
- Coordinates: 40°29′42″N 123°59′34″W
- Country: United States
- State: California
- County: Humboldt
- Elevation: 253 ft (77 m)

Riverside Park is an unincorporated community in Humboldt County, California, United States. It is located on the Van Duzen River, 7 miles (11 km) north-northwest of Redcrest, at an elevation of 253 feet (77 m). Area buildings are primarily summer home properties along the river.
