= Humboldt Redwoods Marathon =

Coordinates: 40°21′9″N 123°55′33″W

The Humboldt Redwoods Marathon is held annually in October along the Avenue of the Giants in scenic Humboldt Redwoods State Park in Humboldt County, CA. The course, consisting of two out-and-back legs, is almost entirely under the canopy of towering redwood trees. Half marathon and 5K events are run concurrently. The event, one of four larger annual races organized by the Six Rivers Running Club, was first run in 1978. In 2009, more than 1,000 runners participated.

A sister event, the Avenue of the Giants Marathon, is run in May over the same course.

The Humboldt Redwoods Marathon is a qualifying event for the Boston Marathon.
