= Blocksburg, California =

Unincorporated community in California, United States

Blocksburg
- Unincorporated community
- Location in California
- Coordinates: 40°16′34″N 123°38′11″W
- Country: United States
- State: California
- County: Humboldt
- Elevation: 1,594 ft (486 m)

Blocksburg (formerly, Larrabee, Blocksburgh, Blockburger's and Powellville) is an unincorporated community in Humboldt County, California, United States. It is located 15 miles (24 km) east-southeast of Weott, at an elevation of 1,594 feet (486 m). The ZIP Code is 95514.

The Blocksburgh post office opened in 1877. The name was changed to Blocksburg in 1893, and was named for Benjamin Blockburger, a local merchant. Blocksburg at one time had hotels, saloons, doctor and dentist offices, and a variety of other businesses. The town declined after the Redwood Highway bypassed it upon its completion in 1920.

== See also ==
- Henry P. Larrabee
