= Holmes, California =

Unincorporated community in California, United States

Holmes
- Unincorporated community
- Location in California Holmes (the United States)
- Coordinates: 40°25′06″N 123°56′26″W
- Country: United States
- State: California
- County: Humboldt County
- Elevation: 154 ft (47 m)

Holmes (formerly Holmes Camp, and also known as Holmes Flat) is an unincorporated community in Humboldt County, California, United States. It is located 2.25 miles (3.6 km) north of Redcrest, at an elevation of 154 feet (47 m).

A post office operated at Holmes from 1910 to 1965. Holmes was named for a lumber company executive.
