= Avenue of the Giants =

Highway in California

State Route 254
- Avenue of the Giants
- SR 254 highlighted in red

Route information
- Maintained by Caltrans
- Length: 31.595 mi (50.847 km)

Major junctions
- South end: US 101 near Phillipsville
- North end: US 101 near Stafford

Location
- Country: United States
- State: California
- Counties: Humboldt

Highway system
- State highways in California; Interstate; US; State; Scenic; History; Pre‑1964; Unconstructed; Deleted; Freeways
← SR 253	→ SR 255

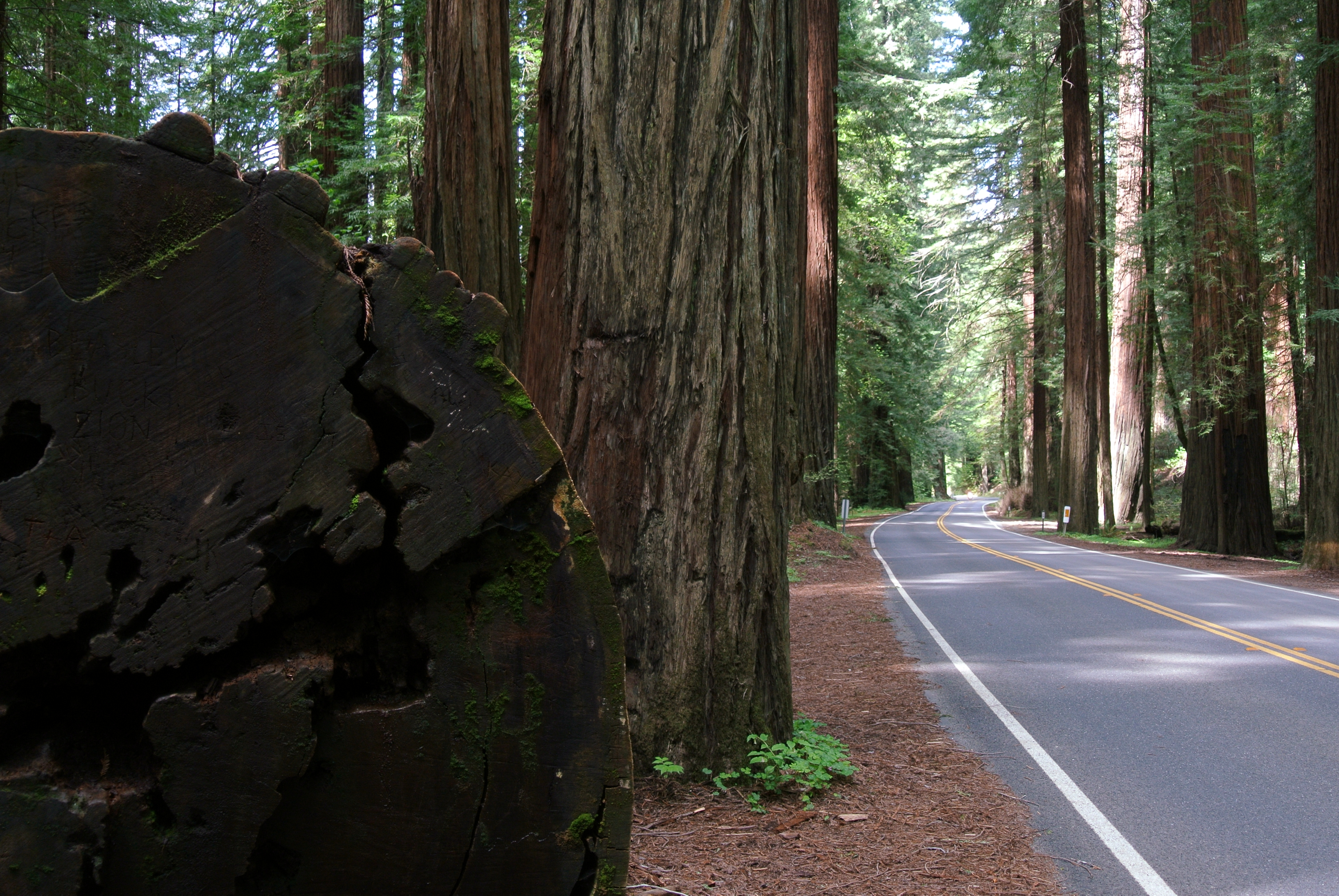
SR 254 and coast redwoods, Humboldt Redwoods State Park

The Avenue of the Giants is a scenic highway in northern California, United States, running through Humboldt Redwoods State Park. It is named for the coast redwoods that tower over the route. The road is a former alignment of U.S. Route 101, and continues to be maintained as a state highway as State Route 254 (SR 254).

== Route description ==
Route 254 is defined in section 554 of the California Streets and Highways Code, and that the highway "is the Avenue of the Giants, comprising a portion of the former Redwood Highway through and connecting a number of state park units, from Route 101 near the Sylvandale interchange to Route 101 south of Stafford.

The Avenue's southern terminus is at US 101 near Phillipsville, north of Garberville. Its northern terminus is at US 101 near Stafford, 15 miles (24 km) south of Fortuna. The road parallels the scenic Eel River, and connects the small towns Phillipsville, Miranda, Myers Flat, Weott, Englewood, Redcrest and Pepperwood. The two-lane road has a number of parking areas, campgrounds, picnic sites, and attractions for visitors. The nearby river provides many swimming locations, such as those at the Rockefeller Forest redwood grove.

The route contains the site of the annual "Avenue of the Giants Marathon".

SR 254 is not part of the National Highway System, a network of highways that are considered essential to the country's economy, defense, and mobility by the Federal Highway Administration. SR 254 is eligible to be included in the State Scenic Highway System, but it is not officially designated as a scenic highway by the California Department of Transportation.

=== Immortal Tree ===
Though not the oldest redwood in the forest, this large tree is at age millennium, and is currently around 250 ft (76 m) tall, though originally it was much taller. It has survived not only the ravages of time but also a 1908 attempt at logging, the 1964 flood of the area, and a direct lightning strike which removed the top 45 feet (14 m) of the tree (making its original height close to 300 ft). It is from its age and perceived hardiness that the tree derives its name. Markers are visible on the tree, denoting the heights of where the loggers' axes and the floodwaters struck the tree.

Located in the northern half of the Avenue, The Immortal Tree is easy to find, and has a large gift shop and parking area situated in front of it.

=== Founder's Grove ===
Near Weott, this grove has a half-mile self-guided walk with informational booklets available at the beginning of the trail. The trail showcases an old-growth redwood forest and contains a few very large trees, including the Founder's Tree (346.1. ft. tall) and the Dyerville Giant (c. 370 ft. tall), which fell in 1991.

=== Drive-Through Tree ===
Avenue of the Giants features a tree that visitors can drive through. Shrine Drive-Thru Tree is near the town of Myers Flat. It is privately held; the owner charges $15 or more for a car to drive through it.

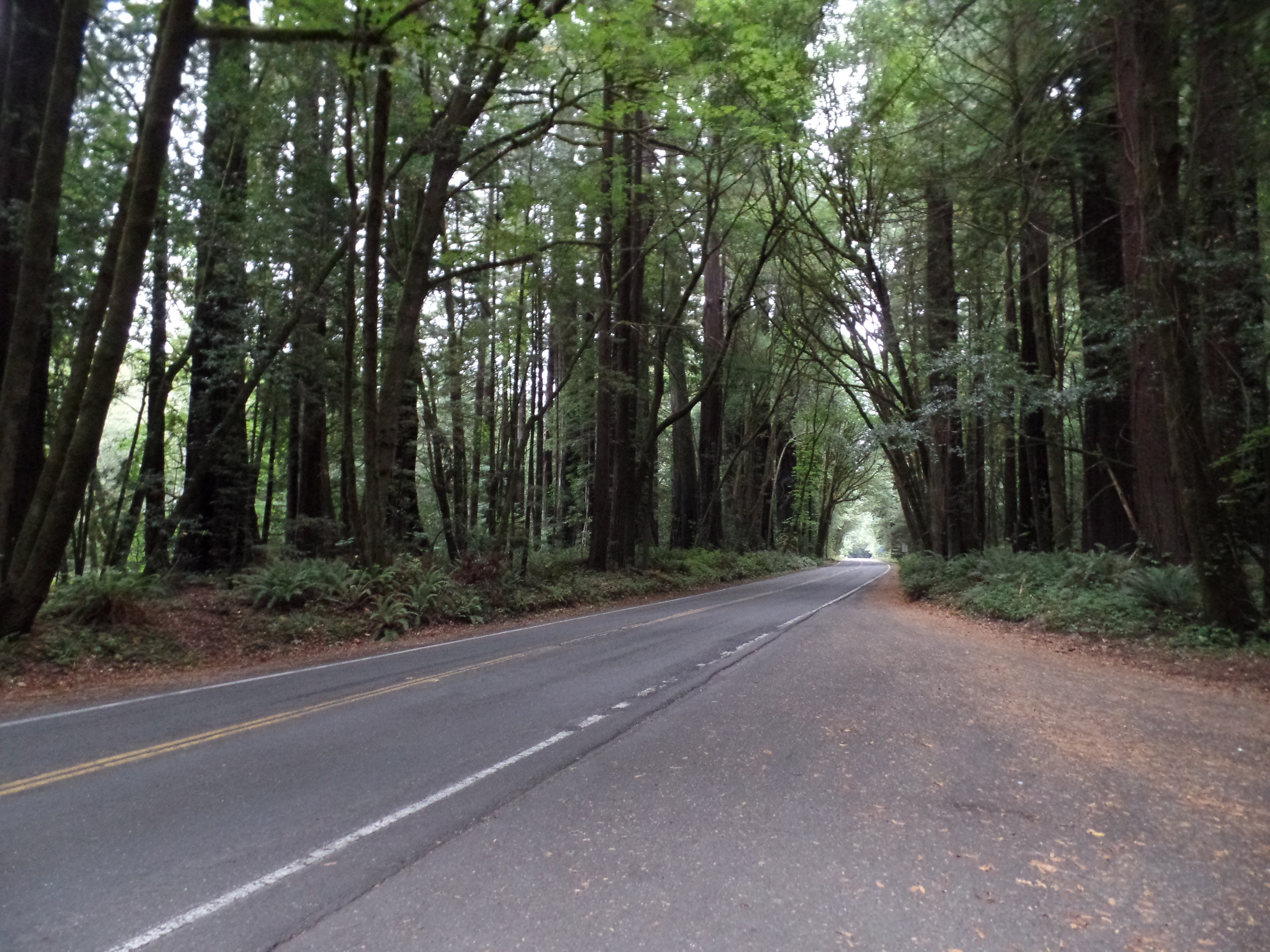
Avenue of the Giants passes through a redwood forest

=== Tree House ===
Not a traditional tree house, this is actually a house that is, albeit partially, built within a giant redwood.

Visible from the road, and with tours available, the front of the house is entered through the hollow trunk of a still-living tree. The front door and windows are clearly visible to passersby, and the rest of the house adjoins the rear of the tree in a more traditional style.

=== Eel River and South Fork ===
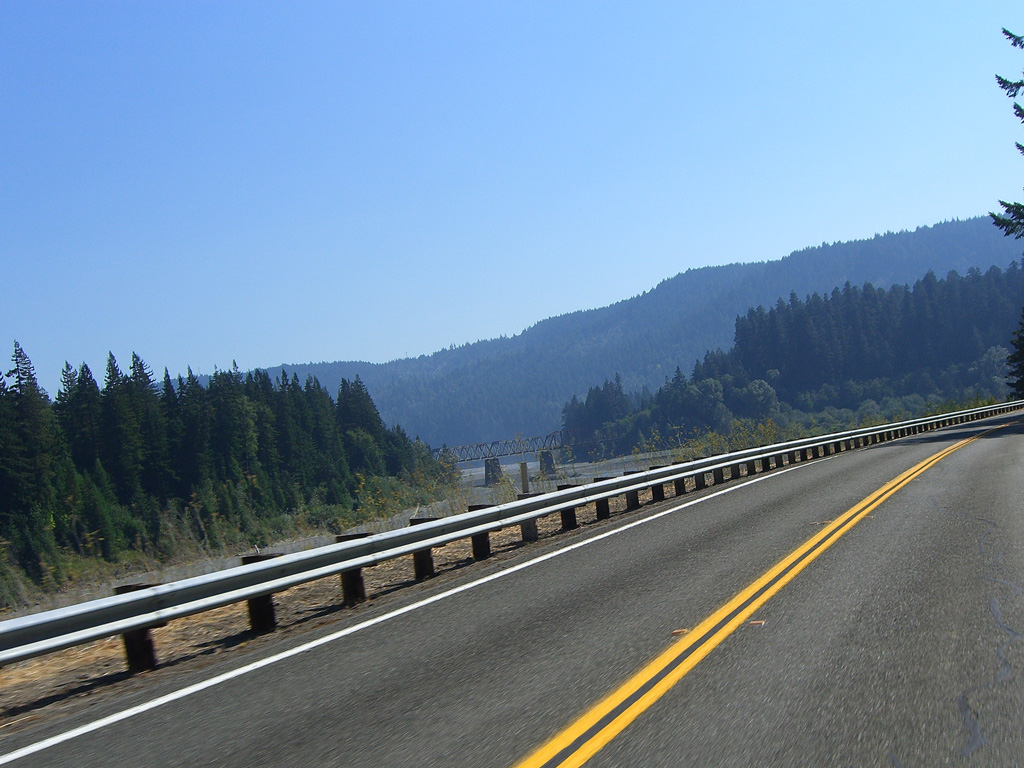
Eel River, as seen from part of the Avenue

The Eel River is the third largest river in California. It carves deep canyons down great mountains, through flat valleys, and past ancient redwood forests. The Avenue of the Giants mainly follows the South Fork of the river, but does pass the confluence of the South and Main forks near its northern terminus.

== History ==
The Avenue of the Giants was part of U.S. Route 101 until a freeway bypass was completed on August 27, 1960, assuming the 101 designation. The Avenue was then designated as CA Route 254 by Assembly Concurrent Resolution 10.

== Major intersections ==
Except where prefixed with a letter, postmiles were measured on the road as it was in 1964, based on the alignment that existed at the time, and do not necessarily reflect current mileage. Postmile prefixes include: R reflecting a realignment in the route since then, M indicating a second realignment, L referring to an overlap due to a correction or change, and T indicating postmiles classified as temporary. Segments that remain unconstructed or have been relinquished to local control may be omitted. The entire route is in Humboldt County.

Location	Postmile	Destinations	Notes
	0.00	US 101 – Ukiah, Eureka	Southern terminus; interchange; US 101 exit 645
	4.84	Maple Hills Road to US 101	
Myers Flat	12.33	US 101 – Ukiah, Eureka	Interchange; US 101 exit 656
Weott	18.29	Newton Road to US 101	
	20.59	Dyerville Loop Road to US 101 south – South Fork	Connects to US 101 north exit 663
	20.78	Bull Creek Flats Road – Honeydew	Connects to US 101 south exit 663
	20.87	US 101 north – Eureka	On-ramp from SR 254 to US 101 north only
	20.87	US 101 south	Off-ramp from US 101 south to SR 254 only; US 101 south exit 667A
	24.76	Sorenson Road to US 101	
	28.42	Barkdull Road to US 101	
	31.52	US 101 – Ukiah, Eureka	Northern terminus; interchange; US 101 exit 674
1.000 mi = 1.609 km; 1.000 km = 0.621 mi: Incomplete access

== Gallery ==
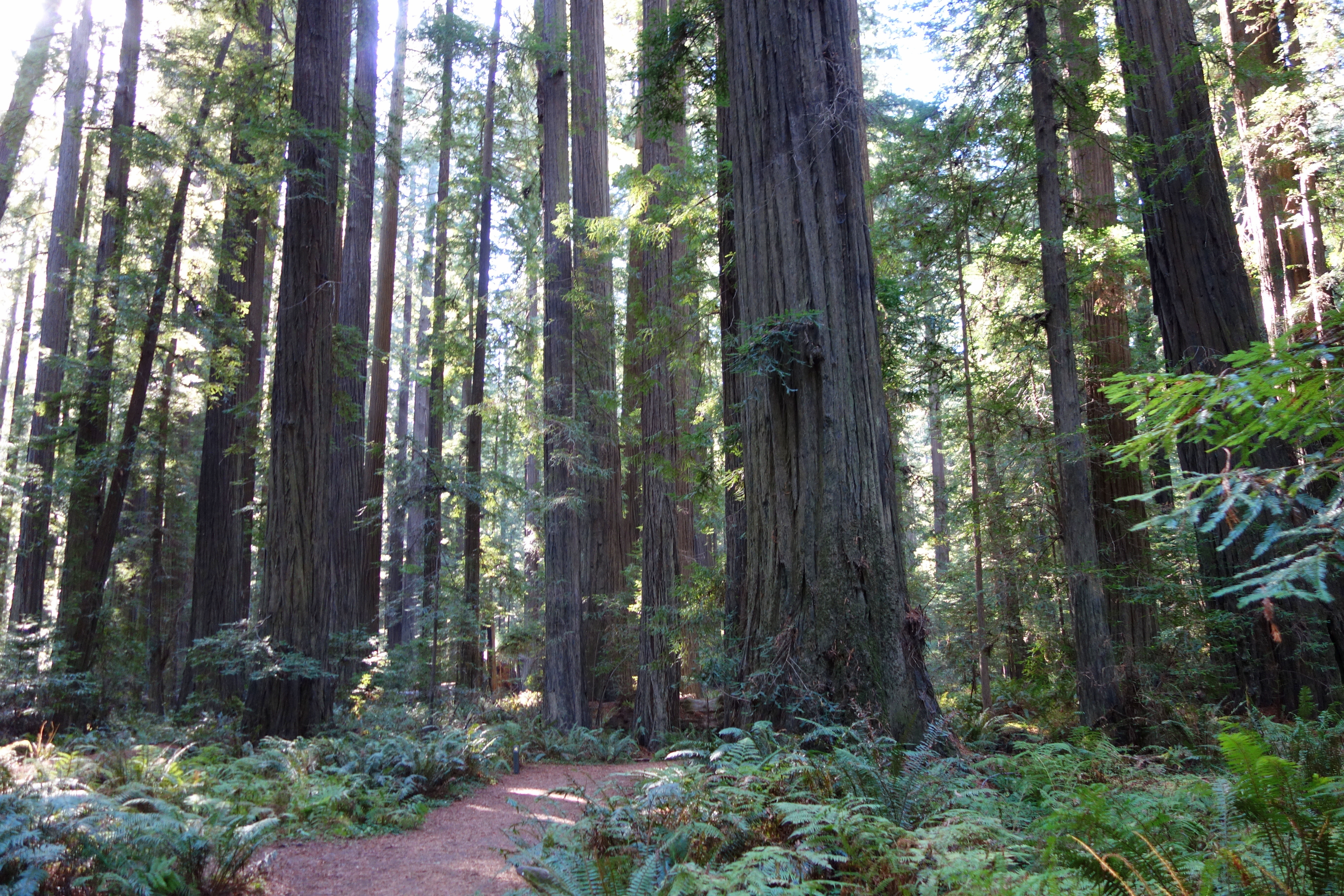
Founder's Grove

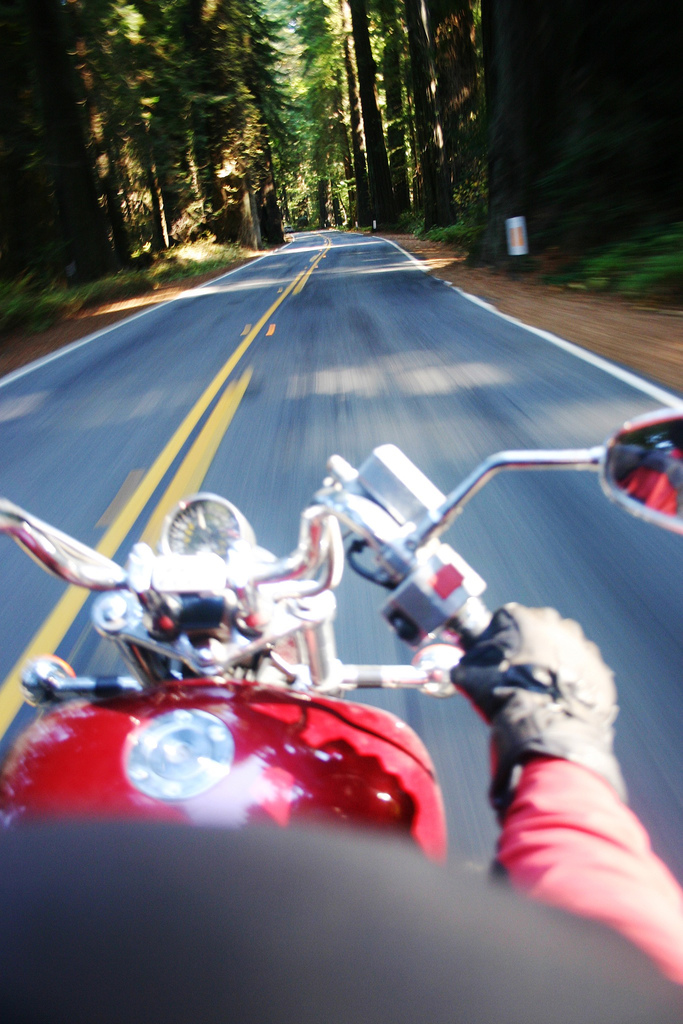
Rider's point of view

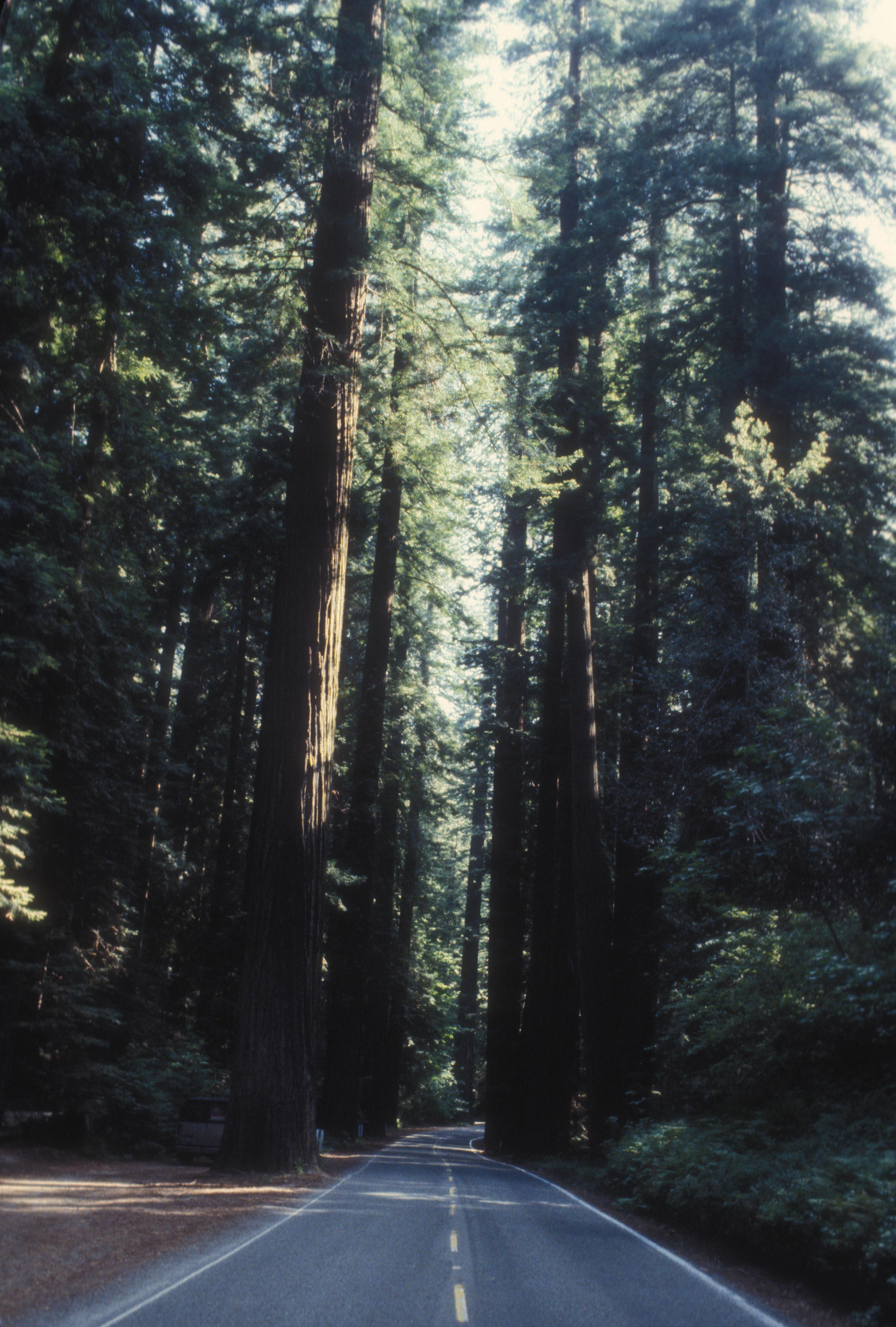
The park

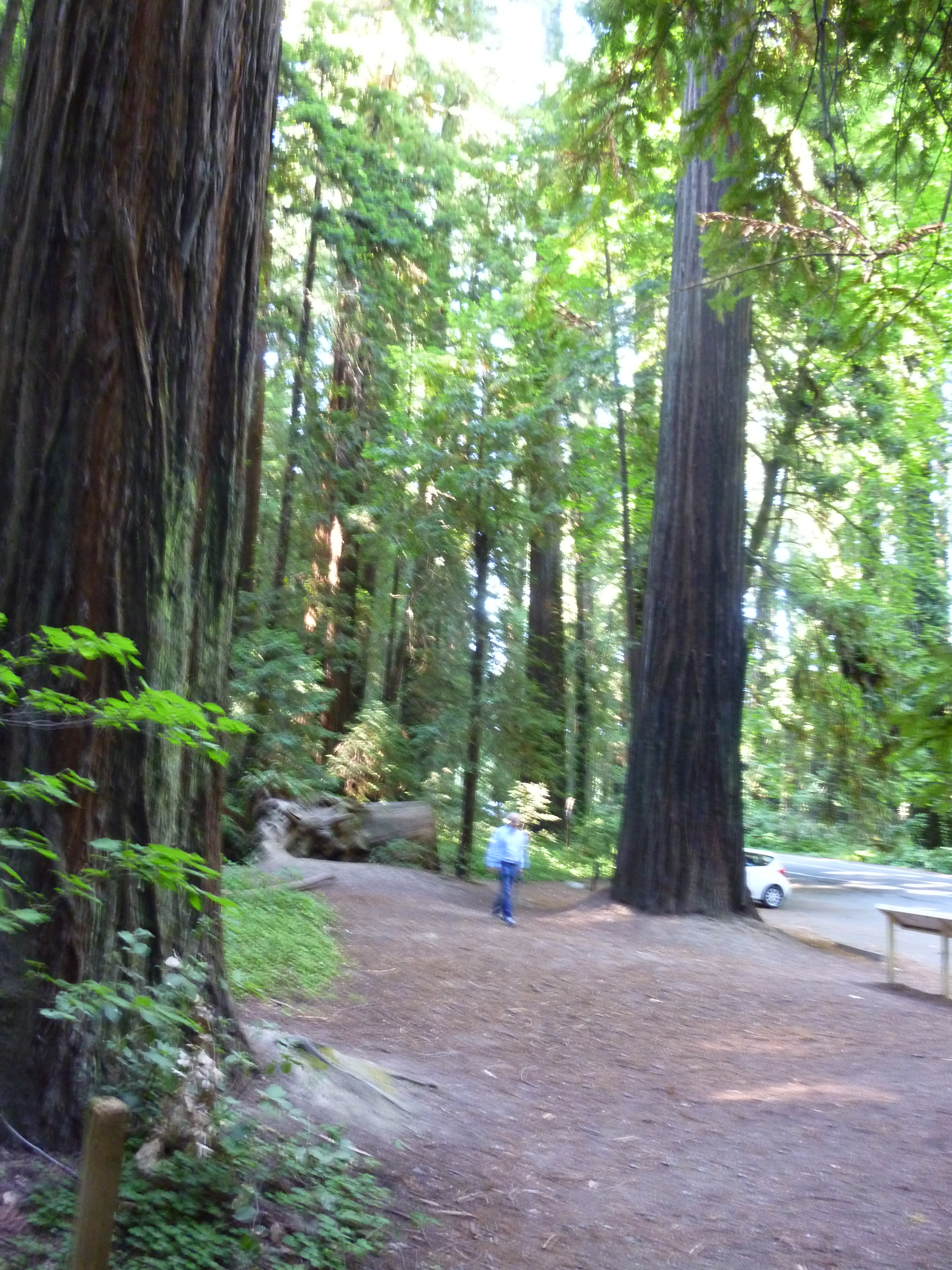
Chandler Grove

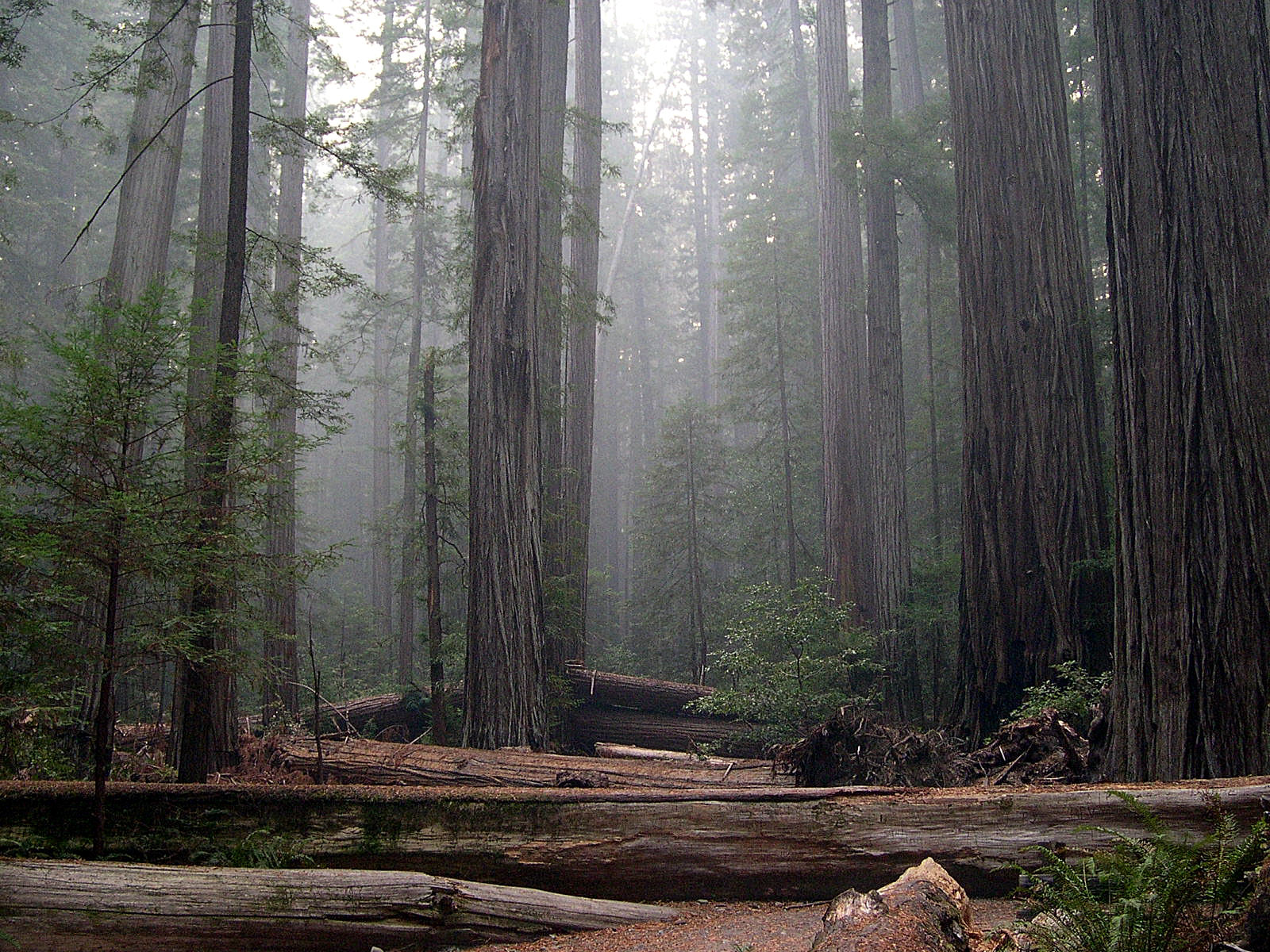
Rockefeller Forest

== In popular culture ==
The Avenue of the Giants was featured by Huell Howser in Road Trip Episode 105.

== See also ==
- U.S. Route 199 (Redwood Highway)
- Generals Highway
- Chandelier Tree
- List of giant sequoia groves
