= Benbow Inn =

- U.S. National Register of Historic Places
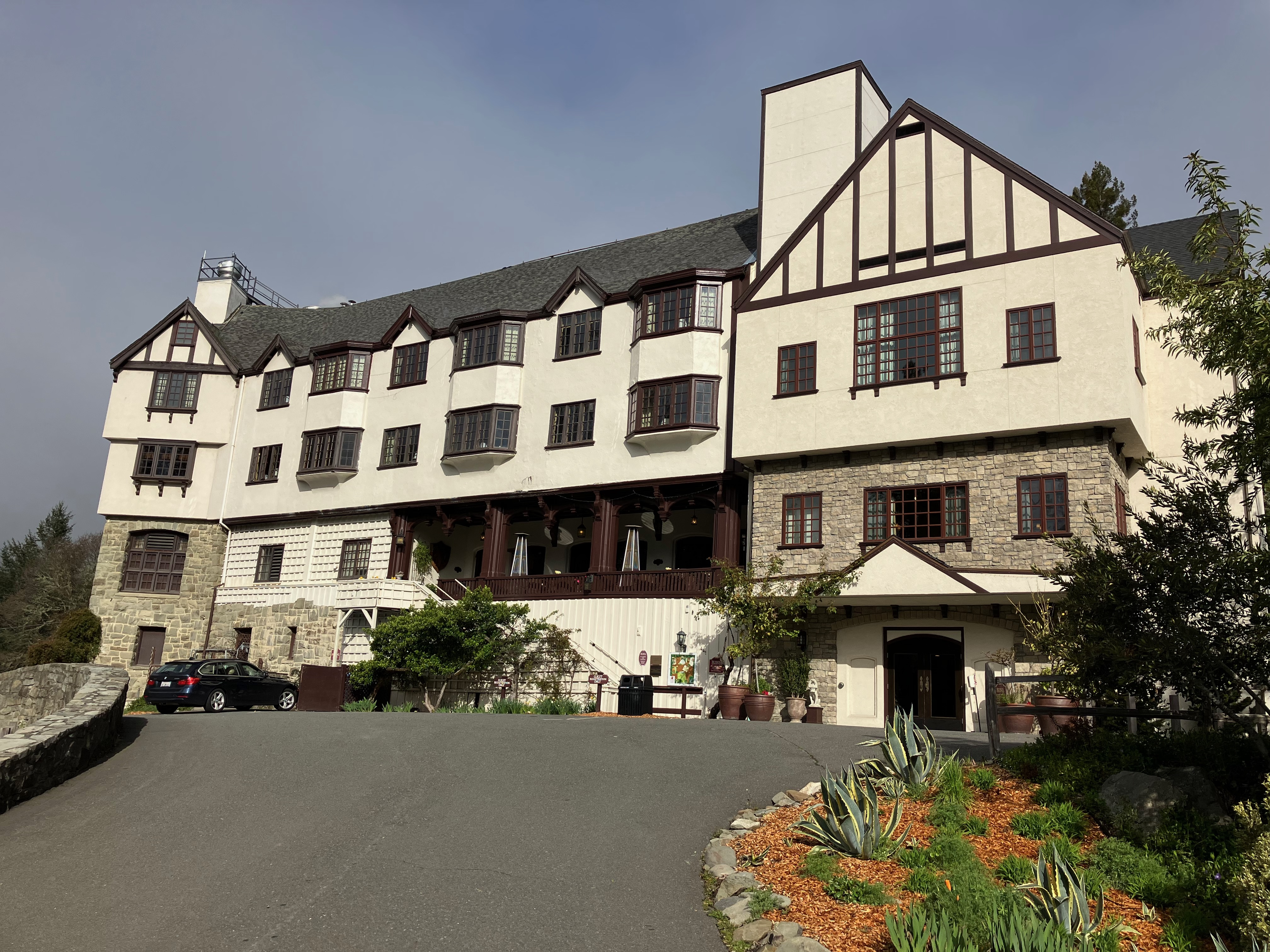

- Location within California
- Location: 445 Lake Benbow Drive, Garberville, California
- Coordinates: 40°04′04″N 123°47′19″W
- Area: 3 acres (1.2 ha)
- Built: 1926
- Built by: Farr, Albert
- Architectural style: Tudor Revival
- NRHP reference No.: 83001179
- Added to NRHP: September 15, 1983

The Benbow Inn, near Garberville, California, is a hotel built in 1926.

It was an early hotel on the Redwood Highway and was originally called the Hotel Benbow.

The Benbow Inn was listed on the National Register of Historic Places in 1983.

It is built of Douglas fir in the Tudor Revival style.

It is a member of the Historic Hotels of America.

== History ==
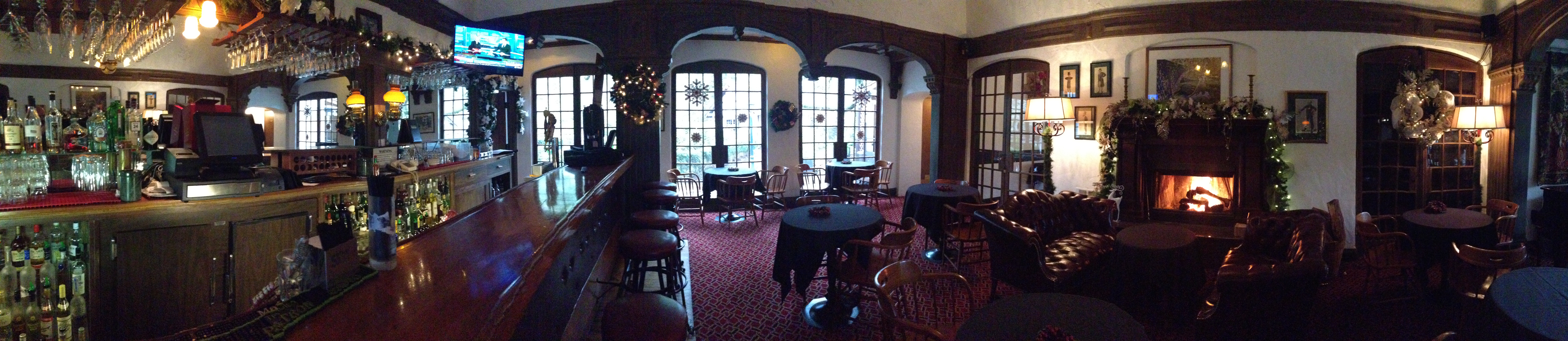
Panoramic view of Benbow Inn bar, 2014

The Benbow Historic Inn was designed by architect Albert Farr, who was famous for designing the Wolf House for novelist Jack London. The Benbow family built the hotel, the Benbow Dam, Power Company, as well as the nearby recreational vehicle park and golf course as part of their resort community along the Redwood Highway.

The Benbow Inn was host to Hollywood's elite and other high standing political guests, offering them fine dining, horseback riding, golfing, hiking, swimming, boating, and fishing in the nearby Eel River.
