= Myers Flat, California =

Myers Flat
- Census designated place
- Location in California
- Coordinates: 40°15′59″N 123°52′13″W
- Country: United States
- State: California
- County: Humboldt

Area
  - Total: 0.487 sq mi (1.261 km^{2})
  - Land: 0.432 sq mi (1.119 km^{2})
  - Water: 0.055 sq mi (0.142 km^{2}) 11.2%
- Elevation: 203 ft (62 m)

Population (2020)
  - Total: 90
  - Density: 210/sq mi (80/km^{2})
- Time zone: UTC-8 (Pacific)
  - Summer (DST): UTC-7 (PDT)
- ZIP code: 95554
- Area code: 707
- GNIS feature IDs: 229396, 2611442

Myers Flat (formerly Myers) is a census-designated place in Humboldt County, California, United States. It is located 4.5 miles (7.2 km) south-southeast of Weott, at an elevation of 203 feet (62 m). The ZIP Code is 95554. The population was 90 at the 2020 census.

Originally called Myers from the Grant Myers Ranch, "Flat" was added to the name to distinguish the place from Meyers in El Dorado County.

The Myers Flat post office opened in 1949.

Myers Flat is located along the California State Route 254, also known as Avenue of the Giants. The US Post Office's ZIP Code is 95554. The community is inside area code 707.

== History ==
Myers Flat was founded by the Myers family in the mid-19th century. The Myerses were some of the first homesteaders in the area, growing apples, pears, sweet potatoes, and corn. The town initially served as a coach stop for travelers on their way to San Francisco. The Morrison-Jackson mill opened and remained active until the mid-1980s, when the mill closed down. The old mill site and most of its land are now a part of Riverbend Cellars and much of the land is covered in grape vineyards. Much of the town was destroyed in the Christmas flood of 1964. Because of its low elevation and proximity to the Eel River, the town still has problems with flooding. The town lies below the 100-year flood line. Much of the town consists of trailers and cabins, and some people have homes built to withstand floodwaters.

== Demographics ==
Historical population
Census	Pop.	Note	%±
2010	146		—
2020	90		−38.4%
U.S. Decennial Census; 1860–1870 1880-1890; 1900 1910 1920; 1930 1940 1950; 1960 1970 1980; 1990 2000 2010

Myers Flat first appeared as a census designated place in the 2010 U.S. census.

The 2020 United States census reported that Myers Flat had a population of 90. The population density was 208.3 inhabitants per square mile (80.4/km^{2}). The racial makeup of Myers Flat was 69 (77%) White, 1 (1%) African American, 0 (0%) Native American, 3 (3%) Asian, 0 (0%) Pacific Islander, 5 (6%) from other races, and 12 (13%) from two or more races. Hispanic or Latino of any race were 7 persons (8%).

The whole population lived in households. There were 45 households, out of which 10 (22%) had children under the age of 18 living in them, 18 (40%) were married-couple households, 11 (24%) were cohabiting couple households, 11 (24%) had a female householder with no partner present, and 5 (11%) had a male householder with no partner present. 6 households (13%) were one person, and 4 (9%) were one person aged 65 or older. The average household size was 2.00. There were 34 families (76% of all households).

The age distribution was 11 people (12%) under the age of 18, 4 people (4%) aged 18 to 24, 21 people (23%) aged 25 to 44, 37 people (41%) aged 45 to 64, and 17 people (19%) who were 65 years of age or older. The median age was 48.5 years. There were 41 males and 49 females.

There were 90 housing units at an average density of 208.3 units per square mile (80.4 units/km^{2}), of which 45 (50%) were occupied. Of these, 34 (76%) were owner-occupied, and 11 (24%) were occupied by renters.

== Culture ==
Because of its location at the southern entrance to Humboldt Redwoods State Park, the town receives much tourism during the summer months.

== Government ==
In the California State Legislature, Myers Flat is in the 2nd senatorial district, represented by Democrat Mike McGuire, and the 2nd Assembly district, represented by Democrat Chris Rogers.

In the United States House of Representatives, Myers Flat is in California's 2nd congressional district, represented by Democrat Jared Huffman.

== Climate ==
This region experiences warm (but not hot) and dry summers, with no average monthly temperatures above 71.6 °F (22.0 °C). According to the Köppen Climate Classification system, Myers Flat has a warm-summer Mediterranean climate, abbreviated Csb on climate maps.
