= South Fork, Humboldt County, California =

Unincorporated community in Humboldt County, California

Coordinates: 40°20′41″N 123°55′00″W

South Fork is an unincorporated community in Humboldt County, California, United States.

In 1955, South Fork was a town of 300 inhabitants. The town was devastated by the Christmas flood of 1964, which destroyed 10 houses and the station building.
