= Phillipsville, California =

Phillipsville
- Census designated place
- Location in California
- Coordinates: 40°12′33″N 123°47′09″W
- Country: United States
- State: California
- County: Humboldt

Area
  - Total: 0.743 sq mi (1.924 km^{2})
  - Land: 0.715 sq mi (1.851 km^{2})
  - Water: 0.028 sq mi (0.073 km^{2}) 3.8%
- Elevation: 289 ft (88 m)

Population (2020)
  - Total: 124
  - Density: 174/sq mi (67.0/km^{2})
- Time zone: UTC-8 (Pacific)
  - Summer (DST): UTC-7 (PDT)
- ZIP code: 95559
- Area code: 707
- GNIS feature IDs: 230600, 2628776

Phillipsville (formerly Kettintelbe, Philippsville, and Phillips Flat) is a census-designated place in Humboldt County, California, United States. It is located on the South Fork of the Eel River, 7.5 miles (12.1 km) north of Garberville, at an elevation of 289 feet (88 m). It is the southernmost town on the Avenue of the Giants. Near the town is the Chimney Tree redwood, so named due to its resemblance to that object. The ZIP Code is 95559. The community is inside area code 707. The population was 124 at the 2020 census.

== History ==
A post office operated at Phillipsville from 1883 to 1912, and from 1948 to the present. The name was originally Philips Flat, in honor of George Stump Philips who settled at the place in 1865. The name was changed to Kettintelbe after a local Native American village, but reverted to Phillipsville when the post office reopened in 1948. Phillipsville was home to many popular lodgings, including the Riverwood Inn, Madrona Motel, and the DeerHorn Lodge.

== Climate ==
The climate in Phillipsville is a warm-summer mediterranean climate (Köppen: Csb) in the tall coniferous mediterranean forest biome. Here, the distance from the ocean and the geographical position of the town behind the Northern Coast Ranges results in a strong diurnal temperature variation, especially during the summer months compared to Eureka, on the coast. Winters are cold and extremely rainy with occasional (although rare) frosts at night. Summers are warm and extremely dry with very hot days (85-90°F on average) but surprisingly cool nights (around 50°F on average).

Climate data for Phillipsville, California, 40.2092°N 123.7858°W, 509 feet (155 m)
Month	Jan	Feb	Mar	Apr	May	Jun	Jul	Aug	Sep	Oct	Nov	Dec	Year
Mean daily maximum °F (°C)	54.6 (12.6)	58.2 (14.6)	61.1 (16.2)	65.6 (18.7)	72.2 (22.3)	78.3 (25.7)	88.4 (31.3)	88.5 (31.4)	85.8 (29.9)	75.6 (24.2)	60.4 (15.8)	52.9 (11.6)	70.1 (21.2)
Daily mean °F (°C)	46.5 (8.1)	48.5 (9.2)	50.5 (10.3)	53.6 (12.0)	58.9 (14.9)	63.7 (17.6)	70.2 (21.2)	70.2 (21.2)	67.1 (19.5)	59.9 (15.5)	50.7 (10.4)	45.4 (7.4)	57.1 (13.9)
Mean daily minimum °F (°C)	38.4 (3.6)	38.8 (3.8)	40.0 (4.4)	41.5 (5.3)	45.6 (7.6)	49.1 (9.5)	52.1 (11.2)	51.8 (11.0)	48.5 (9.2)	44.2 (6.8)	41.0 (5.0)	37.9 (3.3)	44.1 (6.7)
Average precipitation inches (mm)	10.87 (276)	8.02 (204)	8.47 (215)	4.19 (106)	1.92 (49)	0.73 (19)	0.08 (2.0)	0.08 (2.0)	0.56 (14)	2.78 (71)	6.16 (156)	10.44 (265)	54.3 (1,379)
Source: PRISM (spatially interpolated, 1991-2020 normals)

== Demographics ==
Historical population
Census	Pop.	Note	%±
2010	140		—
2020	124		−11.4%
U.S. Decennial Census; 1860–1870 1880-1890; 1900 1910 1920; 1930 1940 1950; 1960 1970 1980; 1990 2000 2010

Phillipsville first appeared as a census designated place in the 2010 U.S. census.

The 2020 United States census reported that Phillipsville had a population of 124. The population density was 173.4 inhabitants per square mile (67.0/km^{2}). The racial makeup of Phillipsville was 97 (78.2%) White, 1 (0.8%) African American, 3 (2.4%) Native American, 3 (2.4%) Asian, 0 (0.0%) Pacific Islander, 11 (8.9%) from other races, and 9 (7.3%) from two or more races. Hispanic or Latino of any race were 22 persons (17.7%).

The whole population lived in households. There were 44 households, out of which 7 (15.9%) had children under the age of 18 living in them, 17 (38.6%) were married-couple households, 3 (6.8%) were cohabiting couple households, 0 (0.0%) had a female householder with no partner present, and 24 (54.5%) had a male householder with no partner present. 16 households (36.4%) were one person, and 8 (18.2%) were one person aged 65 or older. The average household size was 2.82. There were 23 families (52.3% of all households).

The age distribution was 13 people (10.5%) under the age of 18, 5 people (4.0%) aged 18 to 24, 35 people (28.2%) aged 25 to 44, 47 people (37.9%) aged 45 to 64, and 24 people (19.4%) who were 65 years of age or older. The median age was 54.5 years. There were 69 males and 55 females.

There were 67 housing units at an average density of 93.7 units per square mile (36.2 units/km^{2}), of which 44 (65.7%) were occupied. Of these, 41 (93.2%) were owner-occupied, and 3 (6.8%) were occupied by renters.

== Government ==
In the California State Legislature, Phillipsville is in the 2nd senatorial district, represented by Democrat Mike McGuire, and the 2nd Assembly district, represented by Democrat Chris Rogers.

In the United States House of Representatives, Phillipsville is in California's 2nd congressional district, represented by Democrat Jared Huffman.
