= Miranda, California =

Miranda
- Census designated place
- Location in California
- Coordinates: 40°14′05″N 123°49′25″W
- Country: United States
- State: California
- County: Humboldt

Area
  - Total: 1.502 sq mi (3.889 km^{2})
  - Land: 1.493 sq mi (3.868 km^{2})
  - Water: 0.0081 sq mi (0.021 km^{2}) 0.53%
- Elevation: 351 ft (107 m)

Population (2020)
  - Total: 441
  - Density: 295/sq mi (114/km^{2})
- Time zone: UTC-8 (Pacific)
  - Summer (DST): UTC-7 (PDT)
- GNIS feature IDs: 228824, 2611441

Miranda (formerly Jacobsen's) is a census-designated place in Humboldt County, California, United States. It is located 2.5 miles (4 km) northwest of Phillipsville, at an elevation of 351 feet (107 m). The ZIP Code is 95553. The population was 441 at the 2020 census.

The name Miranda was originally applied to the area's post office on August 26, 1905. One account states that it is not known whether the name giver had in mind a girl or the well-known Spanish place name and family name. Miranda was known as Jacobsen's Valley until the post office was established. Another account states that Etta Coombs chose the name "Miranda" for the post office she started. Miranda is located on the Avenue of the Giants between Myers Flat to the north and Phillipsville to the south.

South Fork High School is the only regular high school of Southern Humboldt Unified School District, and currently boasts around 150 students from all of southern Humboldt County. The school's name refers to the South Fork of the Eel River. Osprey Learning Center, an alternative continuation high school, is located across the football field from SFHS in facilities that formerly housed Miranda Junior High School. Today, Miranda Junior High School now stands where the former tennis court was, as construction was completed in 2014.

The ZIP Code is 95553. The community is inside area code 707. Elevation is said to be 351 feet at the town sign, though the terrain is generally not flat and encompasses elevations ranging from sea level to over 2,000 feet (610 m). Miranda is in the Pacific Standard Time zone and observes daylight saving time.

== Demographics ==
Historical population
Census	Pop.	Note	%±
2010	520		—
2020	441		−15.2%
U.S. Decennial Census; 1860–1870 1880-1890; 1900 1910 1920; 1930 1940 1950; 1960 1970 1980; 1990 2000 2010

Miranda first appeared as a census designated place in the 2010 U.S. census.

Race and Ethnicity
Racial and ethnic composition	2010	2020
White (non-Hispanic)	77.5%	73.7%
Hispanic or Latino (of any race)	14.42%	15.42%
Two or more races (non-Hispanic)	4.42%	5.9%
Black or African American (non-Hispanic)	0.38%	2.04%
Native American (non-Hispanic)	2.31%	1.81%
Asian (non-Hispanic)	0.77%	0.68%
Other (non-Hispanic)	0.0%	0.45%
Pacific Islander (non-Hispanic)	0.19%	0.0%

=== 2020 ===
The 2020 United States census reported that Miranda had a population of 441. The population density was 295.2 inhabitants per square mile (114.0/km^{2}). The racial makeup of Miranda was 341 (77.3%) White, 9 (2.0%) African American, 8 (1.8%) Native American, 3 (0.7%) Asian, 0 (0.0%) Pacific Islander, 36 (8.2%) from other races, and 44 (10.0%) from two or more races. Hispanic or Latino of any race were 68 persons (15.4%).

The whole population lived in households. There were 199 households, out of which 44 (22.1%) had children under the age of 18 living in them, 65 (32.7%) were married-couple households, 9 (4.5%) were cohabiting couple households, 66 (33.2%) had a female householder with no partner present, and 59 (29.6%) had a male householder with no partner present. 69 households (34.7%) were one person, and 18 (9.0%) were one person aged 65 or older. The average household size was 2.22. There were 107 families (53.8% of all households).

The age distribution was 83 people (18.8%) under the age of 18, 43 people (9.8%) aged 18 to 24, 136 people (30.8%) aged 25 to 44, 106 people (24.0%) aged 45 to 64, and 73 people (16.6%) who were 65 years of age or older. The median age was 39.9 years. For every 100 females, there were 92.6 males.

There were 219 housing units at an average density of 146.6 units per square mile (56.6 units/km^{2}), of which 199 (90.9%) were occupied. Of these, 86 (43.2%) were owner-occupied, and 113 (56.8%) were occupied by renters.

=== 2010 ===
The 2010 United States census reported that Miranda had a population of 520. The population density was 346.8 inhabitants per square mile (133.9/km^{2}). The racial makeup of Miranda was 439 (84.4%) White, 4 (0.8%) African American, 13 (2.5%) Native American, 4 (0.8%) Asian, 1 (0.2%) Pacific Islander, 31 (6.0%) from other races, and 28 (5.4%) from two or more races. Hispanic or Latino of any race were 75 persons (14.4%).

The Census reported that 512 people (98.5% of the population) lived in households, 8 (1.5%) lived in non-institutionalized group quarters, and 0 (0%) were institutionalized.

There were 243 households, out of which 74 (30.5%) had children under the age of 18 living in them, 88 (36.2%) were opposite-sex married couples living together, 30 (12.3%) had a female householder with no husband present, 20 (8.2%) had a male householder with no wife present. There were 22 (9.1%) unmarried opposite-sex partnerships, and 1 (0.4%) same-sex married couples or partnerships. 92 households (37.9%) were made up of individuals, and 19 (7.8%) had someone living alone who was 65 years of age or older. The average household size was 2.11. There were 138 families (56.8% of all households); the average family size was 2.72.

The population was spread out, with 117 people (22.5%) under the age of 18, 31 people (6.0%) aged 18 to 24, 127 people (24.4%) aged 25 to 44, 185 people (35.6%) aged 45 to 64, and 60 people (11.5%) who were 65 years of age or older. The median age was 41.3 years. For every 100 females, there were 94.0 males. For every 100 females age 18 and over, there were 89.2 males.

There were 265 housing units at an average density of 176.7 per square mile (68.2/km^{2}), of which 243 were occupied, of which 134 (55.1%) were owner-occupied, and 109 (44.9%) were occupied by renters. The homeowner vacancy rate was 0.7%; the rental vacancy rate was 0%. 291 people (56.0% of the population) lived in owner-occupied housing units and 221 people (42.5%) lived in rental housing units.

=== 2000 ===
According to the U.S. Census Bureau, at about the year 2000, Miranda's total population was approximately 857. This figure, however, encompasses a much larger geographic area than Miranda proper. The official town population listed on the Miranda welcome sign is significantly lower. Only 5.6% were under 5 years of age, while 75.4% were over 18 and 8.3% over 65. A marginally high 14.7% of those over 18 were civilian veterans. Of those over age 5, 24.6% were of disability status. Majorly of one race (97.3%), Miranda is home to 91.8% White (unspecified origin), 0.5% African American or Black, 2.9% American Indian or Alaskan Native, 0.6% Asian, 0.1% Native Hawaiian or Other Pacific Islander, 1.4% of some other race, and 4.6% Hispanic or Latino. Median household income was $17,422, while median family income was slightly higher at $21,146. Nearly one third (29.4%) of the population as individuals were below the poverty line. Total occupied housing units were 391 out of 505 total units, leaving 114 vacancies. Median value of single-owner occupied homes was $114,400.

== Politics ==
In the state legislature, Miranda is in the 2nd senatorial district, represented by Democrat Mike McGuire, and the 2nd Assembly district, represented by Democrat Chris Rogers.

Federally, Miranda is in California's 2nd congressional district, represented by Democrat Jared Huffman.
