= Garberville, California =

Garberville
- census-designated place
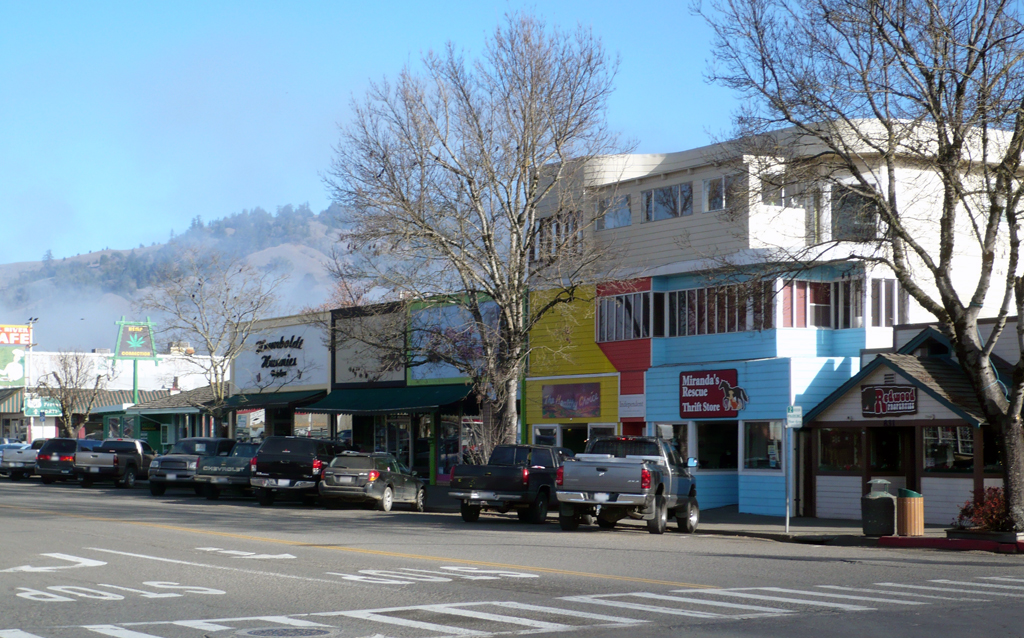
- Downtown Garberville has a retail district.

- Location of Garberville in Humboldt County, California

- Location in California
- Coordinates: 40°6′N 123°48′W
- Country: United States
- State: California
- County: Humboldt

Area
  - Total: 2.737 sq mi (7.089 km^{2})
  - Land: 2.680 sq mi (6.941 km^{2})
  - Water: 0.057 sq mi (0.148 km^{2}) 2.1%
- Elevation: 535 ft (163 m)

Population (2020)
  - Total: 818
  - Density: 305/sq mi (118/km^{2})
- Time zone: UTC-8 (Pacific (PST))
  - Summer (DST): UTC-7 (PDT)
- ZIP Code: 95542
- Area code: 707
- GNIS feature IDs: 224036; 2611433

Garberville is a census-designated place in Humboldt County, California, United States. It is located on the South Fork of the Eel River 52 miles (84 km) south-southeast of Eureka, at an elevation of 535 feet (163 m). The population was 818 at the 2020 United States census. It is approximately 200 miles (320 km) north of San Francisco, California, and within a fifteen-minute drive to Humboldt Redwoods State Park and a sixty-minute drive to Eureka, the county seat. Garberville is the primary town in the area known as the Mateel Region, consisting of parts of the Mattole and Eel River watersheds in southern Humboldt and northern Mendocino counties.

== History ==
Prior to recorded history, the area was populated by southern Sinkyone people. According to notes by Goddard based on local Sinkyone informants, there was once a village at the current location of Garberville named sebīyedadûñ, translating to "rocks under ... ? ... place".

In 1853, a Spanish explorer, Antone Garcia, settled in the area near Town Gulch, which runs through modern-day Garberville. The first post office in Garberville opened in 1874. Jacob C. Garber, the town postmaster, later named the town after himself in 1879.

Timber was a major component of the economy before marijuana.

Marijuana began to be grown and sold in the area in the 1970s, initially by hippies among friends. The mild climate, generous rainfall and well-drained soil of the area makes it an ideal environment for marijuana cultivation, and it became rampant in the south slopes and valleys nearby. The business grew to become a major product part of the economy, exceeding even the Humboldt County timber harvest.

Garberville was recognized as the "center" of the Emerald Triangle, which is a region responsible for 30-40% of California's cannabis production.

The New York Times characterized the town's economic history as of 1988 as "a cycle of boom and bust". The Campaign Against Marijuana Planting (CAMP) program of the Federal Drug Enforcement Administration in 1983 used Garberville as a staging area for a force of 600 officers and a number of helicopters and light planes. Persistent civil rights violations occurred, including rural homes being invaded without authorization, according to a lawsuit at the time. By 1987 a major recession had occurred in the town due to the 5-year police crackdown.

The town recovered. There is a Cannabis College in Garberville, and the town was called "the marijuana heartland of the U.S." by BBC News in 2011.

The local economy has crashed due to the decline in the cannabis market for small growers caused by cannabis legalization. Many businesses lie empty or boarded up. Pot prices have crashed by 95% in California since legalization due to production at an industrial scale. Additionally, regulations are expensive and strict, and pot farmers are not allowed to sell directly to consumers. In Southern Humboldt, the dense forest and long, winding roads useful for evading law enforcement are now sources of cost for legal businesses.

Town leaders largely plan to focus on tourism rather than try to reignite the marijuana industry.

== Geography ==
Garberville is located at 40°06′01″N 123°47′42″W. The town is stretched out in a small, forested valley bisected by U.S. Route 101, at an elevation of 535 feet (163 m). The nearby King's Peak rises to 4,087 feet (1,246 m).

The Garberville Fault is to the southwest and the Dean Creek fault is to the northeast. The Garberville fault trends south-southeast towards Laytonville, where it connects with the Maacama fault zone. Most of the Garberville sediments are Miocene, and the youngest sediments are probably early Pleistocene.

=== Climate ===
The Köppen Climate Classification subtype for this climate is Csb (Mediterranean climate), characterized by cold, rainy winters and hot, dry summers.

Climate data for Garberville, California
Month	Jan	Feb	Mar	Apr	May	Jun	Jul	Aug	Sep	Oct	Nov	Dec	Year
Mean daily maximum °F (°C)	50 (10)	55 (13)	60 (16)	64 (18)	71 (22)	78 (26)	86 (30)	87 (31)	83 (28)	70 (21)	56 (13)	49 (9)	67 (19)
Mean daily minimum °F (°C)	37 (3)	38 (3)	39 (4)	41 (5)	45 (7)	50 (10)	53 (12)	53 (12)	49 (9)	45 (7)	41 (5)	37 (3)	44 (7)
Average precipitation inches (mm)	13.2 (340)	10.3 (260)	8.9 (230)	4.5 (110)	1.9 (48)	0.6 (15)	0.1 (2.5)	0.4 (10)	0.9 (23)	3.9 (99)	9.6 (240)	13.7 (350)	68 (1,700)
Source: Weatherbase

== Demographics ==
Historical population
Census	Pop.	Note	%±
1880	48		—
2010	913		—
2020	818		−10.4%
US Census U.S. Census 1880-1980, 1860–1870 1880-1890; 1900 1910 1920; 1930 1940 1950; 1960 1970 1980; 1990 2000 2010

Garberville first appeared as a census designated place in the 2010 U.S. census.

Race and Ethnicity
Racial and ethnic composition	2010	2020
White (non-Hispanic)	85.76%	74.82%
Hispanic or Latino (of any race)	5.91%	10.39%
Two or more races (non-Hispanic)	1.97%	7.7%
Asian (non-Hispanic)	1.75%	2.44%
Native American (non-Hispanic)	3.18%	2.08%
Other (non-Hispanic)	0.11%	2.08%
Black or African American (non-Hispanic)	1.31%	0.24%
Pacific Islander (non-Hispanic)	0.0%	0.24%

Garberville had a population of 818 in 2020.

There were 396 households, out of which 59 (14.9%) had children under the age of 18 living in them, 104 (26.3%) were married-couple households, 31 (7.8%) were cohabiting couple households, 131 (33.1%) had a female householder with no partner present, and 130 (32.8%) had a male householder with no partner present. 196 households (49.5%) were one person, and 81 (20.5%) were one person aged 65 or older. The average household size was 2.00. There were 165 families (41.7% of all households).

The age distribution was 135 people (16.5%) under the age of 18, 47 people (5.7%) aged 18 to 24, 250 people (30.6%) aged 25 to 44, 205 people (25.1%) aged 45 to 64, and 181 people (22.1%) who were 65 years of age or older.

There were 456 housing units at an average density of 170.1 units per square mile (65.7 units/km^{2}), of which 396 (86.8%) were occupied. Of these, 212 (53.5%) were owner-occupied, and 184 (46.5%) were occupied by renters.

== Culture and media ==
Reggae on the River, an annual music festival, is held near Garberville. Nearby, the 1925 Tudor Revival Benbow Inn is on the National Register of Historic Places.

The Ganjier program is located in Humboldt County which serves to train people in the art of cannabis assessment much like a sommelier in wine. Because of their program over 150 people travel to the Garberville area to visit farms, learn about assessing cannabis, and most important; they learn about regenerative farming and the community that still remains.

The town has an annual rodeo, the 68th occurrence of which happened in 2025.

Garberville is home to the weekly Redwood Times, run by Media News Group as a sister publication of the daily Times-Standard from Eureka. A second weekly, the locally owned Humboldt Independent, was founded in 1997 and closed in 2024. Redwood Community Radio, KMUD, broadcasts from Garberville at 91.1 FM.

== Government ==
=== Politics ===
In the state legislature, Garberville is in the 2nd senatorial district, represented by Democrat Mike McGuire, and the 2nd Assembly district, represented by Democrat Chris Rogers.

Federally, Garberville is in California's 2nd congressional district, represented by Democrat Jared Huffman.

=== Incorporation attempts ===
A proposal to incorporate Garberville as a city was dropped after county supervisors declined to form a Municipal Advisory Committee due to concerns over the associated costs. A group of local residents once attempted to qualify a "Sequoia County" initiative to secede from both Humboldt and Mendocino County with Garberville as the new county seat, although the campaign ended without gathering enough signatures. A local chapter of the Green Party was formed in 2006.

== Infrastructure ==
=== Transportation ===
U.S. Route 101 bypasses the town, with exits 639 and 642 at Garberville and Redway, respectively.

Humboldt Transit Authority serves from Garberville as far north as Trinidad.

The Amtrak Thruway 7 bus provides daily connections to/from Garberville (with a curbside stop at 924 Redwood Drive), Martinez to the south, and Arcata to the north. Additional Amtrak connections are available from Martinez station.

Garberville Airport is a public airport located 2 miles (3.2 km) southwest of town.

=== Utilities ===
Garberville's ZIP Code is 95542. The community is inside area code 707.

The Garberville Fire Protection District, has three engines and a utility truck, self-contained breathing apparatuses and radios. The Garberville Water Company supplies drinking water to residents and maintains 27 fire hydrants on its water lines. The Garberville Sanitary District is not the same as the water company, but provides sewers in the core of the fire district. Some releases of water have contained one or more toxins.

=== Health care ===
The Jerold Phelps Community Hospital is administered by the Southern Humboldt Community Healthcare District.

Garberville recently added a local pharmacy at the top of Sprowl Creek Road and they are working on adding a clinic at the same location.

Redwoods Rural provides health and dental care to local residents.

=== Education ===
The Southern Humboldt Unified School District was created from 19 separate school districts in 1948 and currently serves about 800 students in an area of 745 square miles (1,930 km^{2}). The district has five elementary, one middle school, one high school and one learning center.

- Redway School
- Whitethorn School
- Agnes Johnson School
- Casterlin School
- Ettersburg School
- Miranda Junior High School
- South Fork High School
- Osprey Learning Center

== Notable person ==
- Major League Baseball player Marshall Brant was born in Garberville.

== See also ==
- Avenue of the Giants
- Eel River Athapaskan traditional narratives
- Emerald City, California
