= Weott, California =

- unincorporated community census-designated place
- Location in California
- Coordinates: 40°19′19″N 123°55′18″W
- Country: United States
- State: California
- County: Humboldt

Area
  - Total: 0.770 sq mi (1.995 km^{2})
  - Land: 0.751 sq mi (1.946 km^{2})
  - Water: 0.019 sq mi (0.049 km^{2}) 2.44%
- Elevation: 330 ft (100 m)

Population (2020)
  - Total: 219
  - Density: 291/sq mi (113/km^{2})
- Time zone: UTC-8 (Pacific (PST))
  - Summer (DST): UTC-7 (PDT)
- ZIP Code: 95571
- Area code: 707
- GNIS feature IDs: 237419; 2583075

Weott is an unincorporated community in Humboldt County, California, United States. It is located 233 miles (375 km) north of San Francisco and 25 miles (40 km) due east of the Pacific Ocean. Lower Weott is situated at an elevation of 330 feet (100 m) along the Avenue of the Giants scenic highway and in the flood plain of the South Fork of the Eel River. The population was 219 at the 2020 census. For statistical purposes, the United States Census Bureau has defined Weott as a census-designated place (CDP).

Weott is not related to Camp Weeott, a fishing village, which was established 37 miles (60 km) northwest of Weott, near Ferndale, circa 1925, and destroyed in a 1955 flood.

== History ==
The town of Weott is believed to be named after a sub-grouping of the Wishosk people who lived at the delta of the Eel River 37 miles (60 km) northwest of present-day Weott. The Wishosk word for that area and the people who lived there was wíyat. The general name for this group is now Wiyot. The town of Weott is beyond the bounds of the areas known to have been utilized or inhabited by the Wiyot. In 1849, when whites arrived looking for new supply routes to the Trinity gold mines, the Sinkyone peoples were living in the area. The Wiyot were further north and currently occupy the Table Bluff Reservation outside Loleta. Indian Agent Redick McKee's 1851 expedition brought a rush of homestead filings. Native groups militated against this. The resulting conflicts led to the establishment of organized vigilante committees such as the Volunteer Company of Dragoons and continued through at least the 1870s.

Before 1925, Weott had been known informally as Helm's Mill or Helm's Camp. Helm's Camp set up where redwood ties were being made for the railroad being constructed along the Eel River. It was later known as McKee's Mill (named for Ernest McKee, who operated a shingle mill just east of lower Weott, but was lost in the flood of 1964. When the residents submitted a request to the United States Postal Service for a post office in that year, however, they had to decide on a definitive name. At least one source records that the residents were required to do this because there was already a town named McKee in California, but this appears to not be true. Another source says that a naming contest led to the name Weott, yet another that the USPOD chose the name from several submitted. The ZIP Code is 95571, with four-digit suffixes tied to post office box numbers. There is no home delivery in Weott. Weott is in area code 707.

== Climate ==
Because of its proximity to the ocean and its position in the shadow of 3,380-foot-high (1,030 m) Grasshopper Peak, Weott has an intense rainy season lasting from November through May. Locals report typical annual accumulations of 79 inches (2,000 mm), though the range is 28 to 98 inches (700 to 2,500 mm). Due to its moist climate, the town is surrounded on most sides by redwoods. Though most of the redwoods are second growth, the adjacent Humboldt Redwoods State Park has nearly 17,000 acres (7,000 ha) of old growth and includes Rockefeller Forest, the largest contiguous stand of old growth redwoods still in existence. Weott is located close to Giant Tree, a 354-foot-tall (108 m) redwood, and the Dyerville Giant, a 371-foot-tall (113 m) redwood that toppled in 1991. In summer, early morning and late evening fog typically protect the area from temperature extremes. Though daytime highs occasionally reach into the high 30 °C (86 °F)s, they are more typically below 86 °F (30 °C). Due to a lack of water storage capacity, Weott sometimes suffers from water rationing in the summers.

Climate data for Weott
Month	Jan	Feb	Mar	Apr	May	Jun	Jul	Aug	Sep	Oct	Nov	Dec	Year
Mean daily maximum °F (°C)	54 (12)	56 (13)	59 (15)	63 (17)	68 (20)	74 (23)	81 (27)	81 (27)	81 (27)	72 (22)	59 (15)	53 (12)	67 (19)
Mean daily minimum °F (°C)	39 (4)	39 (4)	41 (5)	42 (6)	46 (8)	49 (9)	53 (12)	53 (12)	50 (10)	45 (7)	42 (6)	39 (4)	45 (7)
Average precipitation inches (mm)	10.4 (260)	8.4 (210)	7.7 (200)	4.3 (110)	2.0 (51)	0.7 (18)	0.1 (2.5)	0.1 (2.5)	0.6 (15)	3.0 (76)	6.9 (180)	11.1 (280)	55.3 (1,405)
Source: U.S.Prism

=== Flooding ===
See also Christmas Week flood of 1955 and Christmas flood of 1964

Though Weott had been hit by a flood in 1930, its recent history is shaped by two later major floods. In December 1955, lower Weott was partially destroyed when the South Fork of the Eel River overflowed its banks. The town largely re-built, but in December 1964, a Pineapple Express, a phenomenon in which a warm mass of moist Pacific air, a flow of cold air from an Alaskan high, a low pressure trough off the coast and a strong westerly air flow with gusts up to 50 mph (80 km/h), created the greatest flood in the recorded history of California's North Coast. The storm was so intense that it destroyed 26 U.S. Geological Survey stream gauges. As a result, much of the flood data comes from qualitative reports and post-flood estimates. Other northern California rivers, such as the Russian, Eel, Klamath and Rogue Rivers, also rose to unprecedented heights. Rainfall totals as high as 30 inches (760 mm) were recorded for the nine-day period of the storm and 11 inches (290 mm) for the 24-hour period between December 21 and 22. The South Fork of the Eel River is estimated to have peaked at nearly 200,000 cubic feet per second (5,700 m^{3}/s) at a station 12 miles (20 km) south of Weott, nearly 2,800 cubic feet per second (80 m^{3}/s) greater than the 1955 flood. Tens of small towns were inundated. One of the worst hit was Weott.

Due to the 1955 and 1964 floods, nearly all residents now live in the hills above the flood plain, mostly at elevations of 390–660 feet (120–200 m). The greater area of Weott encompasses the Bull Creek, Dyerville, South Fork, Camp Grant and Burlington areas. Weott's local services are run by the Weott Community Service District, which controls the town's sewage treatment facility and water supply. The town's water originally came from a property 0.93 miles (1.5 km) east of Weott. It now comes from a spring west of town, across the Eel River. The California State Parks has tried to provide Weott with alternatives to the spring, which is on State Parks land, including constructing a well on the Weott side of the river in 2003. This well had too much sediment, though, and was not usable. The WCSD has surveyed lands in the surrounding watershed but has yet to find an alternative water source.

== Demographics ==
Historical population
Census	Pop.	Note	%±
2010	288		—
2020	219		−24.0%
U.S. Decennial Census; 1860–1870 1880-1890; 1900 1910 1920; 1930 1940 1950; 1960 1970 1980; 1990 2000 2010

Weott first appeared as a census designated place in the 2010 U.S. census.

The 2020 United States census reported that Weott had a population of 219, all of whom lived in households. The population density was 291.6 inhabitants per square mile (112.6/km^{2}). The racial makeup was 177 (80.8%) White, 0 (0.0%) African American, 5 (2.3%) Native American, 0 (0.0%) Asian, 0 (0.0%) Pacific Islander, 12 (5.5%) from other races, and 25 (11.4%) from two or more races. Hispanic or Latino of any race were 27 persons (12.3%).

There were 104 households, out of which 15 (14.4%) had children under the age of 18 living in them, 13 (12.5%) were married-couple households, 11 (10.6%) were cohabiting couple households, 20 (19.2%) had a female householder with no partner present, and 60 (57.7%) had a male householder with no partner present. 59 households (56.7%) were one person, and 14 (13.5%) were one person aged 65 or older. The average household size was 2.11. There were 31 families (29.8% of all households).

The age distribution was 47 people (21.5%) under the age of 18, 6 people (2.7%) aged 18 to 24, 70 people (32.0%) aged 25 to 44, 60 people (27.4%) aged 45 to 64, and 36 people (16.4%) who were 65 years of age or older. The median age was 41.8 years. There were 126 males and 93 females.

There were 123 housing units at an average density of 163.8 units per square mile (63.2 units/km^{2}), of which 104 (84.6%) were occupied. Of these, 53 (51.0%) were owner-occupied, and 51 (49.0%) were occupied by renters.

== Economy ==
In 1987, long-time resident Velma Childs listed the pre-1955-flood businesses in Weott. These included a candy shop, ice cream shop, two gasoline stations, a laundromat, a bar, two cafes, three restaurants, two auto garages, a Ford dealership, a church, a movie theatre, two grocery stores, a dress shop, a telephone office (to connect callers via party line), a print shop, a chainsaw shop, a sporting goods store, a beauty shop and an apple orchard along a 400-meter stretch of the Avenue of the Giants. She also listed thirteen homes in lower Weott. The 1955 flood destroyed or damaged beyond repair the theatre, two motels, a grocery, a service station, the bar and a restaurant. The other businesses repaired their buildings. After the 1964 flood, only one house was built on the old townsite. Residents and some businesses moved uphill far enough to exist well above any possible future flood waters; the majority did not return. The 1964 flood was famously described by Governor Edmund Brown as a "thousand-year flood," though it has since been rated a 290-year flood. A 36-foot-tall flood marker displays how high the waters rose at their peak on December 24.

The former economic base for Weott residents—primary and secondary lumber industries—has largely disappeared. Some locals commute to jobs in nearby communities or work with government entities such as the school district or Humboldt Redwoods State Park. Retirees also comprise a significant part of the community.

== Arts and culture ==
=== Events ===
Since 1972, the Avenue of the Giants Marathon has taken place on the first Sunday in May, starting 4 kilometres (2.5 mi) north of Weott at the Dyerville Bridge. It has included a 10 km race since 1993 and a 21.1 km race since 2002. The Humboldt Redwoods Marathon has taken place on the second Sunday of October since 1976. It now also includes 5 km and 21.1 km races. The 21.1 kilometres (13.1 mi) race has served as the Pacific Association of the United States Track and Field Association championship for several years. There is a large spaghetti feed at Weott's Milligan Hall for the runners before the races. Since 1951, Weott has also been host to the Southern Humboldt Garden Club Flower Show. It is currently held at the Agnes J. Johnson Elementary School on the fourth Sunday in May. Local gardeners enter prized roses and other flowers from their gardens for a chance to win ribbons and prizes. The show also includes plant sales, food and other crafts. There are various seasonal activities at the Humboldt Redwoods State Park headquarters, including guided nature walks and Christmas tree lightings.

== Government ==
The Town of Weott has a special service district (Weott Community Services District) to provide water and sewer connections within its borders.

In the state legislature, Weott is in the 2nd senatorial district, represented by Democrat Mike McGuire, and the 2nd Assembly district, represented by Democrat Chris Rogers.

Federally, it is in California's 2nd congressional district, represented by Democrat Jared Huffman.

== Infrastructure ==
=== Facilities ===
Weott does not have many commercial services since the general store, which first opened in 1919, last closed in 2003. The town has a post office, a Cal Fire station and the public, tuition-free, TK-9 Agnes J. Johnson Charter School. The Charter School will serve all students in grades TK-12 by 2025. The Charter School, authorized by Humboldt County Board of Education, draws from several communities in the area. The Cal Fire station was torn down in 2010 and rebuilt. There is one community center, Milligan Hall, named after a long-time resident. This building was the town’s schoolhouse from 1923 to 1954 and later a Legion Hall. At least once the surrounding land was used as a Cal Fire tent camp, presumably for firefighting. At one time, the town had two churches, Faith Chapel Assembly of God and the non-denominational Weott Christian Church. The Weott Christian Church, which was established in 1954, has had its non-profit status suspended until it comes into compliance with the California Franchise Tax Board or the Office of the Secretary of State. The Faith Chapel is still functioning.

Weott Center, located at the off-ramp of Highway 101, was for many years home to the Sequoia Hotel, a restaurant, a Union 76 gasoline station and a company that made redwood curios. None of these businesses have survived. 1.9 miles (3 km) south of Weott is Burlington Campground, which also hosts the Humboldt Redwoods State Park visitor center. This is one of several campgrounds in the Humboldt Redwoods State Park, but is the only campground open year-round. The closest commercial services to Weott are in Myers Flat, 6.2 miles (10 km) south. The closest major shopping facilities are in Garberville (22 miles; 35 km south) and Fortuna (28 miles; 45 km north).

Until 2010, Weott had access only to dial-up internet service. In 2010, high speed internet access became available in the town.

=== Transportation ===
Two roads provide access to Weott: State Highway 254 (the Avenue of the Giants) and U.S. Highway 101, both of which are oriented north–south. Weott can be reached from the Avenue of the Giants, but has not had a significant presence on it since the 1964 flood. Highway 101, which was built in 1962, goes through the upper portion of the town and has a dedicated off-ramp and on-ramp in both directions. Though both roads lead through Humboldt Redwoods State Park, the Avenue of the Giants is a scenic route popular with RV, motorcycle, and bicycle enthusiasts. During the summer months there are several accessible swimming holes along the Avenue near Weott. There is a temporary summer pedestrian bridge put in at Burlington campground and another 1.2 miles (2 km) north at Women's Federation Grove. Weott is surrounded by old homesteads that are now part of the State Park. Many of these homesteads still have remnants of orchards and some have remnants of the old structures.
