= Pepperwood, California =

Unincorporated community in California, United States

Pepperwood
- Unincorporated community
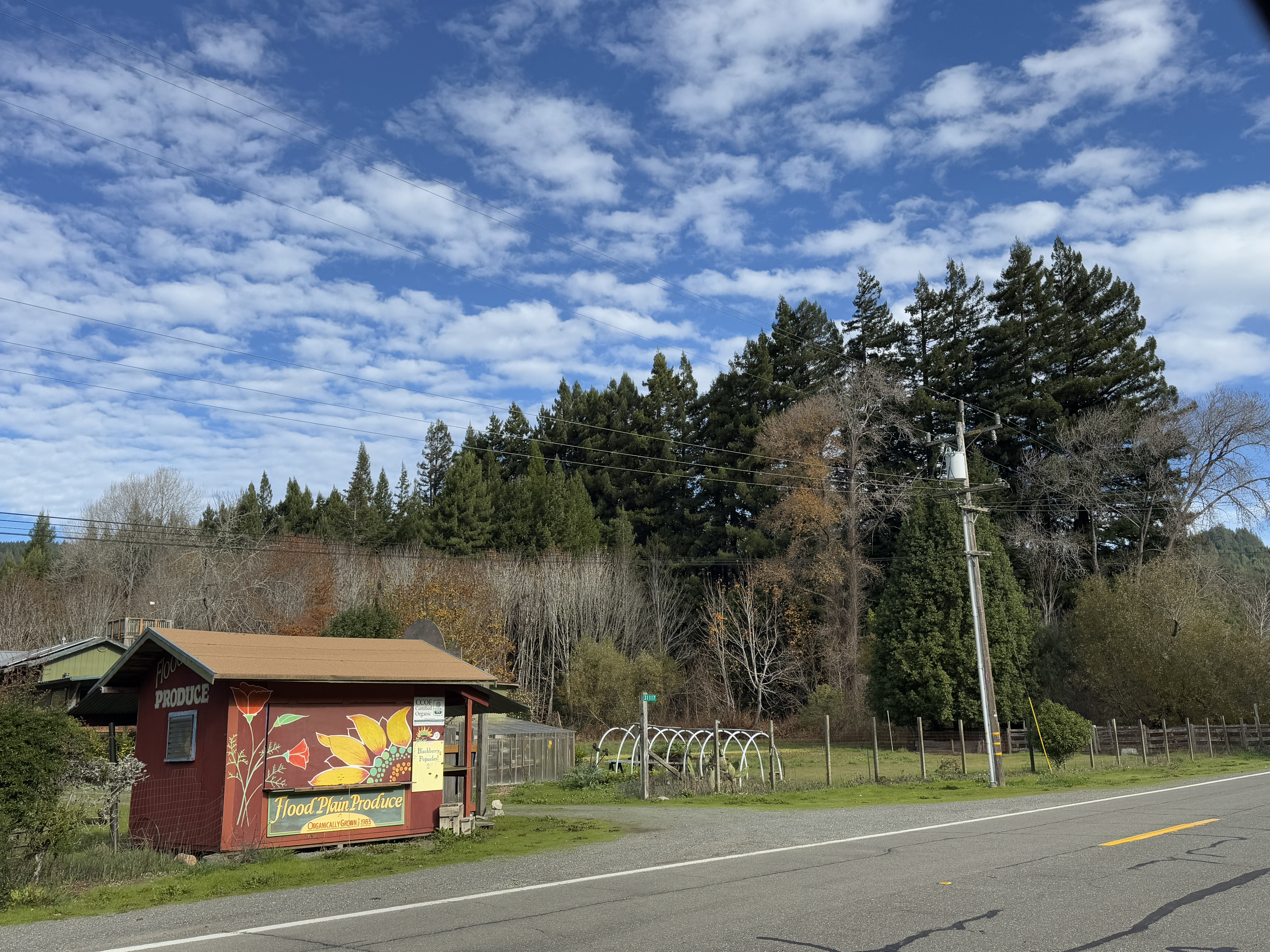
- A farm stand along the Avenue of the Giants in Pepperwood in December 2024.

- Location in California Pepperwood (the United States)
- Coordinates: 40°26′45″N 123°59′34″W
- Country: United States
- State: California
- County: Humboldt
- Elevation: 115 ft (35 m)

Pepperwood (formerly Barkdull) is an unincorporated community in Humboldt County, California, United States. It is located 3.5 miles (5.6 km) northwest of Redcrest, at an elevation of 115 feet (35 m). Pepperwood is the northernmost community along the Avenue of the Giants. The ZIP Code is 95569. The community is inside area code 707.

A post office operated at Pepperwood from 1887 to 1892 and from 1901 to 1965. After enduring severe flooding in 1955, the town was virtually destroyed by the Christmas flood of 1964. At the time, Pepperwood had some 300 residents and was known as a center for production of farm produce. A few farms and residences remain today.

== Politics ==
In the state legislature, Pepperwood is in the 2nd senatorial district, represented by Democrat Mike McGuire, and the 2nd Assembly district, represented by Democrat Chris Rogers.

Federally, Pepperwood is in California's 2nd congressional district, represented by Democrat Jared Huffman.
