= Stafford, Humboldt County, California =

Unincorporated community in California, United States

Stafford
- Unincorporated community
- Location in California Stafford (the United States)
- Coordinates: 40°27′14″N 124°03′13″W
- Country: United States
- State: California
- County: Humboldt
- Elevation: 138 ft (42 m)

Stafford (formerly, Brown's Mill and Brown's Camp) is an unincorporated community in Humboldt County, California, United States. It is located on the south bank of the Eel River, 3 miles (4.8 km) southeast of Scotia, at an elevation of 138 feet (42 m).

The town was founded in 1895 or 1896; the name honors Judge Cyrus G. Stafford. The name "Brown" honors Percy Brown, lumber mill owner. An attraction in the area was the Stafford Inn, a converted bunk house from Brown's mill. The inn was destroyed in a flood in 1964.
