= Redcrest, California =

Redcrest
- census-designated place
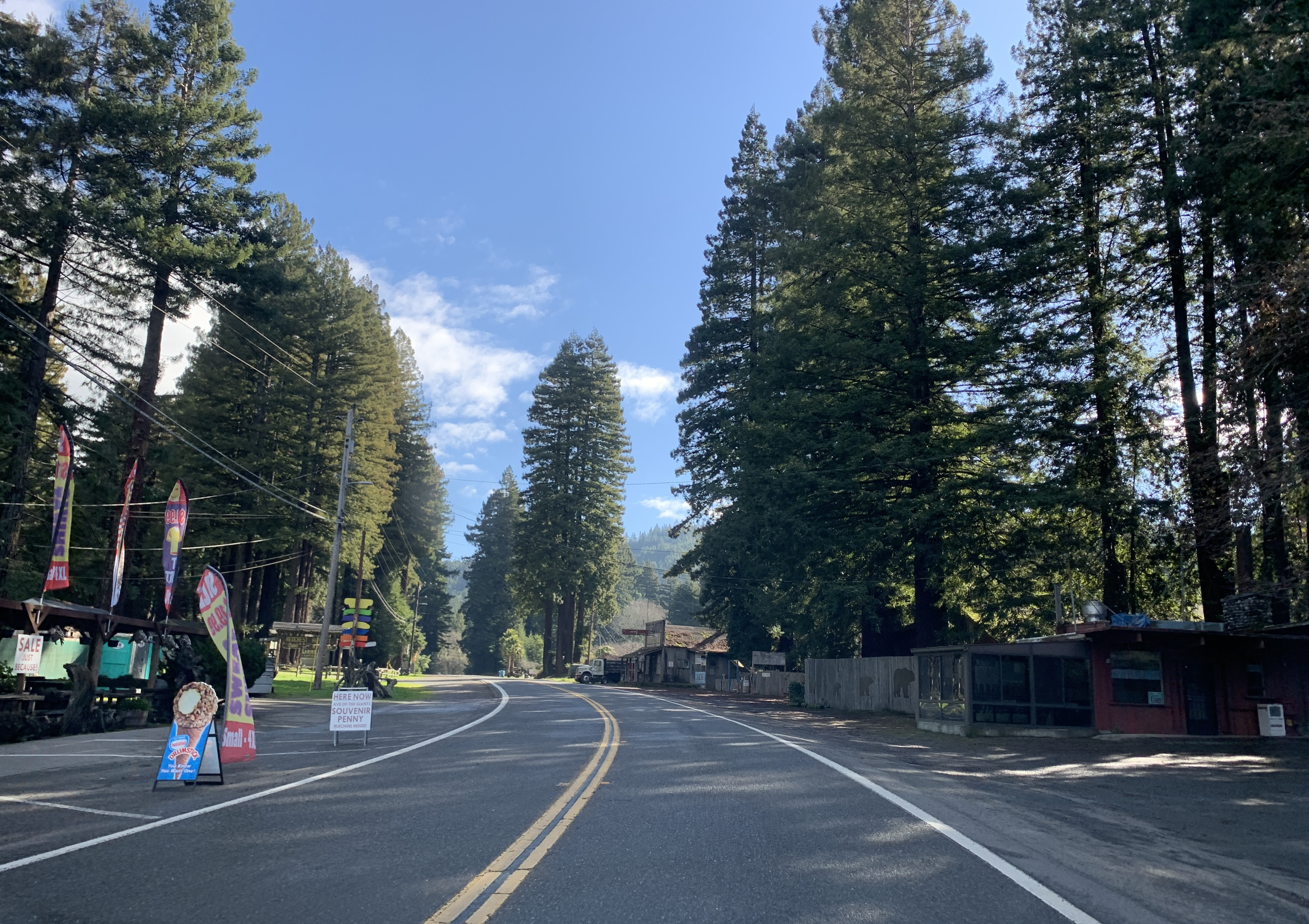

- Location in California
- Coordinates: 40°24′02″N 123°57′00″W
- Country: United States
- State: California
- County: Humboldt

Area
  - Total: 0.598 sq mi (1.549 km^{2})
  - Land: 0.598 sq mi (1.549 km^{2})
  - Water: 0 sq mi (0 km^{2}) 0%
- Elevation: 377 ft (115 m)

Population (2020)
  - Total: 61
  - Density: 100/sq mi (39/km^{2})
- Time zone: UTC-8 (Pacific (PST))
  - Summer (DST): UTC-7 (PDT)
- ZIP Code: 95569
- Area code: 707
- GNIS feature IDs: 1659487; 2628781

Redcrest is a census-designated place in Humboldt County, California, United States. It is located 5.5 miles (8.9 km) north of Weott, at an elevation of 377 feet (115 m). The population was 61 at the 2020 census.

The Redcrest post office was established in 1965.

The greater Redcrest area includes the Holmes flat, Englewood and Larabee areas.

Redcrest is located along the Avenue of the Giants. The ZIP Code is 95569. The community is inside area code 707.

== Demographics ==
Historical population
Census	Pop.	Note	%±
2010	89		—
2020	61		−31.5%
U.S. Decennial Census; 1860–1870 1880-1890; 1900 1910 1920; 1930 1940 1950; 1960 1970 1980; 1990 2000 2010

Redcrest first appeared as a census designated place in the 2010 U.S. census.

The 2020 United States census reported that Redcrest had a population of 61. The population density was 102.0 inhabitants per square mile (39.4/km^{2}). The racial makeup of Redcrest was 56 (92%) White, 3 (5%) Native American, and 2 (3%) from two or more races. Hispanic or Latino of any race were 0 persons (0.0%).

There were 28 households, out of which 6 (21%) had children under the age of 18 living in them, 14 (50%) were married-couple households, 3 (11%) were cohabiting couple households, 3 (11%) had a female householder with no partner present, and 8 (29%) had a male householder with no partner present. Three households (11%) were one person, and two (7%) were one person aged 65 or older. The average household size was 2.18. There were 21 families (75% of all households).

The age distribution was 13 people (21%) under the age of 18, 4 people (7%) aged 18 to 24, 18 people (30%) aged 25 to 44, 14 people (23%) aged 45 to 64, and 12 people (20%) who were 65 years of age or older. The median age was 39.8 years. There were 33 males and 28 females.

There were 32 housing units at an average density of 53.5 units per square mile (20.7 units/km^{2}), of which 28 (88%) were occupied. Of these, 14 (50%) were owner-occupied, and 14 (50%) were occupied by renters.

== Politics ==
In the state legislature, Redcrest is in the 2nd senatorial district, represented by Democrat Mike McGuire, and the 2nd Assembly district, represented by Democrat Chris Rogers.

Federally, Redcrest is in California's 2nd congressional district, represented by Democrat Jared Huffman.
