= National Register of Historic Places listings in Mendocino County, California =

Location of Mendocino County in California

This is a list of the National Register of Historic Places listings in Mendocino County, California.

This is intended to be a complete list of the properties and districts on the National Register of Historic Places in Mendocino County, California, United States. Latitude and longitude coordinates are provided for many National Register properties and districts; these locations may be seen together in an online map.

There are 45 properties and districts listed on the National Register in the county, including 1 National Historic Landmark.

This National Park Service list is complete through NPS recent listings posted September 4, 2026.

== Current listings ==
	Name on the Register	Image	Date listed	Location	City or town	Description
1	Albion River Bridge	Albion River Bridge	July 31, 2017 (#100001383)	Mile markers 43.7-44.0 on CA 1; 39°13′36″N 123°46′09″W	Albion	
2	Arena Cove Historic District	Arena Cove Historic District	September 13, 1990 (#90001363)	Arena Cove; 38°54′54″N 123°42′28″W	Point Arena	
3	Dr. Raymond Babcock House		August 19, 2004 (#04000620)	96 S. Humboldt St. 39°24′45″N 123°21′07″W	Willits	
4	Bear Harbor Landing Historical and Archaeological District		June 8, 2023 (#100009041)	Address Restricted	Whitethorn	
5	Buckridge Ranch House		September 13, 1990 (#90001359)	On the Garcia River near Buckridge Rd. 38°55′35″N 123°37′33″W	Point Arena	
6	Con Creek School	Con Creek School	October 18, 1979 (#79000498)	2 miles (3.2 km) north of Boonville on State Route 128; 39°01′47″N 123°23′07″W	Boonville	Also known as the Little Red Schoolhouse, the Con Creek School is a schoolhouse built in the Greek Revival style by J.D. Ball in 1891. Used as a classroom for eight grade levels for 50 years, it was trimmed down to only 7th and 8th grades by 1941. In 1958 its use changed again to that of a kindergarten, and remained so until 1979, when it was donated to the local historical society. The Little Red Schoolhouse is located near the community of Boonville
7	Jerome B. Ford House	Jerome B. Ford House	June 23, 2010 (#10000394)	735 Main St. 39°18′19″N 123°47′50″W	Mendocino	
8	FROLIC (brig)	FROLIC (brig)	May 16, 1991 (#91000565)	Northeast of Pt. Cabrillo; 39°21′18″N 123°49′15″W	Caspar	
9	O. W. Getchell House	O. W. Getchell House	October 3, 1980 (#80000819)	State Route 1; 38°47′48″N 123°34′05″W	Anchor Bay	Located in the community of Anchor Bay, the Getchell house was built by Osgood W. Getchel c.1870. A prominent location on a bluff and near a trade route established the Getchell house as a popular landmark for both land and sea travelers. The Getchell house was also one of the only wood structures to survive the 1906 earthquake.
10	E. P. and Clara Gillmore House	E. P. and Clara Gillmore House	September 13, 1990 (#90001355)	40 Mill St. 38°55′04″N 123°41′25″W	Point Arena	The Gillmore house is one of the few houses in Point Arena that was designed in an architectural style, specifically Second Empire. Built in the 1870s, the house was the residence of E.P. Gillmore, a one time county supervisor and the owner of a local livery stable and general store.
11	Sid Groshon House	Sid Groshon House	September 13, 1990 (#90001356)	50 Mill St. 38°54′32″N 123°41′24″W	Point Arena	A small Victorian cottage, and the only Queen Anne style home in Point Arena.
12	Held–Poage House	Held–Poage House	January 7, 1988 (#87002292)	603 W. Perkins St. 39°08′55″N 123°12′40″W	Ukiah	A Queen Anne Victorian house located near downtown Ukiah, the building was the home of William D.L. and Ethel Poage Held, who took residence in 1903. William D.L. Held numerous positions in public service, including serving in the California State Legislature and as the Mayor of the City of Ukiah. In 1969, the building was donated to the Mendocino County Historical Society by William P. Held and now serves as a research library.
13	Charles Hofman House	Charles Hofman House	September 30, 1993 (#93001022)	308 S. School St. 39°08′54″N 123°12′26″W	Ukiah	A Stick-Eastlake style Victorian home that sits just blocks south of the Mendocino County courthouse in downtown Ukiah.
14	Hoyt–Scott House	Hoyt–Scott House	September 13, 1990 (#90001354)	10 Riverside Dr. 38°54′40″N 123°41′28″W	Point Arena	
15	Italian Hotel	Italian Hotel	September 13, 1990 (#90001361)	105 Main St. 38°54′25″N 123°42′08″W	Point Arena	A Classical Revival style home built in the early 19th century for the owner of local brewery. The Italian Hotel has the dubious distinction of being used as a brothel in the small red-light district of Point Arena during World War II.
16	Iverson House	Iverson House	September 13, 1990 (#90001353)	40 Iverson Ave. 38°54′29″N 123°41′33″W	Point Arena	A small Greek Revival style house built in Point Arena in 1875 for the local Iverson family.
17	Billy Ketchum House	Billy Ketchum House	September 13, 1990 (#90001358)	10 Scott Pl. 38°54′42″N 123°41′28″W	Point Arena	A bungalow/Craftsman home built for the local manager of the Point Arena Hot Springs in the early 20th century.
18	Larsen Family House		October 5, 1995 (#95001153)	84 State St. 39°24′49″N 123°21′09″W	Willits	
19	Lovejoy Homestead		April 26, 1978 (#78000719)	North of Branscomb; 39°44′52″N 123°38′00″W	Branscomb	
20	Main Street Historic Commercial District	Main Street Historic Commercial District	September 13, 1990 (#90001364)	165-265 Main St. 38°54′35″N 123°41′29″W	Point Arena	Thirty buildings on either side of California State Highway 1 in Point Arena.
21	Manchester Schoolhouse	Manchester Schoolhouse	June 26, 1979 (#79000499)	19750 State Route 1; 38°58′01″N 123°41′10″W	Manchester	
22	Mendocino and Headlands Historic District	Mendocino and Headlands Historic District	July 14, 1971 (#71000165)	Bounded roughly by the Pacific Ocean on the west and south, Little Lake St. on the north, and State Route 1 on the east 39°18′30″N 123°48′23″W	Mendocino	
23	Mendocino Woodlands Recreational Demonstration Area	Mendocino Woodlands Recreational Demonstration Area	September 25, 1997 (#97001262)	11301 Little Lake Rd. 39°19′39″N 123°41′54″W	Mendocino	
24	Milano Hotel		June 23, 1978 (#78000720)	38300 State Route 1, S. 38°46′40″N 123°32′27″W	Gualala	
25	LeGrand Morse House		September 13, 1990 (#90001362)	365 Main St. 38°54′43″N 123°41′32″W	Point Arena	House built c.1870 for LeGrand Morse, a local teacher, clerk, lawyer and legislator. Notable for having killed mother, when he meant to poison his mother, instead.
26	Navarro	Navarro	December 21, 2009 (#09001089)	Navarro Beach Rd. 39°11′38″N 123°45′26″W	Albion	Navarro-by-the-Sea Inn, long-closed, near mouth of Navarro River, which a nonprofit group seeks to preserve and restore.
27	Olinsky Building	Olinsky Building	August 4, 1995 (#95000995)	401 N. Main St. 39°26′45″N 123°48′19″W	Fort Bragg	
28	Palace Hotel	Palace Hotel	October 2, 1979 (#79003458)	272 N. State St. 39°09′04″N 123°12′26″W	Ukiah	
29	Annie Palmer House	Annie Palmer House	September 13, 1990 (#90001357)	284 Main St. 38°54′39″N 123°41′30″W	Point Arena	A small Greek Revival house in Point Arena, named for its notorious one-time owner Annie Palmer. Palmer was a teacher at a local Methodist school until she was convicted of murdering her lover.
30	Point Arena High School	Point Arena High School	September 13, 1990 (#90001365)	200 Lake St. 38°54′53″N 123°41′54″W	Point Arena	
31	Point Arena Light Station	Point Arena Light Station	July 16, 1991 (#90002189)	Lighthouse Rd. 38°57′18″N 123°44′24″W	Point Arena	
32	Point Arena Rancheria Roundhouse		September 13, 1990 (#90001360)	On the Garcia River at the end of Rancheria Rd. 38°57′01″N 123°39′45″W	Point Arena	Dancehouse of Pomo native americans, from c.1905
33	Point Cabrillo Light Station	Point Cabrillo Light Station	September 3, 1991 (#91001092)	45300 Lighthouse Rd. 39°20′53″N 123°49′23″W	Caspar	
34	Point Cabrillo Site		February 23, 1972 (#72000238)	Address Restricted	Pine Grove	
35	Round Valley Flour Mills	Round Valley Flour Mills	November 10, 1980 (#80000820)	Main and Greely Sts. 39°47′35″N 123°14′57″W	Covelo	
36	St. Francis Mission Church		February 3, 2020 (#100004919)	Address Restricted	Hopland vicinity	
37	St. Paul's Methodist Episcopal Church	St. Paul's Methodist Episcopal Church	September 13, 1990 (#90001366)	40 School St. 38°54′50″N 123°41′32″W	Point Arena	
38	Seabiscuit's Stud Barn	Seabiscuit's Stud Barn	January 22, 2014 (#13001108)	16200 N. US 101; 39°19′12″N 123°18′29″W	Willits	
39	Spotswood House	Spotswood House	September 27, 2007 (#07000997)	11820 West Rd. 39°19′46″N 123°07′52″W	Potter Valley	
40	Sun House	Sun House	September 2, 1981 (#81000161)	431 S. Main St. 39°08′51″N 123°12′16″W	Ukiah	
41	Town Creek Archeological Site		May 17, 1976 (#76000498)	Address Restricted	Covelo	
42	Ukiah Main Post Office	Ukiah Main Post Office	May 9, 2012 (#12000266)	224 N. Oak St. 39°09′02″N 123°12′36″W	Ukiah	
43	Weller House	Weller House	July 19, 1976 (#76000499)	524 Stewart St. 39°26′50″N 123°48′25″W	Fort Bragg	Built in Fort Bragg for Horace Weller in 1886, the Weller House is the oldest existing house in the city. Expanded a year later, it came to include three stories with 10 rooms, including a 900 square feet (84 m^{2}) ballroom. It is now a bed & breakfast.
44	Willits Carnegie Library	Willits Carnegie Library	January 7, 1993 (#92001756)	85 E. Commercial St. 39°24′43″N 123°21′09″W	Willits	A Classical Revival building built in 1915 by Dan Deshiell.
45	Willits Depot	Willits Depot	October 20, 1999 (#99001262)	East Commercial St. 39°24′45″N 123°20′59″W	Willits	

== See also ==
- List of National Historic Landmarks in California
- National Register of Historic Places listings in California
- California Historical Landmarks in Mendocino County, California
