= Weller House =

Weller House may refer to:

- Weller House (Fort Bragg, California), listed on the National Register of Historic Places (NRHP)
- Weller House (Chesterton, Indiana), listed on the National Register of Historic Places in Porter County, Indiana
- Bonavita-Weller House, Anchorage, Kentucky, listed on the NRHP in Anchorage, Kentucky
- House of Weller, Louisville, Kentucky, listed on the NRHP in Downtown Louisville, Kentucky

== See also ==
- Weller (disambiguation)
