= Trinidad State Beach =

State beach in Humboldt County, California, United States

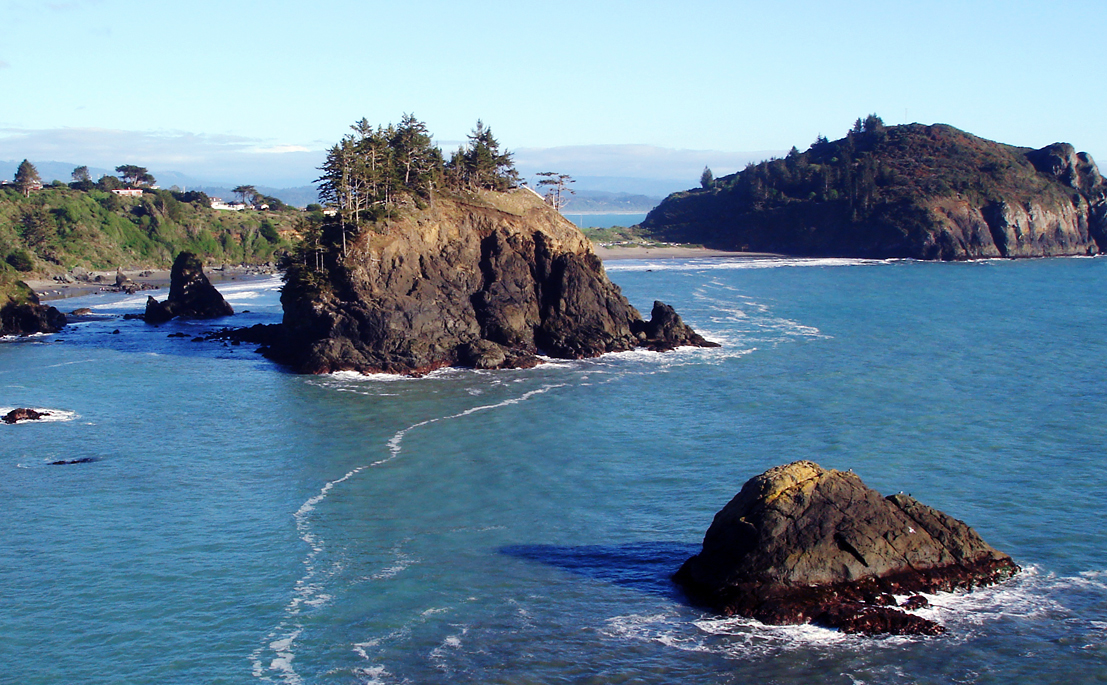

- Location within California Location within the United States
- Location: Humboldt County, California
- Nearest city: Trinidad
- Coordinates: 41°4′0″N 124°9′0″W
- Governing body: California Department of Parks and Recreation

Trinidad State Beach is a state beach 20 miles (30 km) north of Eureka in Humboldt County, California. The offshore rocks are part of the California Coastal National Monument. Colorful tide pools provide specimens to Cal Poly Humboldt's Fred Telonicher Marine Laboratory located in Trinidad.

Nearby parks include Little River State Beach just south of Trinidad and to the north, Sue-meg State Park. The Beach's latitude and longitude are 41.0594 / -124.1420.

== Access ==
This park is accessed from a signposted side road at Trinity Street and Stagecoach Road in the seaside town of Trinidad. The parking lot at Trinidad Bay below Trinidad Head is another popular access point.

== See also ==
- List of beaches in California
- List of California state parks
- Parks in Humboldt County, California
