= San Mateo Rocks =

Uninhabited Californian coastal islands

Coordinates: 33°24′17″N 117°37′01″W

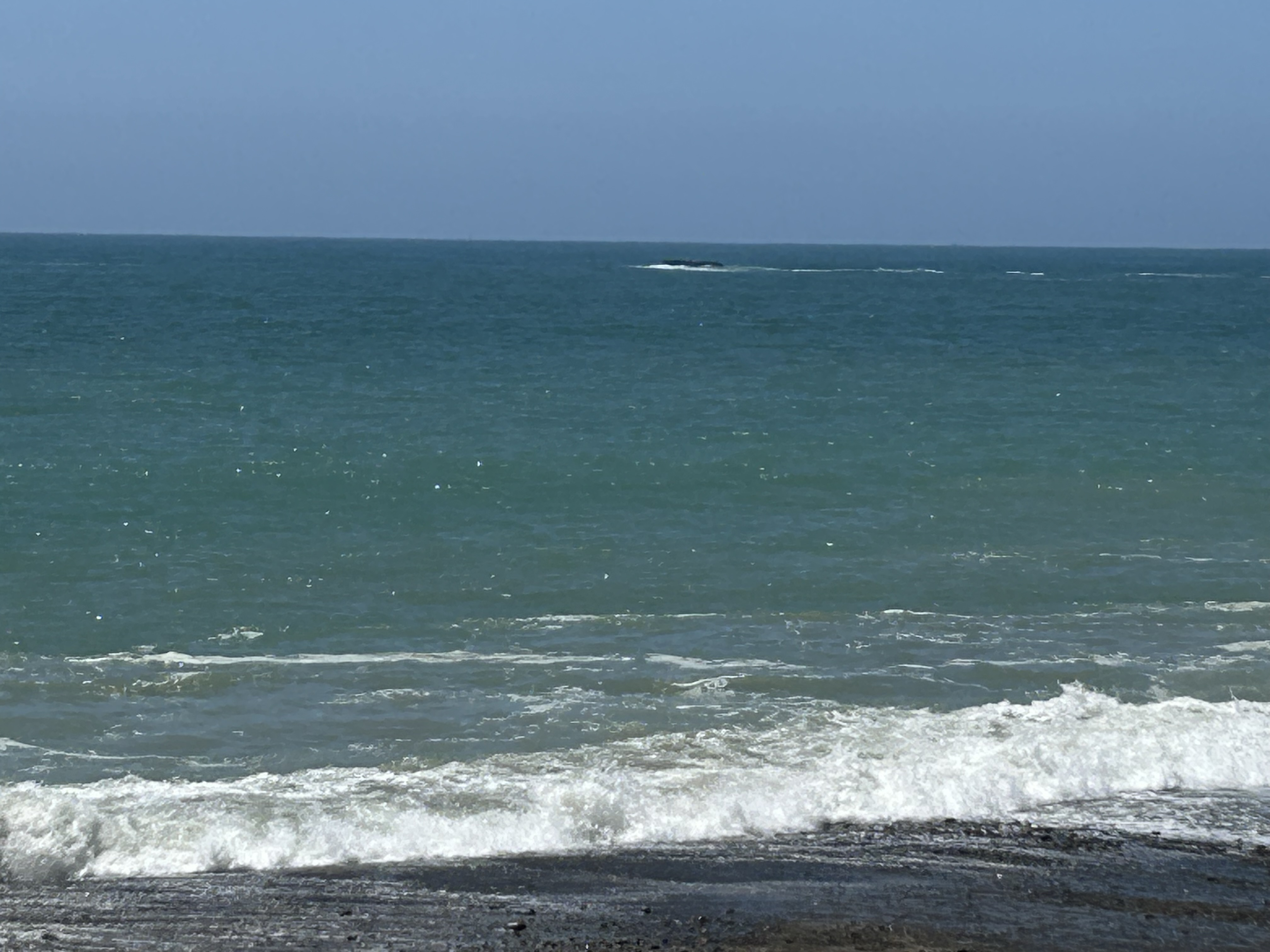
The San Mateo Rocks as seen from the San Clemente State Beach.

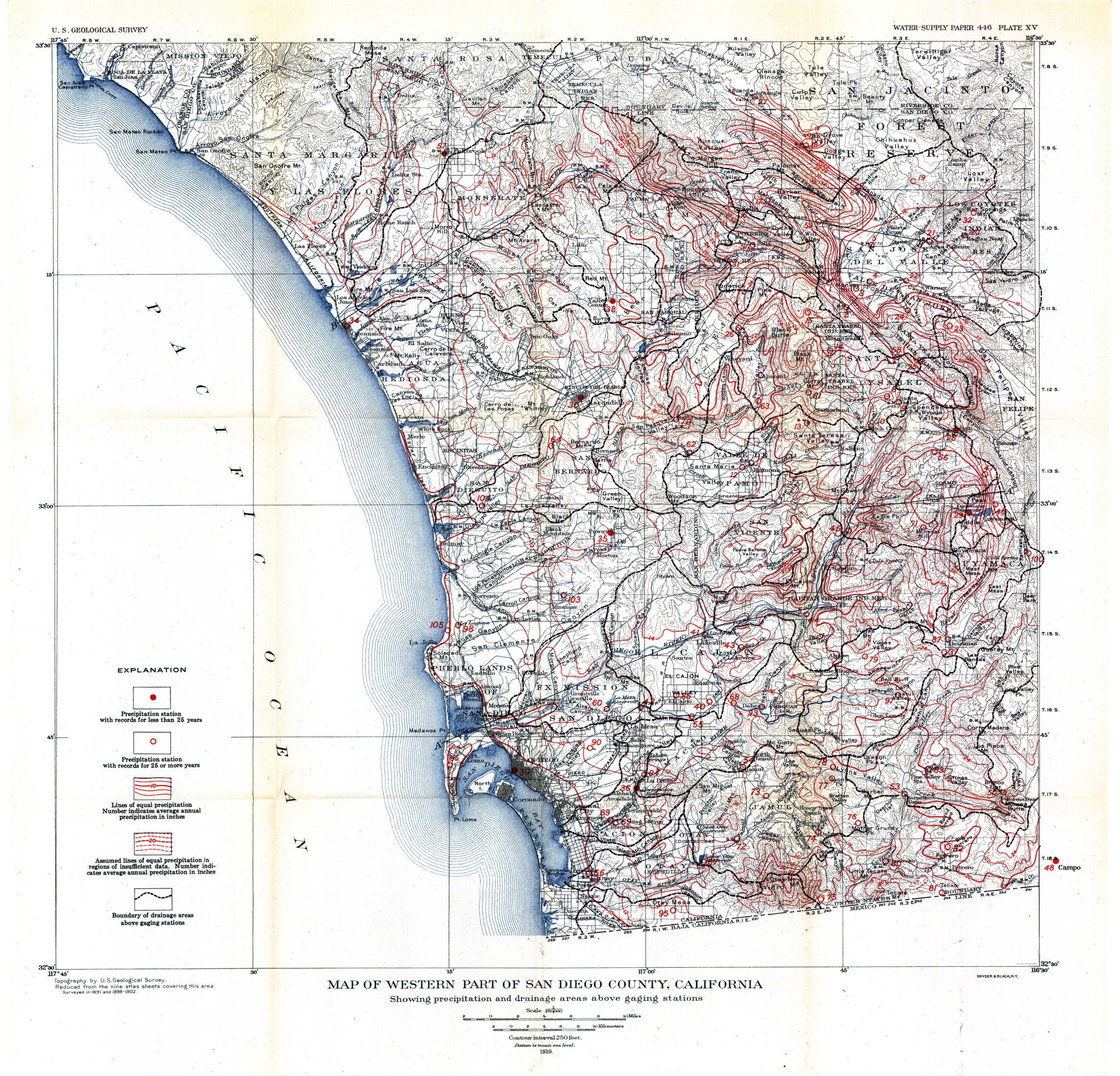
San Mateo Rocks visible in top left of this map of the western part of San Diego County, California (United States Geological Survey, 1919)

San Mateo Rocks are uninhabited islands that lie approximately 0.5 mi (0.80 km) off the coast of California, to the south of San Clemente, and just north of San Mateo Point, a minor headland that marks the border between Orange County and San Diego County. The rocks rise about 3 ft (or about 1 m) above high tide.

The rocks are a common destination for local dive boats and scuba diving.

== Ecology ==
The San Mateo rocks host a transient population of California sea lions (Zalophus californianus). On one occasion the rocks population of sea lions attracted a pod of orcas (Orcinus orca)—quite uncommon in local waters—who used a clever pack-hunting technique to force the sea lions off the rock and into the water where they would be ready prey. These rocks are also used as a pinniped haul-out point.

== History ==
Before documentary records of the islands existed, indigenous people of the area may have used the San Mateo Rocks as a pinniped hunting ground.

The Rocks first appear in the documentary record of the area in 1889 when they were described in the Coast Pilot. The sloop Victoria wrecked on the rocks in a storm in 1907.

In 1931 the United States Coast Guard reserved the location, along with several other Orange County Rocks, for a possible future San Mateo Rocks Lighthouse, and an act of Congress assigned ownership to the Bureau of Land Management in 1935, but the lighthouse facility was never built.

In the early 1970s the waters around the rocks were a collection site for a seaweed species belonging to the genus Gelidium for use in the production of agar.

In 2017, the San Mateo Rocks became part of the California Coastal National Monument.
