= Trinidad Head Light =

Lighthouse in California, United States

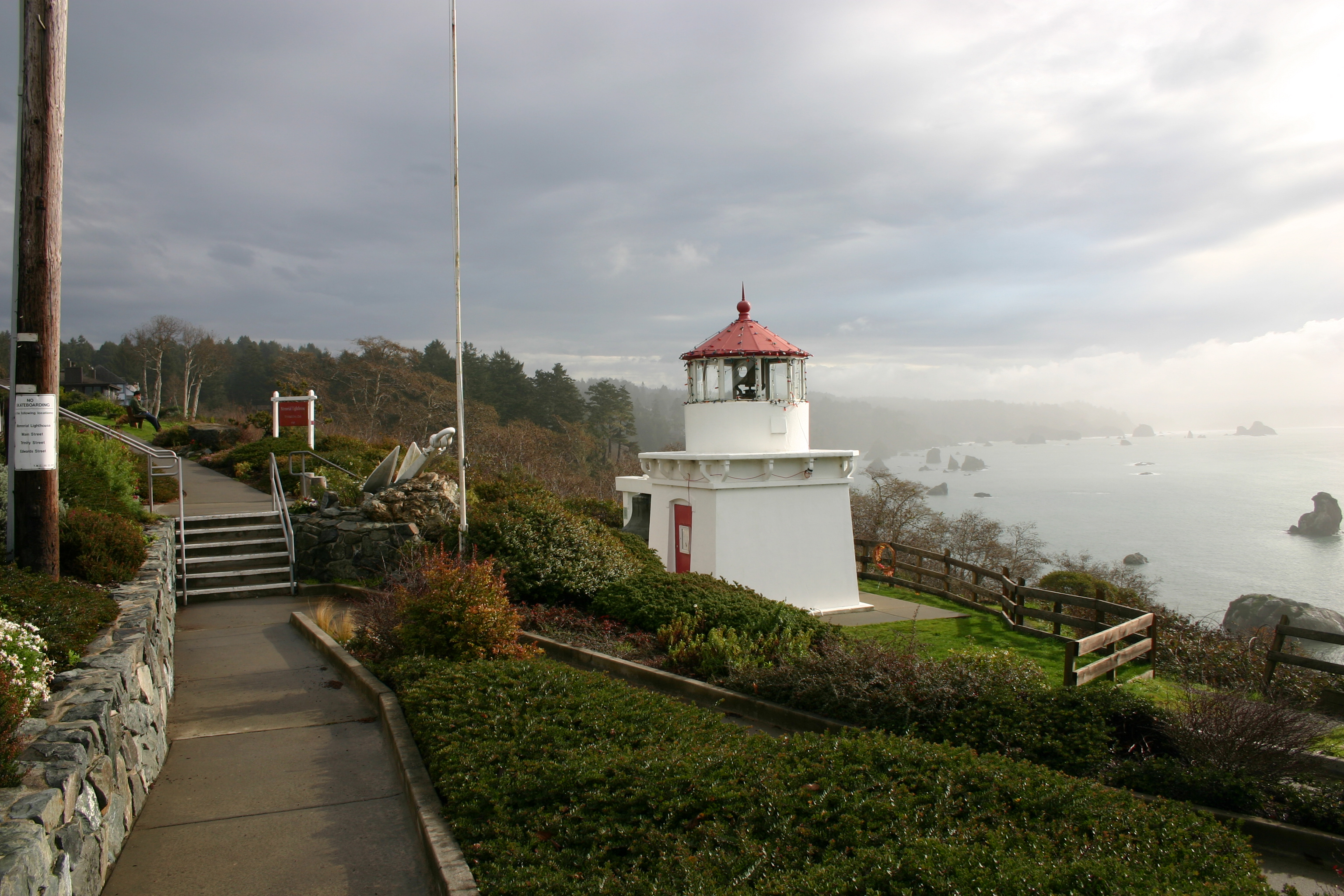
- Trinidad Memorial Light (replica) in 2004
- Location: Trinidad; California; United States
- Coordinates: 41°3′7.0″N 124°9′5.2″W

Tower
- Constructed: 1866 (first)
- Foundation: stone basement
- Construction: brick
- Automated: 1974
- Height: 25 feet (7.6 m)
- Shape: square pyramidal tower
- Operator: U.S. Bureau of Land Management
- Heritage: National Register of Historic Places listed place
- Fog signal: original: bell current: horn, 1 blast every 30s.

Light
- First lit: 1871 (current)
- Focal height: 196 feet (60 m)
- Lens: Fourth order Fresnel lens (1898), 14.8 inches (375 mm) optic (current)
- Range: 14 nautical miles (26 km; 16 mi)
- Characteristic: Oc W 4s.
- Trinidad Head Light Station
- U.S. National Register of Historic Places
- U.S. Historic district
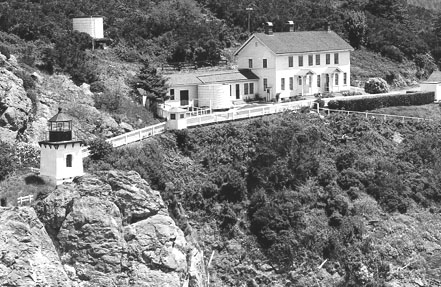
- Nearest city: Trinidad, California
- Area: 20 acres (8.1 ha)
- Architectural style: Lighthouse
- MPS: Light Stations of California MPS
- NRHP reference No.: 91001098
- Added to NRHP: September 3, 1991

Trinidad Head Lighthouse is a historic lighthouse on Trinidad Head on the outskirts of Trinidad, California. Built in 1871, it is 20 miles (32 km) north of Eureka, California.

== History ==
The low, square, brick tower, painted white, was built in 1871. The light is only 20 feet (6.1 m) above ground, but the headland on which it stands gives it an elevation of 196 feet (60 m) above the sea. Despite its great height above the sea, heavy seas have been known to reach it. A huge wave hit the lighthouse at about 4:40 p.m. local time on the afternoon of 31 December 1914. In early 1915, the lighthouse keeper, United States Lighthouse Service Captain Fred L. Harrington, who served at the light from 1888 to 1916, made the following report about the incident:

"At 4:40 p. m. I observed a sea of unusual height. When it struck the bluff the jar was very heavy. The lens immediately stopped revolving. The sea shot up the face of the bluff and over it, until the solid sea seemed to me to be on a level with where I stood in the lantern. The sea itself fell over onto the top of the bluff and struck the tower about on a level with the balcony. The whole point between the tower and the bluff was buried in water."

The wave Harrington described, likely a rogue wave, was the highest recorded ocean wave to have struck the United States West Coast. According to Harrington, it washed completely over 93-foot-tall (28 m) Pilot Rock offshore, and broke over the top of the 175-foot-tall (53 m) bluff on which the lighthouse stood. His report the wave appeared to reach the height of the lantern and that water from the breaking wave submerged the area between the lighthouse and the bluff and reached the lighthouse's balcony suggests a possible wave height of 200 feet (61 m). The impact of the wave shook the lighthouse and extinguished the light, although Harrington restored service in four hours.

== Buildings and structures ==
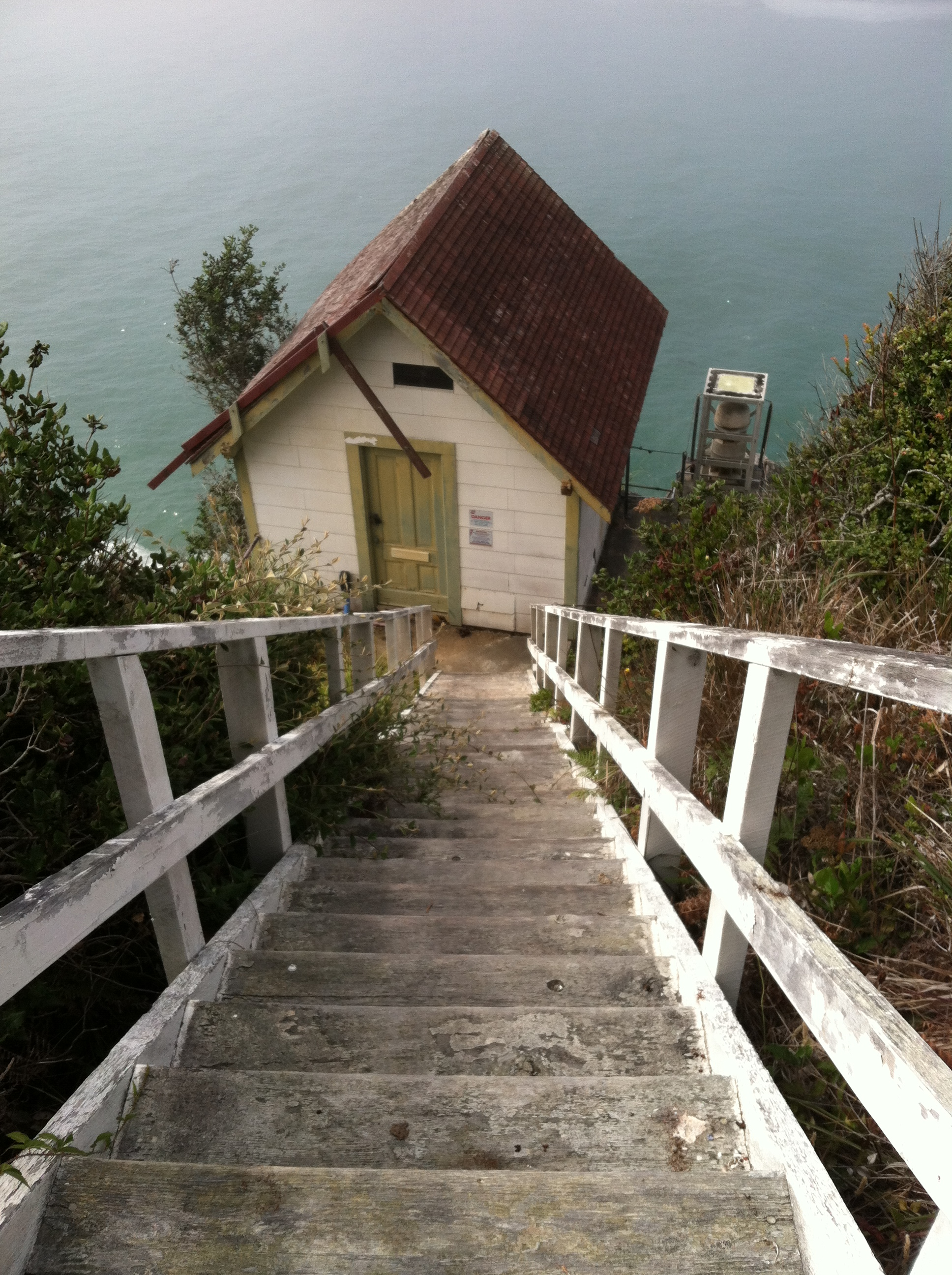
The historic Bell House, the current location of the fog signal

The station originally consisted of the small two-story light tower, a single Victorian residence, and a small barn. In 1898, a bell house was constructed, and a 4,000-pound (1,814 kg) bell was added that was operated by weights. A second keeper was assigned at that time, and the quarters were expanded to accommodate two families. In 1947, the fog signal was changed to an air horn. In 1949, the Trinidad Civic Club constructed a facsimile of the tower in a park overlooking the harbor and installed the original lens in its structure as a memorial to those lost or buried at sea. The 4,000-pound (1,814 kg) bell is displayed alongside the tower. In the late 1960s, the Coast Guard razed the original dwelling and barn and constructed the present triplex, opened in 1969. The fog signal was discontinued when the station was automated in 1974. Complaints from the citizens of Trinidad Head were so vocal that the Coast Guard installed the present ELG 300, operated by a fog detector. The new fog signal is operated in the original bell house. The original tower remains essentially unchanged.

The replica building along with the original lens was moved to tribal land at the bottom of the unstable bluff to prevent possible loss due to erosion.

== Head keepers ==
- Jeremiah Kiler (1871–1888)
- William A. Henderson (1888)
- Frederick L. Harrington (1888–1916)
- Josephine I. Harrington (1916)
- Edward Wiborg (1916 – at least 1930)
- Malcolm Cady (at least 1932 – 1940)
- Perry S. Hunter (1940 – at least 1946)

== National Register listing ==
The lighthouse was listed as Trinidad Head Light Station on the National Register of Historic Places on September 3, 1991, reference number 91001098. The 1900 fog-signal building is a contributing building, and the 1871 lighthouse tower is listed as a contributing structure. The 1969 keeper's building, which replaced the original keeper's residence, is non-contributing to the listing.

== See also ==
Other historic lighthouses in Humboldt County:

- Punta Gorda Light
- Cape Mendocino Light
- Table Bluff Light
