= Weller (disambiguation) =

Weller is a surname.

Weller may also refer to:

== Business ==
- Weller Flugzeugbau, a German aircraft manufacturer
- Weller Pottery, largest American manufacturer of commercial and art pottery in early twentieth century
- Weller, a brand of soldering irons and other electronic products made by Apex Tool Group

== Places ==
- Weller, Virginia, an unincorporated community in the United States
- Weller Township (disambiguation)

== See also ==
- Weller brothers (disambiguation)
- Weller House
- Weller Township
