= Point Arena Hot Springs =

Coordinates: 38°52′26.4″N 123°31′4.8″W

Point Arena Hot Springs in the early 20th century.

The Point Arena Hot Springs are hot springs located along the Garcia River, 15 miles southeast of Point Arena in Mendocino County, California, in the United States. The hot springs served as a popular resort in the late 19th and early 20th centuries. In 1913, the California Blue Book described the Point Arena Hot Springs as "one of California's most beautiful health resorts." The Point Arena Hot Springs reside within private timber company property, and are no longer legally accessible to the public.

== The springs ==
The springs are located in the canyon of the Garcia River. There are two very small, mud bottomed pools on the steep and slippery rock bank of the river. Located within private timber company property, the springs are no longer legally accessible to the public. The springs produce between 1.5 and 3 gallons of mild sulphur water at between 90 and 95 degrees. Now only accessible by hike, the hot springs are 7 arduous miles with 48 river crossings, some so deep that one must carry their gear above their heads. The hike is very hard and can take 5+ hours.

== Resort history ==
The resort was founded in 1895 and opened to the public in 1904. By 1910 a hotel was built on site, including several cottages and camping tents, with a capacity for 100 guests. The resort offered, hunting, fishing, croquet, billiards, a bowling alley, and a photography darkroom. It also offered onsite dining and dancing in the evening. The resort cost $12 a week to visit. While the resort was operating, the springs were formed into cemented basins, with two small bathhouses built over the stream with bathtubs. Guests also bathed directly in the springs. The property was only accessible by horse and carriage. The Hotel and accompanying buildings burned down in the 1920s, leaving only 2 small concrete tubs as evidence the resort ever existed.
