= Trinidad, California =

City in California, United States

- City
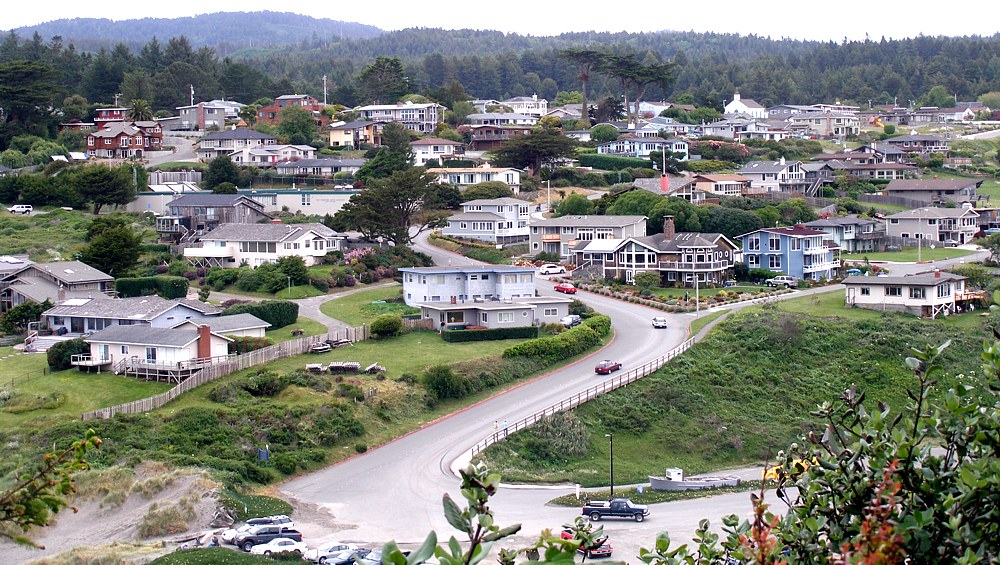
- A view of Trinidad from a trail on nearby Trinidad Head on May 27, 2006.

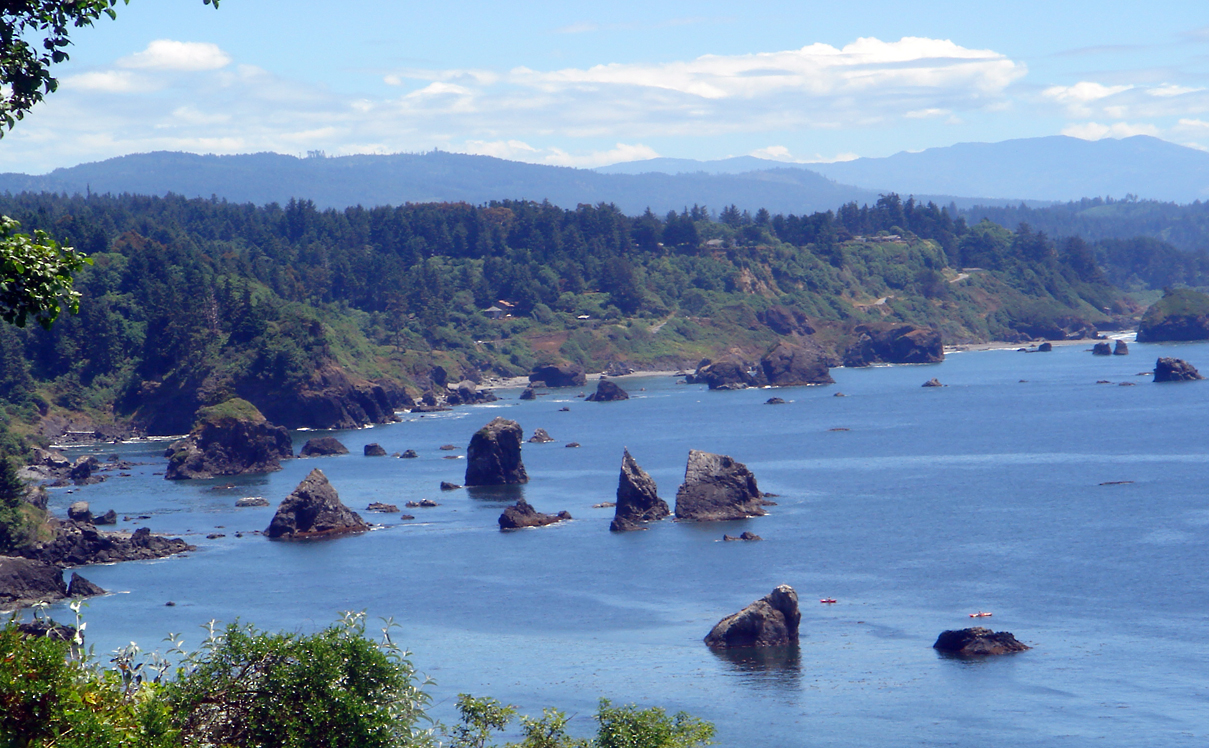
- A 2007 view of the coastline south of Trinidad overlooking Trinidad Bay with offshore rocks; part of the California Coastal National Monument.
- Interactive map of Trinidad, California
- Location in the United States Trinidad (California) Trinidad (the United States)
- Coordinates: 41°03′33″N 124°08′35″W
- Country: United States
- State: California
- County: Humboldt
- Incorporated: November 7, 1870

Government
  - Type: Council-Manager Government
  - Mayor: Cheryl Kelly

Area
  - Total: 0.67 sq mi (1.74 km^{2})
  - Land: 0.49 sq mi (1.26 km^{2})
  - Water: 0.19 sq mi (0.48 km^{2}) 27.74%
- Elevation: 174 ft (53 m)

Population (2020)
  - Total: 307
  - Density: 633/sq mi (244.5/km^{2})
- Time zone: UTC-8 (Pacific (PST))
  - Summer (DST): UTC-7 (PDT)
- ZIP code: 95570
- Area code: 707
- FIPS code: 06-80448
- GNIS feature IDs: 1660029, 2412093
- Website: trinidad.ca.gov

California Historical Landmark
- Reference no.: 216

Trinidad (Spanish for "Trinity"; Yurok: Chuerey) is a seaside city in Humboldt County, California, United States, located on the Pacific Ocean, 8 miles (13 km) north of the Arcata-Eureka Airport and 15 miles (24 km) north of the college town of Arcata. Trinidad is noted for its coastline, with ten public beaches and offshore rocks, part of the California Coastal National Monument, of which Trinidad is a "Gateway City." Fishing operations related to Trinidad Harbor are vital to both local tourism and commercial fishing interests in the region. Situated at an elevation of 174 feet (53 m) above its own North Coast harbor, Trinidad is one of California's smallest incorporated cities by population, with 307 residents in 2020, down from 367 residents in 2010.

== History ==
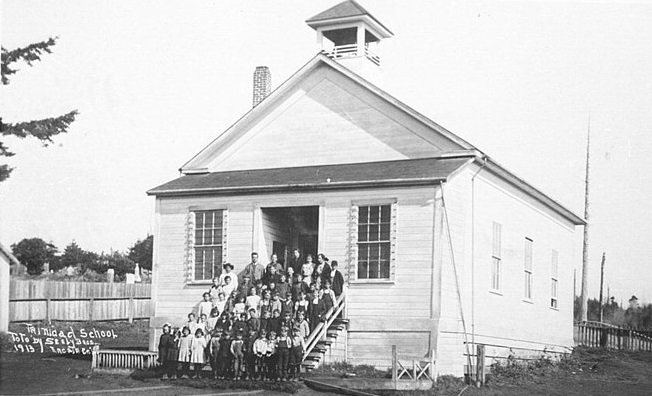
Trinidad School on January 2, 1913. It was built in the early 1870s and used until 1914. (From Boyle Collection, Humboldt State University Library)

The Yurok people established the village of Tsurai on bluffs overlooking Trinidad Bay in prehistoric times. They occupied the village for thousands of years before vacating it in 1916.

The first European sighting of Trinidad Harbor was in 1595 by the Manila galleon captain Sebastian Rodriguez Cermeño, who did not make landfall. The next European visit was by Bruno de Heceta and Juan Francisco de la Bodega y Quadra of the Spanish Navy. Their two ships anchored in Trinidad Bay on June 9, 1775. On June 11, 1775, which was Trinity Sunday, Heceta and his men conducted a formal act of possession, claiming the bay for King Charles III of Spain. At the place where they erected a wooden Christian cross, a carved granite cross bearing the inscription Carolus III Dei G. Hyspaniorum Rex ("In the name of King Charles of Spain") was installed in 1913. The Spaniards named the area "La Santisima Trinidad" ("The Most Holy Trinity"). Heceta and Bodega were the first Europeans to locate and describe the village of Tsurai.

The area was under the control of the Kingdom of Spain until Mexico's independence in 1821, when it became part of Mexico. The Russian-American Company started using Trinidad Bay as a base for sea otter hunting around 1806. They considered a permanent outpost there but instead established Fort Ross near Bodega Bay in 1812. The United States conquered California during the Mexican-American War in 1846, and California became a U.S. state in 1850. American settlers arrived in Trinidad Bay on the ship James R. Whitting in 1850 and founded the town, renamed Warnersville in honor of R. V. Warner, one of the settlers. The first post office opened in Trinidad in 1851.

Trinidad was the original county seat of the eponymous Trinity County from 1850 to 1851, and of Klamath County, one of California's original counties, from 1851 to 1854. In 1854 Trinidad became part of the newly created Humboldt County after its creation in 1853 with its county seat in Eureka. Klamath County was finally dissolved in 1874.

During the American Civil War (1861–1865), California volunteers fighting the local Native Americans in the Bald Hills War were stationed at Camp Trinidad in Trinidad beginning in July 1863 to protect both the town and the coast road from Native American raids. In October 1863 they were moved 4 miles (6.4 km) north to Camp Gilmore.

Trinidad was incorporated on November 7, 1870, as a city of the State of California.

On December 31, 1914, the largest recorded ocean wave ever to hit the United States West Coast struck Trinidad Head, a rocky promontory surrounded by sea stacks sheltering Trinidad Harbor. At 4:40 p.m. local time, United States Lighthouse Service lighthouse keeper Captain Fred L. Harrington at Trinidad Head Light observed a huge wave 200 yards (180 m) offshore approaching the bluff on which the lighthouse stood. He reported that the wave, which appeared to him to reach the height of the lighthouse's lantern 196 feet (60 m) above sea level, washed completely over 93-foot-tall (28 m) Pilot Rock offshore, then broke over the top of the 175-foot-tall (53 m) bluff, submerging the area between the lighthouse and the bluff, with water reaching the lighthouse's balcony. His report that the wave crested at a height equal to that of the lantern and that water reached the balcony suggests a possible wave height of 200 feet (61 m). The wave's impact shook the lighthouse and extinguished its light, although Harrington restored service in four hours.

A California Sea Products Company whaling station operated in Trinidad from 1920 to 1926. During its operations, 1,140 whales were killed and processed.

Trinidad resident Henry A. Boyes was a United States Marine Corps first sergeant with the 5th Marine Regiment during World War II (1941–1945). His service was described by Eugene Sledge in the 1981 book With the Old Breed: At Peleliu and Okinawa.

A portion of Trinidad Head totaling 46 acres (19 hectares) was transferred to the City of Trinidad in 1983 with the condition that the property be maintained for public recreation. The southern 13 acres (5.3 hectares) of the promontory, including Trinidad Head Light, remained under United States Coast Guard ownership until 2014, when the Coast Guard transferred it to the United States Department of the Interior's Bureau of Land Management. The city rezoned its portion of the promontory as "open space," and in 1984 it opened a trail running around Trinidad Head.

In January 2017, the United States Congress added the Bureau of Land Management's portion of Trinidad Head to the onshore area of the California Coastal National Monument. United States President Barack Obama used his executive power under the 1906 Antiquities Act to designate the Bureau of Land Management's portion of Trinidad Head as a unit of the National Monument.

== Geography ==
=== Climate ===
Trinidad has an oceanic climate, bordering on a warm-summer Mediterranean climate (csb), and is relatively temperate compared with inland areas. Annual temperatures range from approximately 37.1 to 74.2 °F (2.8 to 23.4 °C). Winter months are rainy with the average amount being around 50 inches (130 cm), Although rain falls in all months of the year, it is less pronounced in the summertime. Spring and autumn cold fronts often form advection fog which pushes the marine layer towards the coast. In summer, low-pressure troughs produced by intense heating inland can create strong pressure gradients pulling the marine layer ashore. Summer fogs, moderate precipitation and mild temperatures are characteristic of Northern California coastal forests ecoregion and are vital to the growth of local Coast Redwood. Protected stands of old growth redwoods can be visited 20 miles (32 km) north of Trinidad, in Redwood National and State Parks.

Climate data for Trinidad, California
| Month | Jan | Feb | Mar | Apr | May | Jun | Jul | Aug | Sep | Oct | Nov | Dec | Year |
|---|---|---|---|---|---|---|---|---|---|---|---|---|---|
| Mean daily maximum °F (°C) | 53.6 (12.0) | 55.4 (13.0) | 58.0 (14.4) | 61.1 (16.2) | 65.3 (18.5) | 69.5 (20.8) | 73.7 (23.2) | 74.2 (23.4) | 72.5 (22.5) | 66.6 (19.2) | 57.3 (14.1) | 52.2 (11.2) | 63.3 (17.4) |
| Daily mean °F (°C) | 45.4 (7.4) | 46.6 (8.1) | 48.4 (9.1) | 50.8 (10.4) | 54.7 (12.6) | 58.6 (14.8) | 62.1 (16.7) | 62.4 (16.9) | 59.7 (15.4) | 54.9 (12.7) | 48.8 (9.3) | 44.7 (7.1) | 53.1 (11.7) |
| Mean daily minimum °F (°C) | 37.2 (2.9) | 37.7 (3.2) | 38.8 (3.8) | 40.4 (4.7) | 44.0 (6.7) | 47.6 (8.7) | 50.5 (10.3) | 50.4 (10.2) | 46.8 (8.2) | 43.1 (6.2) | 40.2 (4.6) | 37.1 (2.8) | 42.8 (6.0) |
| Average precipitation inches (mm) | 9.3 (240) | 7.7 (200) | 7.2 (180) | 4.5 (110) | 2.8 (71) | 1.3 (33) | 0.3 (7.6) | 0.4 (10) | 0.9 (23) | 3.2 (81) | 7.6 (190) | 10.6 (270) | 55.8 (1,415.6) |
| Average snowfall inches (cm) | 0.2 (0.51) | 0.6 (1.5) | 0.2 (0.51) | 0 (0) | 0 (0) | 0 (0) | 0 (0) | 0 (0) | 0 (0) | 0 (0) | 0 (0) | 0.4 (1.0) | 1.4 (3.52) |
| Average rainy days | 16.3 | 14.6 | 16.3 | 12.8 | 9.0 | 5.0 | 2.2 | 2.8 | 4.2 | 8.2 | 15.6 | 17.3 | 124.3 |
| Average snowy days | 0.2 | 0.3 | 0.2 | 0 | 0 | 0 | 0 | 0 | 0 | 0 | 0 | 0.3 | 1 |

== Demographics ==
Historical population
| Census | Pop. | Note | %± |
|---|---|---|---|
| 1880 | 104 | | — |
| 1930 | 107 | | — |
| 1940 | 94 | | −12.1% |
| 1950 | 188 | | 100.0% |
| 1960 | 289 | | 53.7% |
| 1970 | 300 | | 3.8% |
| 1980 | 379 | | 26.3% |
| 1990 | 362 | | −4.5% |
| 2000 | 311 | | −14.1% |
| 2010 | 367 | | 18.0% |
| 2020 | 307 | | −16.3% |
U.S. Decennial Census

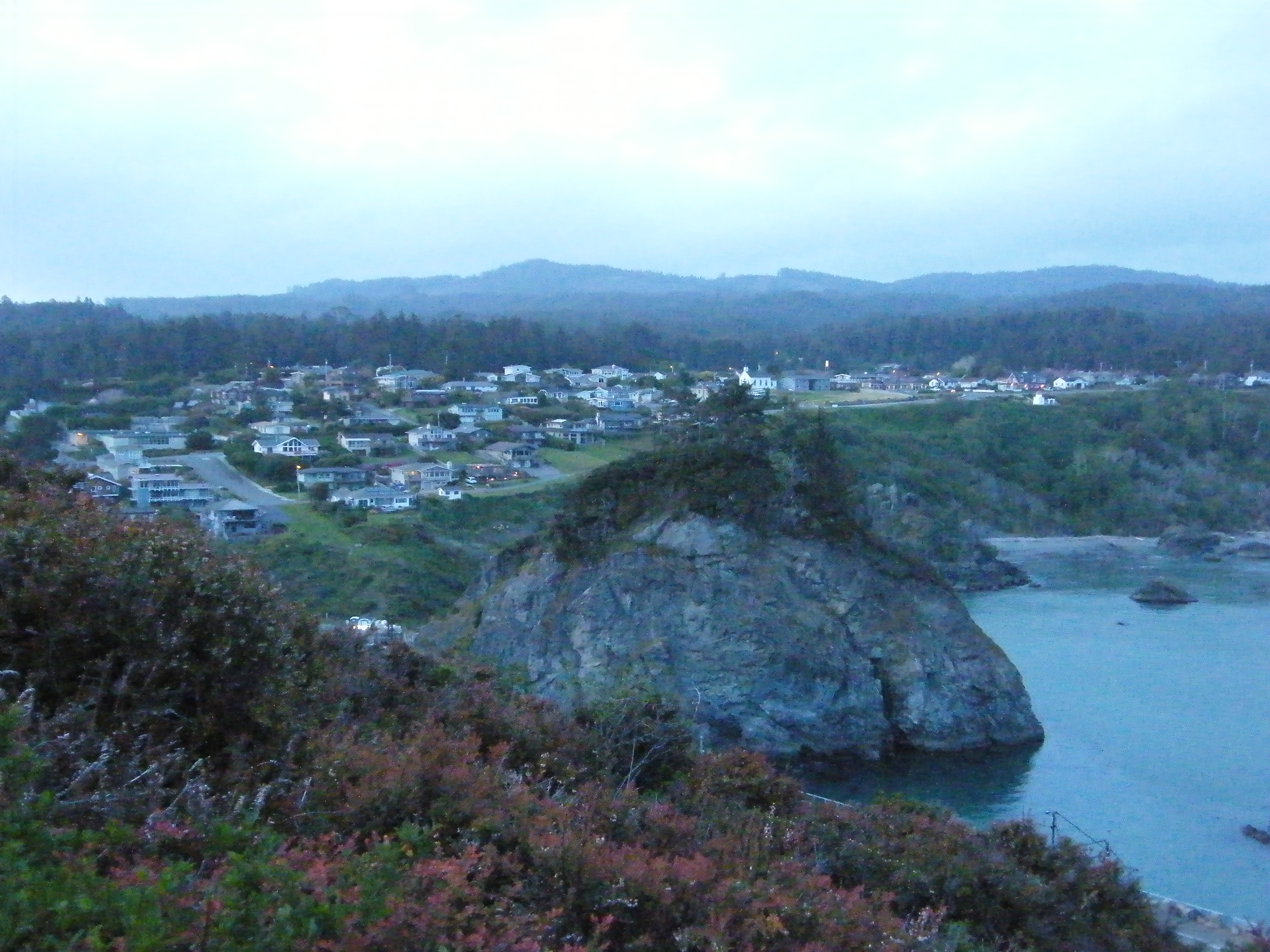
Trinidad seen from Trinidad Head on May 8, 2008.

=== 2020 Census ===
The 2020 United States census reported that Trinidad had a population of 307. The population density was 633.0 inhabitants per square mile (244.4/km^{2}). The racial makeup of Trinidad was 261 (85.0%) White, 1 (0.3%) African American, 4 (1.3%) Native American, 1 (0.3%) Asian, 0 (0.0%) Pacific Islander, 6 (2.0%) from other races, and 34 (11.1%) from two or more races. Hispanic or Latino of any race were 10 persons (3.3%).

The entire population lived in households. There were 166 households, out of which 37 (22.3%) had children under the age of 18 living in them, 80 (48.2%) were married-couple households, 7 (4.2%) were cohabiting couple households, 43 (25.9%) had a female householder with no partner present, and 36 (21.7%) had a male householder with no partner present. 58 households (34.9%) were one person, and 24 (14.5%) were one person aged 65 or older. The average household size was 1.85. There were 99 families (59.6% of all households).

The age distribution was 37 people (12.1%) under the age of 18, 6 people (2.0%) aged 18 to 24, 67 people (21.8%) aged 25 to 44, 88 people (28.7%) aged 45 to 64, and 109 people (35.5%) who were 65 years of age or older. The median age was 58.3 years. For every 100 females, there were 96.8 males.

There were 231 housing units at an average density of 476.3 units per square mile (183.9 units/km^{2}), of which 166 (71.9%) were occupied. Of these, 105 (63.3%) were owner-occupied, and 61 (36.7%) were occupied by renters.

=== 2010 Census ===
The 2010 United States census reported that Trinidad had a population of 367. The population density was 547.1 inhabitants per square mile (211.2/km^{2}). The racial makeup of Trinidad was 331 (90.2%) White, 2 (0.5%) African American, 15 (4.1%) Native American, 2 (0.5%) Asian, 1 (0.3%) Pacific Islander, 1 (0.3%) from other races, and 15 (4.1%) from two or more races. Hispanic or Latino of any race were 11 persons (3.0%).

The Census reported that 366 people (99.7% of the population) lived in households, 1 (0.3%) lived in non-institutionalized group quarters, and 0 (0%) were institutionalized. There were 187 households, out of which 35 (18.7%) had children under the age of 18 living in them, 64 (34.2%) were opposite-sex married couples living together, 21 (11.2%) had a female householder with no husband present, 3 (1.6%) had a male householder with no wife present. There were 20 (10.7%) unmarried opposite-sex partnerships, and 3 (1.6%) same-sex married couples or partnerships. 73 households (39.0%) were made up of individuals, and 28 (15.0%) had someone living alone who was 65 years of age or older. The average household size was 1.96. There were 88 families (47.1% of all households); the average family size was 2.64.

The population dispersal was 60 people (16.3%) under the age of 18, 25 people (6.8%) aged 18 to 24, 91 people (24.8%) aged 25 to 44, 120 people (32.7%) aged 45 to 64, and 71 people (19.3%) who were 65 years of age or older. The median age was 45.9 years. For every 100 females, there were 98.4 males. For every 100 females age 18 and over, there were 98.1 males. There were 252 housing units at an average density of 375.7 per square mile (145.1/km^{2}), of which 187 were occupied, of which 113 (60.4%) were owner-occupied, and 74 (39.6%) were occupied by renters. The homeowner vacancy rate was 4.2%; the rental vacancy rate was 12.9%. 212 people (57.8% of the population) lived in owner-occupied housing units and 154 people (42.0%) lived in rental housing units.

=== 2000 Census ===
As of the census of 2000, there were 311 people, 168 households, and 73 families residing in the city. The population density was 643.0 inhabitants per square mile (248.3/km^{2}). There were 228 housing units at an average density of 471.4 per square mile (182.0/km^{2}). The racial makeup of the city was 94.86% White, 1.61% Black or African American, 0.32% Native American, 0.64% Asian, 0.32% Pacific Islander, 0.32% from other races, and 1.93% from two or more races. 2.25% of the population were Hispanic or Latino of any race. There were 168 households, out of which 12.5% had children under the age of 18 living with them, 36.9% were married couples living together, 5.4% had a female householder with no husband present, and 56.5% were non-families. 40.5% of all households were made up of individuals, and 11.9% had someone living alone who was 65 years of age or older. The average household size was 1.85 and the average family size was 2.51.

In the city, the population dispersal was 11.3% under the age of 18, 5.5% from 18 to 24, 21.9% from 25 to 44, 41.5% from 45 to 64, and 19.9% who were 65 years of age or older. The median age was 50 years. For every 100 females, there were 98.1 males. For every 100 females age 18 and over, there were 100.0 males. The median income for a household in the city was $40,000, and the median income for a family was $50,357. Males had a median income of $39,583 versus $31,167 for females. The per capita income for the city was $28,050. About 2.3% of families and 8.8% of the population were below the poverty line, including 6.7% of those under age 18 and none of those age 65 or over.

== Politics ==
In the state legislature, Trinidad is in the 2nd senatorial district, represented by Democrat Mike McGuire, and the 2nd Assembly district, represented by Democrat Chris Rogers.

Federally, Trinidad is in California's 2nd congressional district, represented by Democrat Jared Huffman.

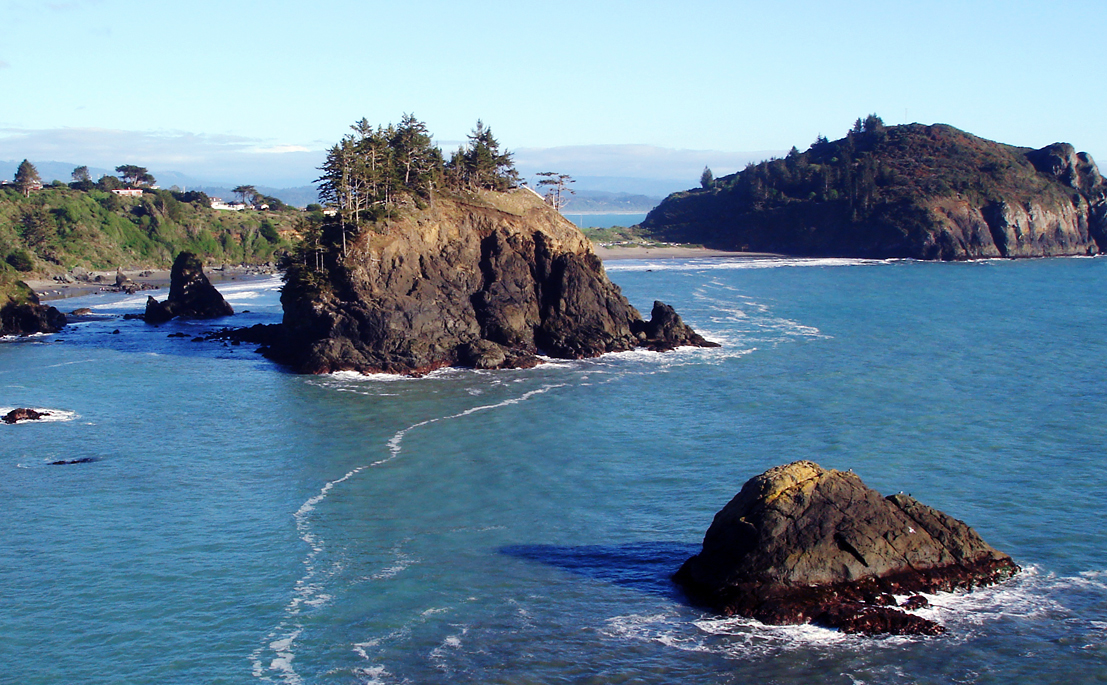
Trinidad State Beach, Pewetole Island, and Trinidad Head from College Cove Bluffs near Trinidad in 2007.

== Points of interest ==
State parks

- Little River State Beach
- Sue-meg State Park
- Trinidad State Beach

Historic landmarks

- Trinidad Head Light, National Registered Landmark #1720
- Trinidad Head, State Historic Landmark #146
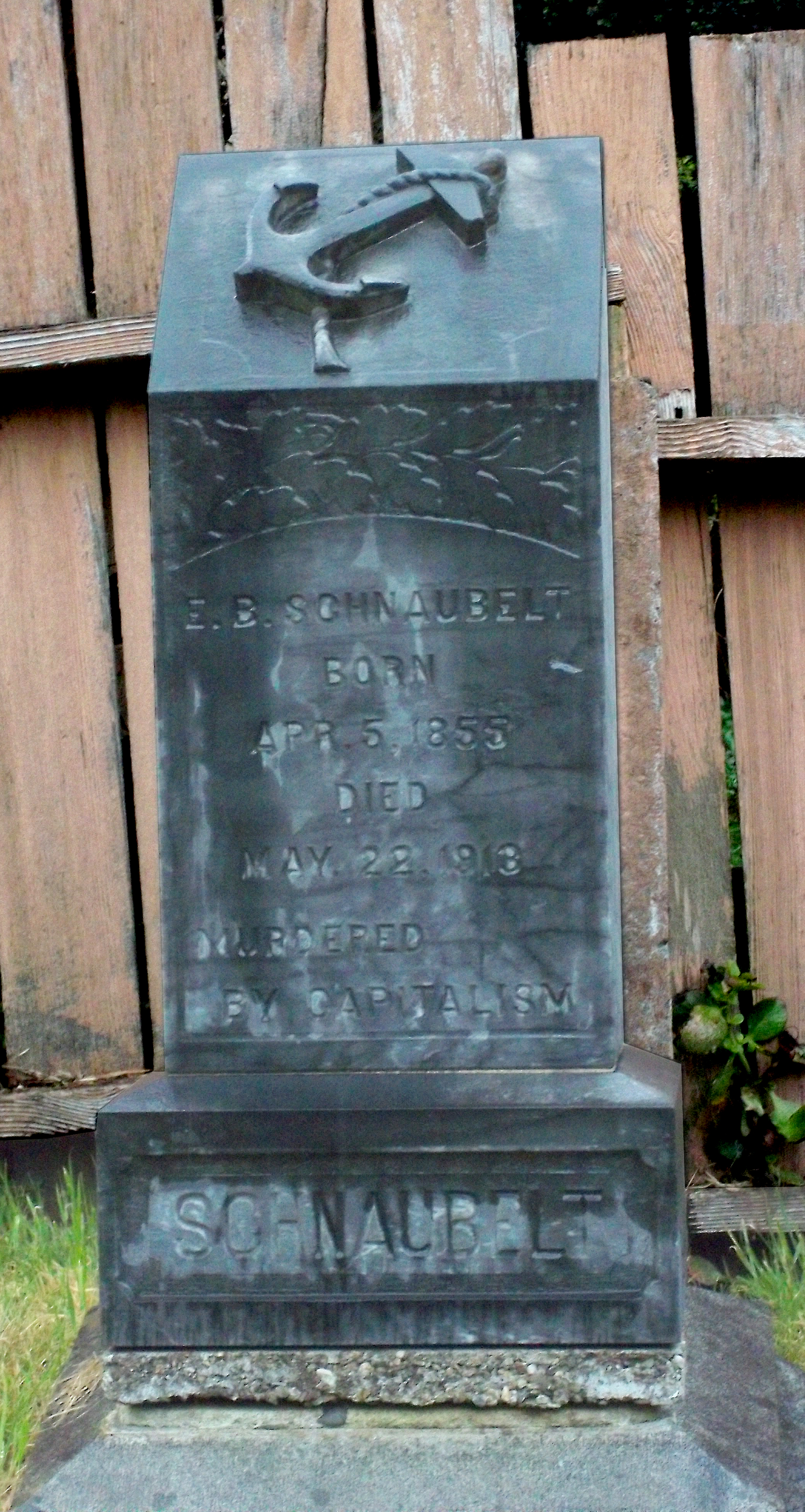
- Edward Bernhardt Schnaubelt's tombstone in the Trinidad Cemetery on April 20, 2011.
  Town of Trinidad, State Historic Landmark #216
- Old Indian Village of Tsurai, State Historic Landmark #838

Other

- Trinidad Pier
- Strawberry Rock
- Fred Telonicher Marine Laboratory, Cal Poly Humboldt University
- Trinidad City Cemetery includes Indian and settler graves and one unusual tombstone. Edward Bernhardt Schnaubelt was the brother of Rudolph Schnaubelt, accused of the Haymarket Riot bombing in Chicago, Illinois and the brother-in-law of Michael Schwab, sentenced to death for his role in the riot. All three Schnaubelt brothers left Chicago shortly after the riot. Edward Schnaubelt briefly panned for gold before settling in Trinidad, opening a sawmill and buying a tract of timber to supply his mill. After Schnaubelt's mill was taken over by his rivals, he re-entered the closed mill at night to reclaim his personal tools and was shot to death by a nightwatchman hired to protect the property. His wife chose the phrase "Murdered by Capitalism" for his marker which inspired the 2004 book by John Ross.

== Events ==
- Trinidad to Clam Beach Run (February)
- Trinidad Fishermans Feast (October)
- Tour of Trinidad bicycle rides, 100k, 45k, 20k (September)
- Blessing of the Fleet (November)

== Notable people ==
- Robert Durst (1943–2022), real estate scion and suspected serial killer, former Trinidad homeowner
- Michael John Fles (b. 1936), poet and musician
- Victor Golla (1939–2021), linguist, expert on the indigenous languages of California and Oregon
- Howard B. Keck (1913–1996), businessman
- Thomas Pynchon (b. 1937), author who lived in Trinidad from 1976 to 1977
- Don Van Vliet (1941–2010), musician and painter known as Captain Beefheart
- Al Vermeer (1911–1980), cartoonist, creator of comic strip Priscilla's Pop

== In popular culture ==
Part of the auto wreck scene in the 2001 film The Majestic was shot at College Cove Beach on March 19, 2001.
