= Weller brothers (disambiguation) =

Weller brothers may refer to:

- Weller brothers, English merchant traders and whalers
- Weller Brothers, a British motorcycle manufacturer

== See also ==
- Weller (disambiguation)
