= Trinidad to Clam Beach Run =

Coordinates: 41°5′38.06″N 124°9′18.9″W

The Trinidad to Clam Beach Run began in the 1960s in Humboldt County, California as an 8.75-mile (14.08 km) winter training race for track and field athletes attending Humboldt State University. The event grew into a nationally known run and added a 3-mile (4.8 km) and 5 3/4-mile (9.3 km) race. A half marathon was added in 2002, but was discontinued until 2017 when it resumed.

The run starts 3 miles (4.8 km) north of Trinidad, California on Patrick's Point Drive. It continues through town, down Scenic Drive to Moonstone Beach and then on to the final leg on Clam Beach. Crossing the mouth of the Little River at Moonstone Beach is a dramatic feature of the course. The height of the tide on either the last Saturday of January or the first Saturday of February determines the run's date and start time.

The Trinidad to Clam Beach Run is sponsored by the Greater Trinidad Chamber of Commerce. Profits from the run support the Chamber's scholarship fund.
