= Trinidad Head =

Promontory with lighthouse in Humboldt County, California

- Promontory
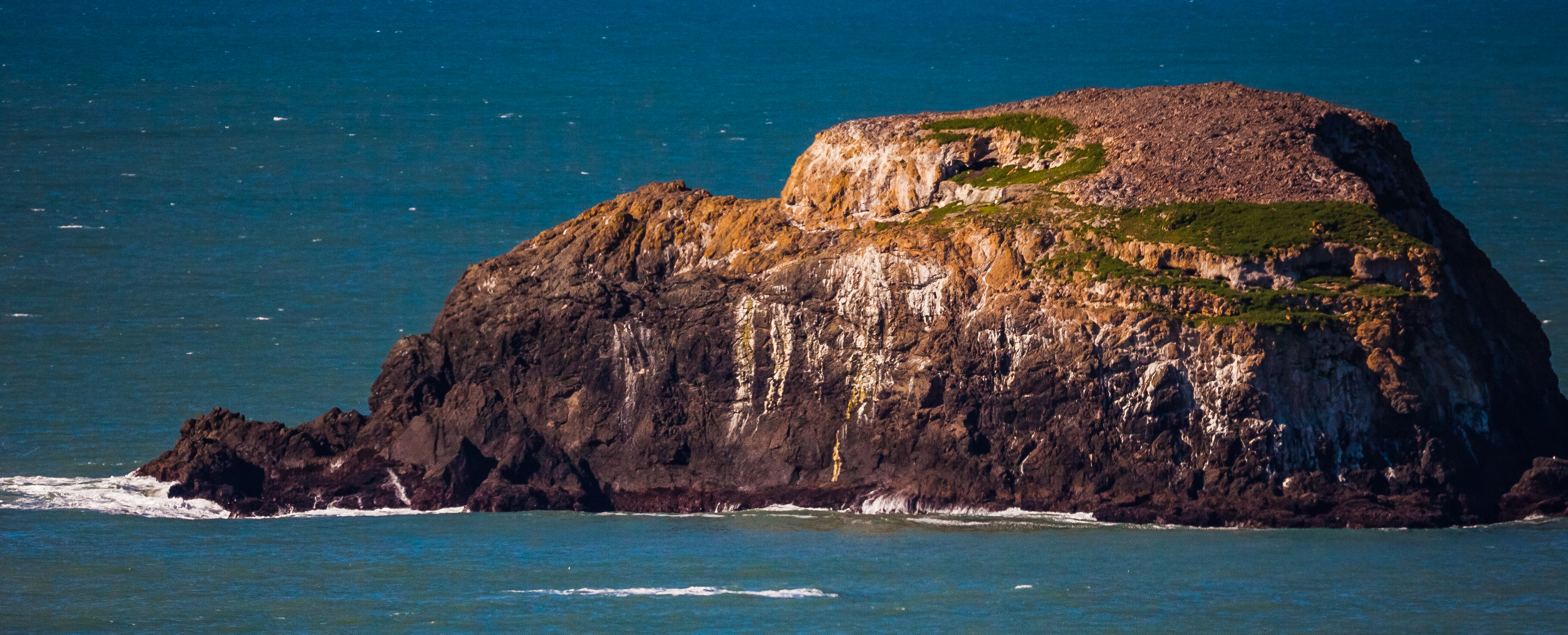

- Location within California
- Coordinates: 41.054308°N 124.150914°W
- Location: Trinidad, California
- Water bodies: Pacific Ocean
- Operator: City of Trinidad, Bureau of Land Management

California Historical Landmark
- Reference no.: 146

U.S. National Monument
- Designated: January 12, 2017
- Unit of the California Coastal National Monument: By President Barack Obama

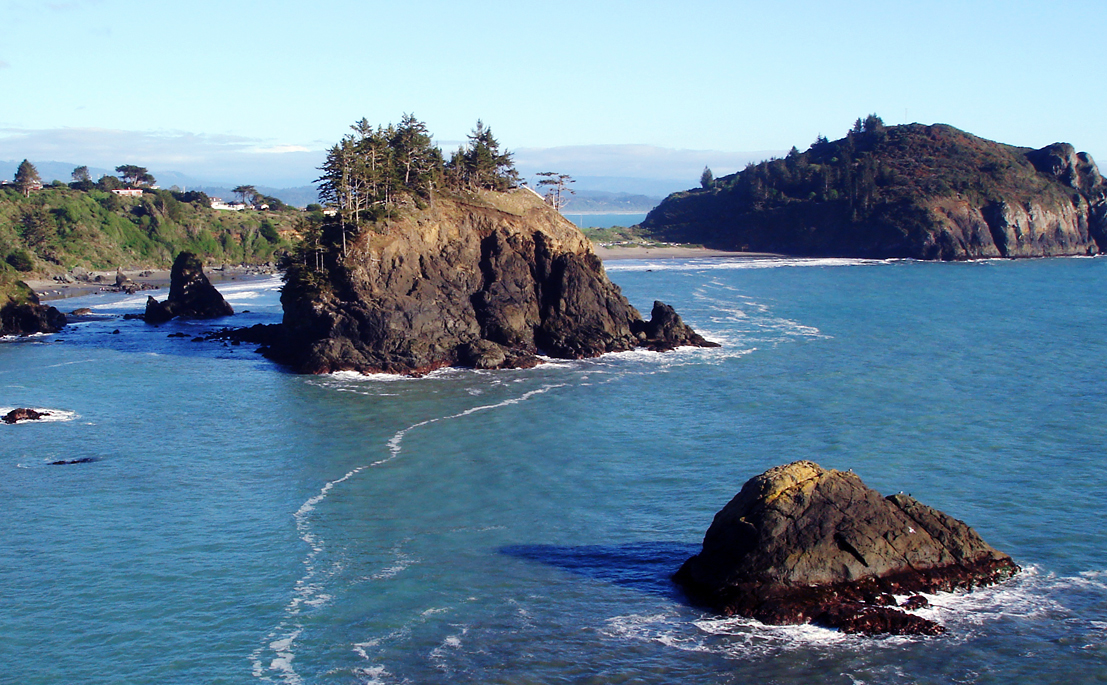
Only a narrow spit connects Trinidad Head (upper right) to the mainland

Trinidad Head: (Yurok: Chuerewa') is a rocky promontory surrounded by sea stacks sheltering Trinidad Harbor, adjacent to the town of Trinidad in Humboldt County, California, USA, designated as California Historical Landmark #146.

== History ==
Sebastião Rodrigues Soromenho, captain of the Portuguese Manila galleon San Augustin, discovered Trinidad Bay in November 1595. He entered the bay, but did not anchor for fear of hitting submerged rocks.

On June 9, 1775, two Spanish Navy explorers, Bruno de Heceta and Juan Francisco de la Bodega y Quadra, anchored in Trinidad Bay. Two days later, on Trinity Sunday, June 11, 1775, Heceta, his men, and two Franciscan fathers who erected a cross on the summit claimed Trinidad Head for Spain in the name of King Charles III. Over the next 75 years, Spanish, Russian and English ships landed at Trinidad Head to hunt sea otters, procure fresh water, and take refuge from storms.

In 1850, during the superintendency of A. D. Bache, the United States Coast Survey mapped the harbor and Trinidad Head under the direction of United States Navy Lieutenant Commander William P. McArthur.

On December 31, 1914, the largest recorded ocean wave ever to hit the United States West Coast struck Trinidad Head. At 4:40 p.m. local time, United States Lighthouse Service Captain Fred L. Harrington, the lighthouse keeper at Trinidad Head Light from 1888 to 1916, observed a huge wave about 200 yards (180 m) offshore approaching the bluff on which the lighthouse stood. He reported that the wave — which seemed to him to rise to a height even with the lens of the lighthouse 196 feet (60 m) above sea level — washed completely over 93-foot-tall (28 m) Pilot Rock offshore, then broke over the top of the 175-foot-tall (53 m) bluff, submerging the area between the lighthouse and the bluff, with water reaching the lighthouse's balcony. His report that the wave crested as high as the lens and that water reached the balcony suggests a possible wave height of 200 feet (61 m). The wave's impact shook the lighthouse and extinguished its light, although Harrington restored service in four hours.

Much of Trinidad Head was transferred from the United States Coast Guard to the city of Trinidad in 1983. The 46 acres (19 hectares) transferred to the city came with the condition that the property be maintained for public recreation. The city zoned it as "open space" and opened a hiking trail around Trinidad Head in 1984.

The southern 13 acres (5.3 hectares) of the promontory containing the lighthouse remained Coast Guard property until 2014, when the Coast Guard transferred it to the United States Department of the Interior′s Bureau of Land Management. In January 2017, the United States Congress added the Bureau of Land Management's portion of Trinidad Head to the onshore area of the California Coastal National Monument. President Barack Obama used his executive power under the 1906 Antiquities Act to designate the Bureau of Land Management's portion as a unit of the National Monument.

== Geology ==
Trinidad Head is composed of metamorphosed gabbro embedded in the surrounding Franciscan melange, topped with Pleistocene sands and gravels.

== U.S. Government facilities ==
- The Trinidad Head Lighthouse was built 1871 and remains in operation.
- The National Aeronautics and Space Administration's (NASA's) Advanced Global Atmospheric Gases Experiment (AGAGE) began observations of key ozone-depleting substances and greenhouse gases at Trinidad Head in 1995. The site was updated in May 2005 with a system which measures more than 40 trace gases involved in stratospheric ozone depletion, climate change, and air quality.
- Trinidad Head Observatory of the National Oceanic and Atmospheric Administration (NOAA) began operation in 2002, monitoring regional and global meteorology.

== Management ==
The Bureau of Land Management manages the promontory cooperatively with the City of Trinidad, the Trinidad Rancheria, the Trinidad Museum Society and the Yurok Tribe.
