= Weller Township =

Weller Township may refer to the following townships in the United States:

- Weller Township, Henry County, Illinois
- Weller Township, Richland County, Ohio

== See also ==
- Weller (disambiguation)
