= Tsurau, California =

Tsurai Chuerey (Yurok)
- Former settlement
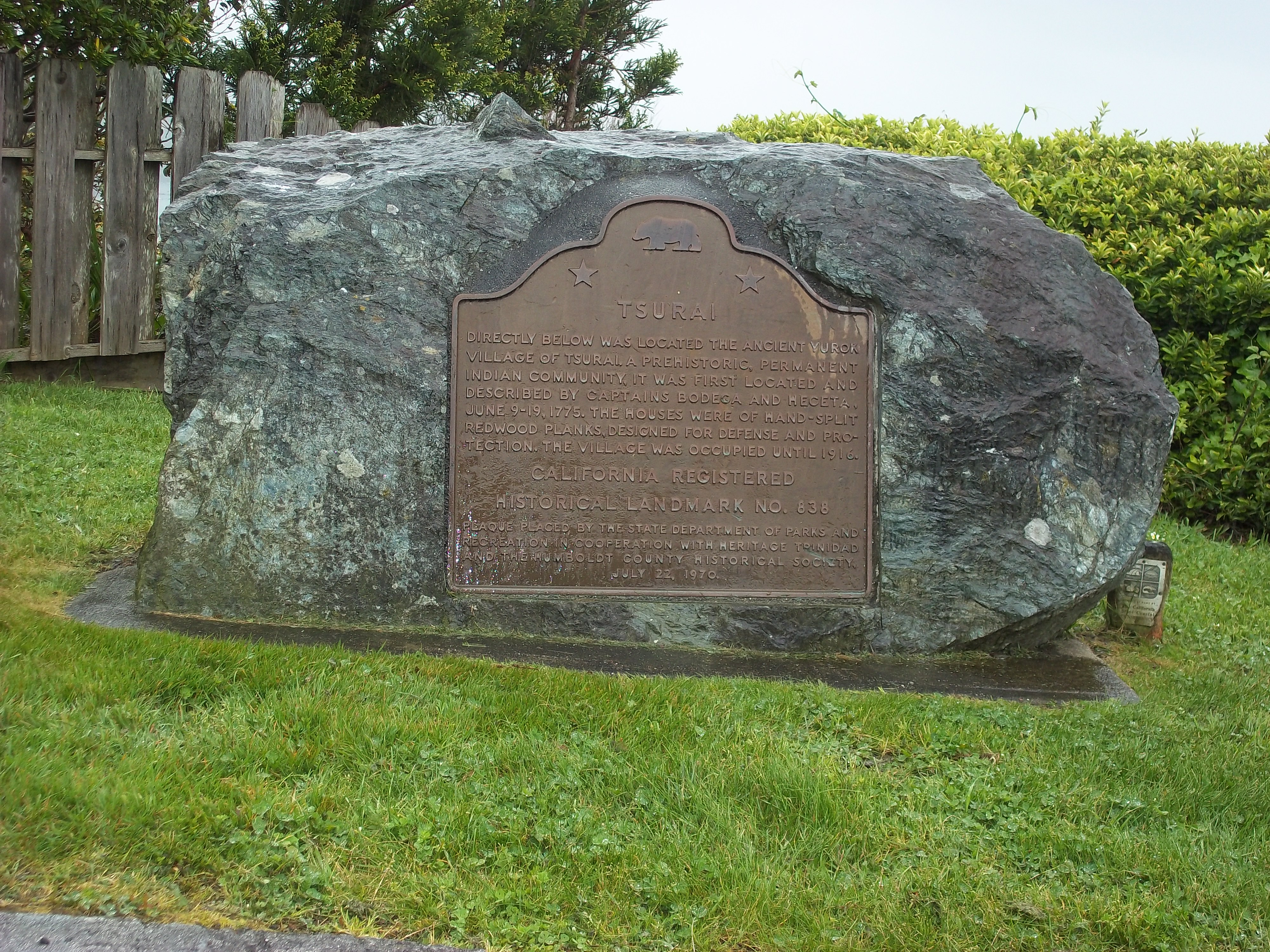
- This stone marker and plaque mark the former location of the indigenous Yurok settlement of Tsurai/Tsuaru.

- Location in California
- Coordinates: 41°03′34″N 124°08′35″W
- Country: United States
- State: California
- County: Humboldt
- Elevation: 174 ft (53 m)

California Historical Landmark
- Official name: Old Indian Village of Tsurai
- Reference no.: 838

Tsurai (Yurok: Chuerey; also Tschura, Tschura-Allequas, Tsurau, and Zoreisch) is a former Yurok settlement in Humboldt County, California, United States. It was located at Trinidad, at an elevation of 174 feet (53 m) and is California State Historic Landmark #838.
