= Punta Gorda Light =

Lighthouse in California, United States

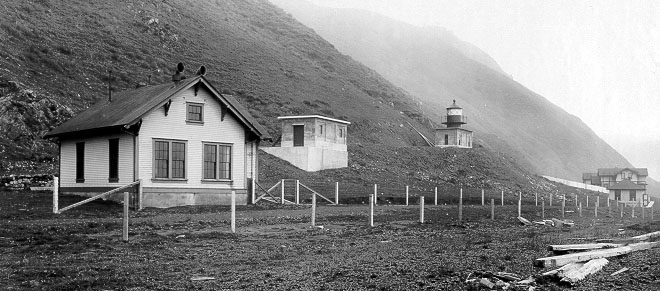
- U.S. Coast Guard Archive
- Location: 12 miles (19 km) south of Cape Mendocino; California; United States
- Coordinates: 40.249433°N 124.350220°W

Tower
- Constructed: 1912
- Foundation: concrete base
- Construction: reinforced concrete tower
- Height: 27 ft (8.2 m)
- Shape: cylindrical short tower with balcony and lantern on oil building
- Markings: white building, black lantern
- Operator: King Range National Conservation Area
- Heritage: National Register of Historic Places listed place

Light
- Deactivated: 1951
- Lens: Fourth order Fresnel lens bulls eye 1912 (removed)

U.S. National Register of Historic Places
- Designated: 1976
- Reference no.: 76000483

Punta Gorda Lighthouse is a lighthouse in the United States, 12 miles (19 km) south of Cape Mendocino, California, within Humboldt County. Access is via a short hike from the end of a 4WD road, or a slightly longer hike along the beach southward from the camping area at the mouth of the Mattole River. It is managed by the Bureau of Land Management.

== History ==
Punta Gorda Lighthouse was built in 1911 and was first lit in 1912. After World War II, it was decided that given the remoteness of the station it was too costly to maintain. A lighted buoy was placed offshore, the fourth order Fresnel lens was removed, and the station was boarded up and deactivated in 1951. The keeper's house and all other station buildings were eventually demolished except the reinforced concrete light station building and the metal framework for the lantern room atop it and the reinforced concrete oil house were left standing.

Historical Information from USCG web site:

Punta Gorda originally consisted of 22 acres (89,000 m^{2}) upon which were situated three dwellings, a small two-story concrete lighthouse, concrete oil house, a wooden fog signal building, blacksmith/carpenter-shop, three storage sheds, and a barn. In 1951 all aids-to-navigation were discontinued, the buildings boarded up and personnel transferred. The property was transferred to the Bureau of Land Management. In the late 1960s "hippies" moved into the quarters and improved them. Local authorities evicted these people and the Bureau of Land Management burned all the buildings except the Lighthouse and oil house. Punta Gorda was and is a very difficult station to reach. Most of the years it was in operation access was via horse, and during good weather horse-drawn wagon. After the United States Coast Guard assumed command a rough road was constructed (that usually washed out) and a jeep was used for transportation. One Coast Guard career horse, named Old Bill, served the Punta Gorda Light Station as a saddle horse, pack horse, and buggy horse for thirty years until the station closed in 1951.

The lighthouse was placed on the National Register of Historic Places in 1976. The Fresnel lens and the flag staff pole were removed many years ago to the Humboldt Bay Maritime Museum located near Eureka, California.

The Punta Gorda Light was known as the "Alcatraz of Lighthouses" because of its remote location and difficult access.

== Keepers ==
Head

- Frederick A. Harrington (1911 – at least 1918)
- James Dunn (at least 1919 – at least 1921)
- Herbert H. Luff (at least 1926 – 1928)
- Charles W. Lindley (1928 – 1939)
- Perry S. Hunter (1939 – 1940)
- Harmon A. Day (1940 – at least 1942)
- Samuel “Hank” – Mostovoy (at least 1949 – 1951)

== See also ==
- List of lighthouses in the United States
- Trinidad Head Light: another historic lighthouse in Humboldt County
- National Register of Historic Places listings in Humboldt County, California
