= California Coastal National Monument =

All islets, reefs and rock outcroppings along the coast of California

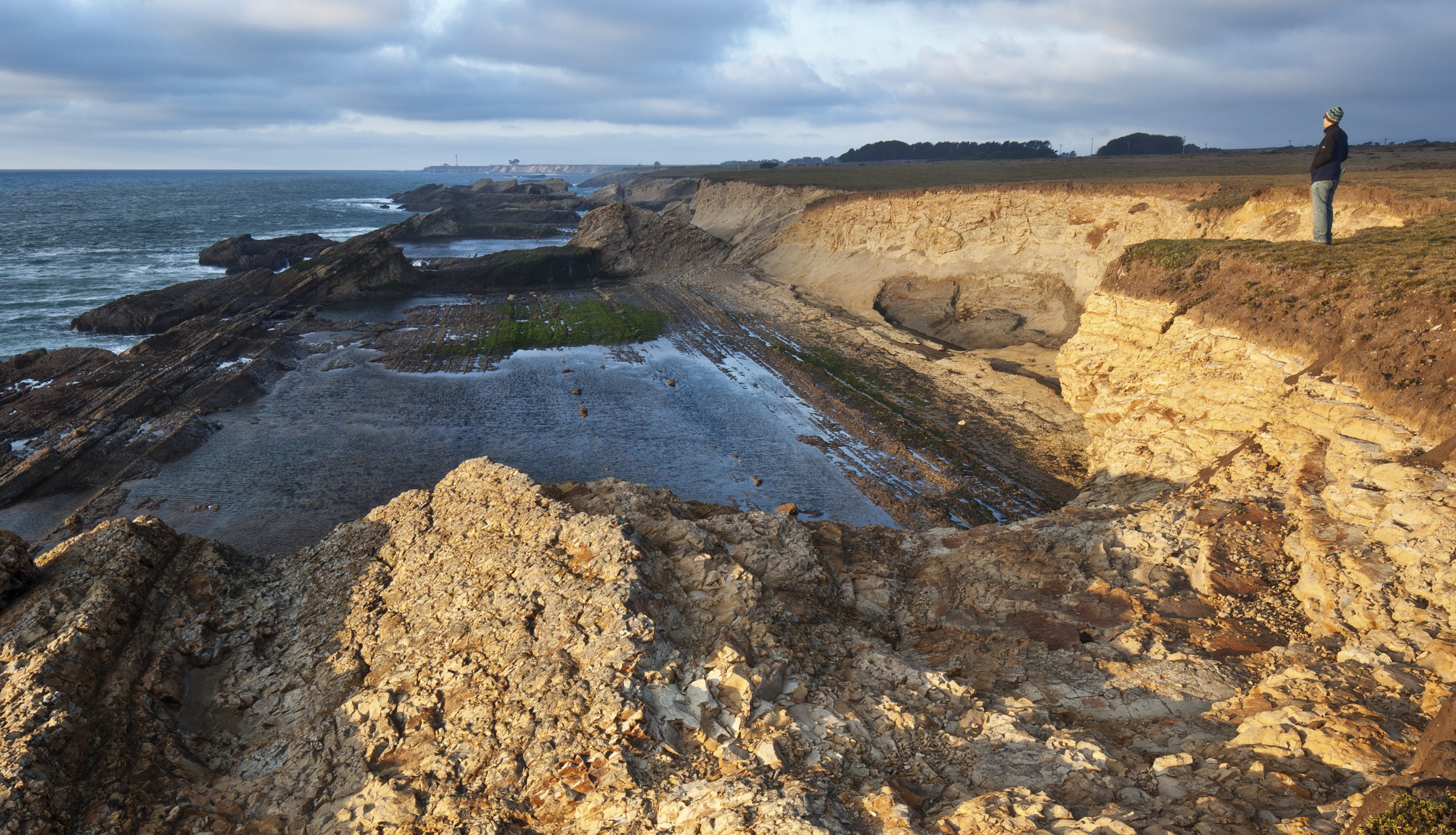
- Stornetta Public Lands unit
- Interactive map of California Coastal National Monument
- Area: 2,272 acres (919 ha)
- Created: January 11, 2000
- Governing body: Bureau of Land Management
- Website: Official website

U.S. National Monument

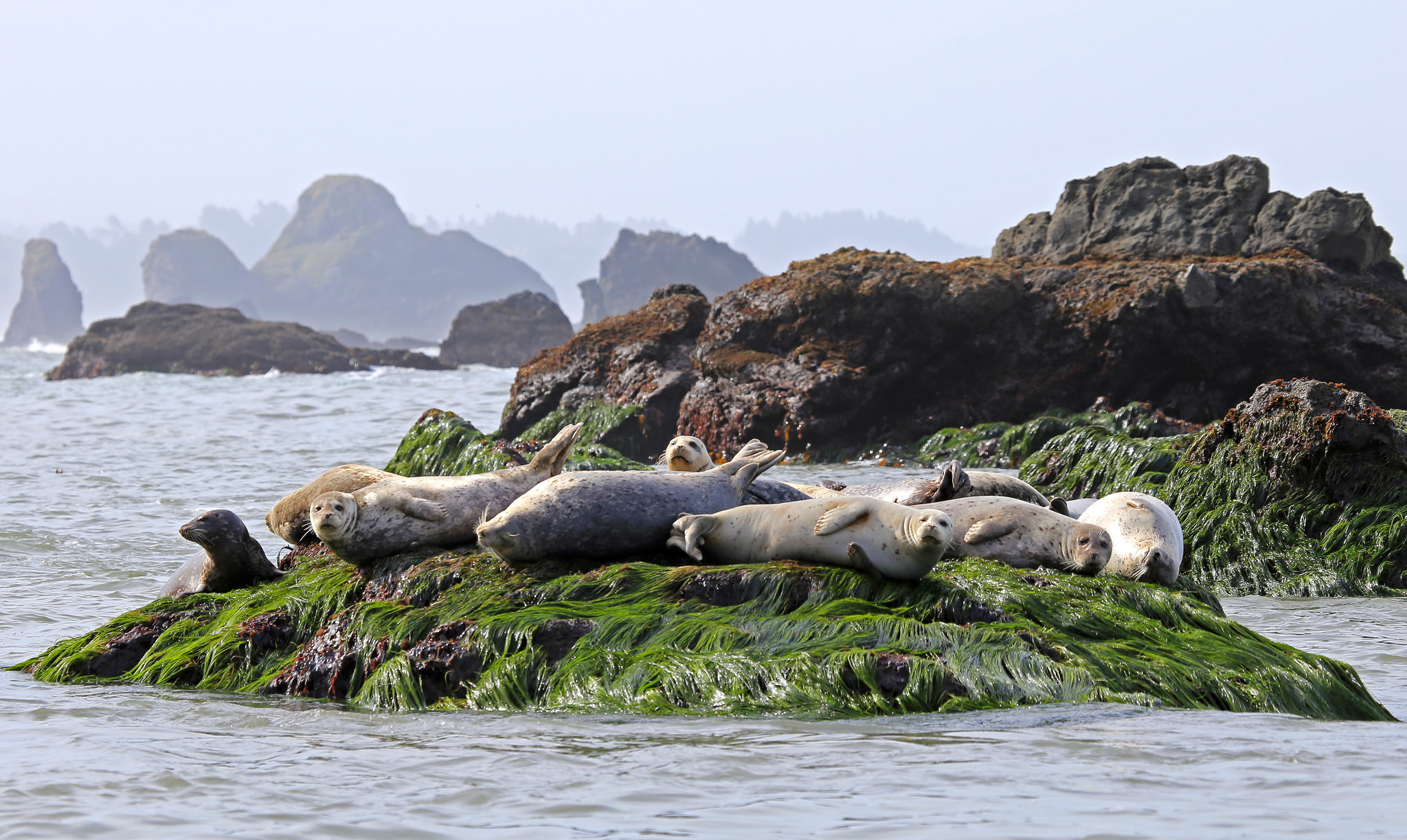
Harbor seals resting on surf grass, in sight of some of the many rocks protected by the California Coastal National Monument

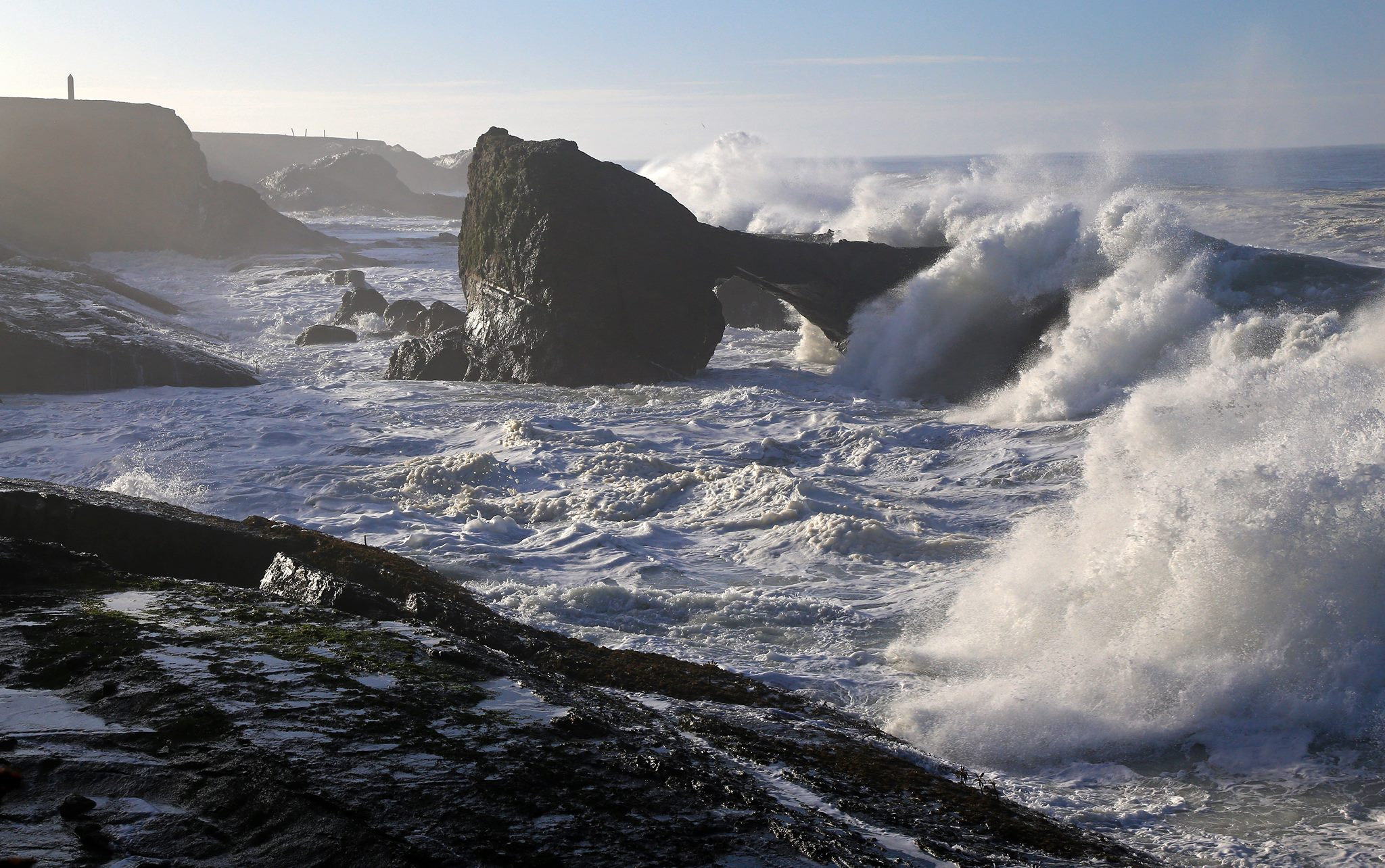
Sea Arch and high surf near Point Arena, CCNM

The California Coastal National Monument is located along the entire coastline of the U.S. state of California. This monument ensures the protection of all islets, reefs and rock outcroppings along the coast of California within 12 nautical miles (22 km) of shore along the entire 840-mile (1,350 km) long coastline. Conservative estimates are for at least 20,000 such outcroppings. The monument was created by Bill Clinton via presidential proclamation on January 11, 2000, with the authority in section two of the Antiquities Act of 1906. As of 2014, the monument has expanded to 2,272 acres (919 ha). The Bureau of Land Management, an agency of the U.S. Department of the Interior that manages the monument, has developed gateways in cooperation with other agencies along the California coast to introduce the monument to the public. These include the Trinidad, Point Arena, Fort Bragg-Mendocino, Pigeon Point Lighthouse, Piedras Blancas State Marine Reserve and Marine Conservation Area, and the Palos Verdes Peninsula. Although being the most-viewed national monument in California, people are usually unaware that the entire coastline is a national monument.

== Expansion ==
The monument has seen two major expansions since its creation:

=== Point Arena-Stornetta Public Lands ===
On March 11, 2014, President Barack Obama used a presidential proclamation to add the Point Arena-Stornetta Public Lands to the monument. The proclamation added 1,665 acres (674 ha) of onshore areas to the existing monument, comprising the estuary of the Garcia River. The Point Arena-Stornetta Public Lands is located on the Mendocino County Coast, north of the small town of Point Arena. Point Arena-Stornetta Public Lands will receive full federal protection and will be open to the public. The Point Arena-Stornetta Public Land was the first onshore segment of the national monument that visitors were allowed on. Under federal protection, the public is allowed to use the land for bird watching, fishing, picnicking, nature photography, and wildlife observation. Overnight camping and parking is prohibited. Along the coastal area there are numerous sinkholes and unsteady cliffs. A bill adding this area passed the US House in 2013.

=== California Coastal National Monument Expansion Act ===
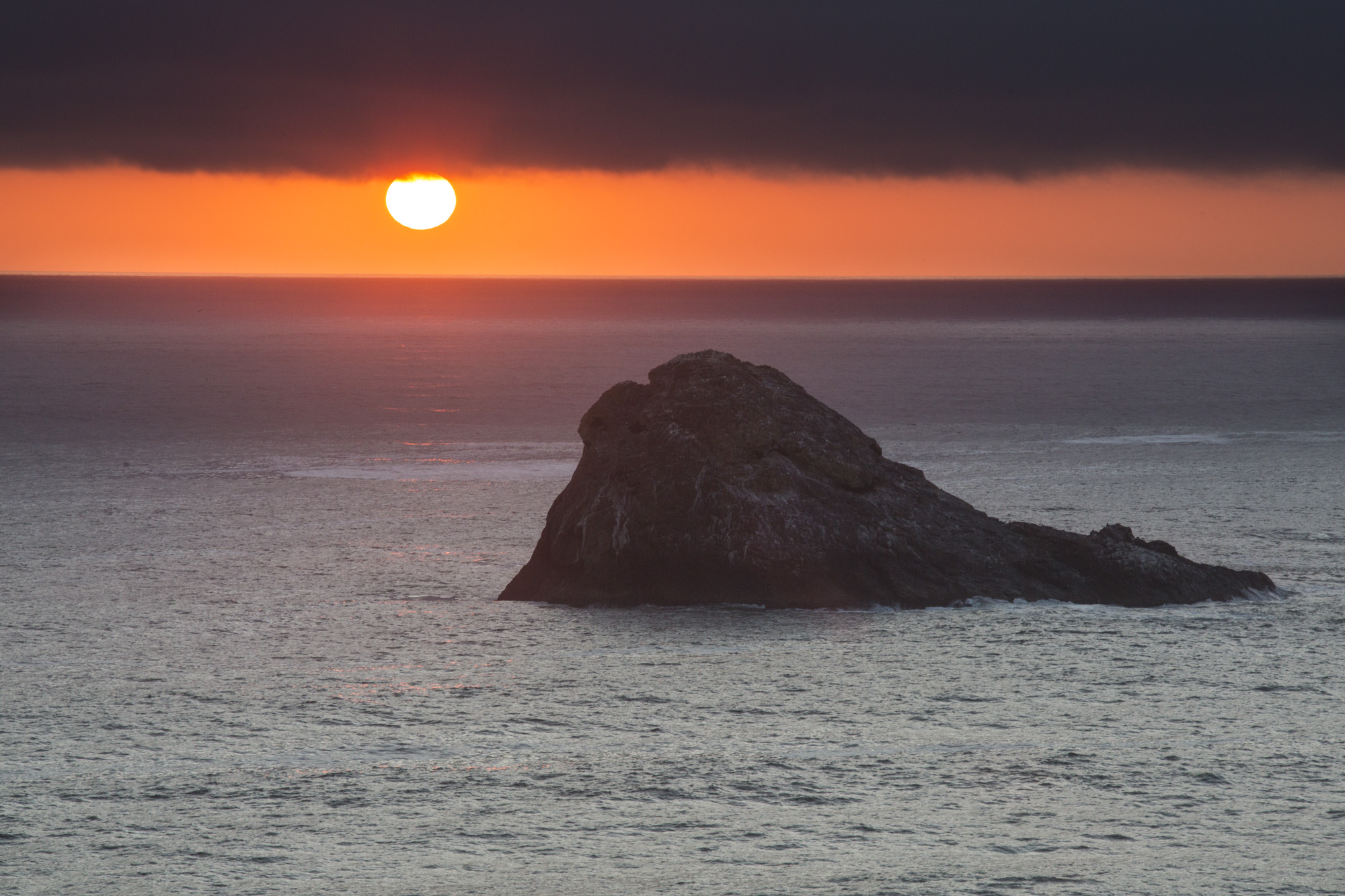
One of thousands of offshore rocks in the CCNM

The California Coastal National Monument Expansion Act of 2017 added five coastal sites: 440 acres (180 ha) at Lost Coast Headlands, 13 acres (5.3 ha) at Trinidad Head, 8 acres (3.2 ha) at Lighthouse Ranch in Humboldt County, 5,780 acres (2,340 ha) from the Cotoni-Coast Dairies in Santa Cruz County and 20 acres (8.1 ha) from Piedras Blancas in San Luis Obispo County. It also would include some small rocks and islands off the coast of Orange County, including the San Mateo Rocks. In January 2017, President Obama used his executive power under the 1906 Antiquities Act to designate these sites as National Monuments.

== Onshore units ==
Six onshore units comprise 7,924 acres (3,207 ha) of public land: Trinidad Head, Waluplh-Lighthouse Ranch, Lost Coast Headlands, Point Arena-Stornetta, Cotoni-Coast Dairies, and Piedras Blancas.

=== Cotoni-Coast Dairies Unit ===
Cotoni-Coast Dairies
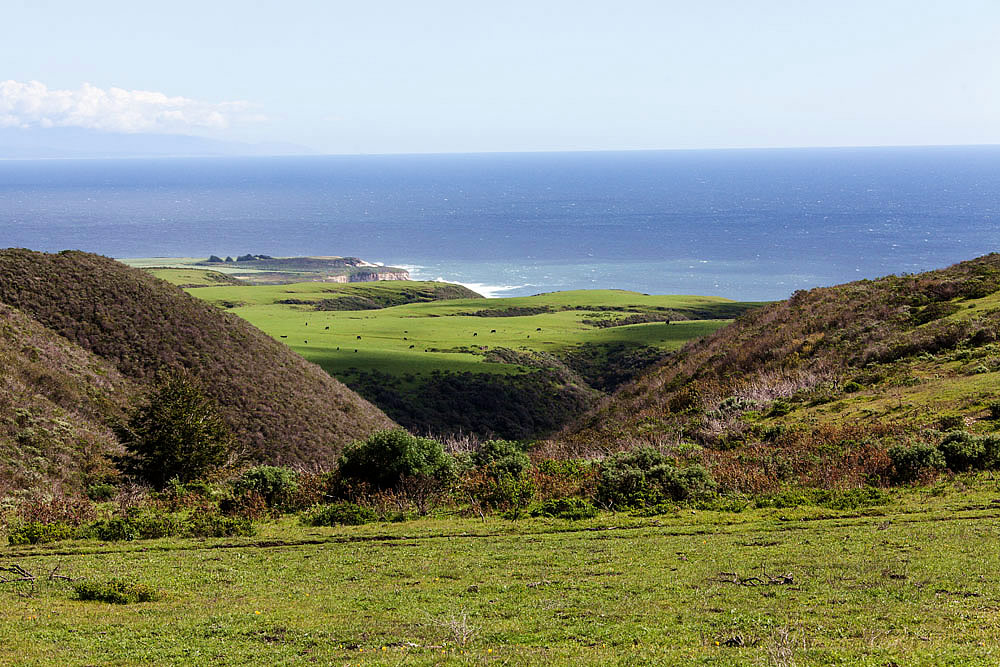
- View of farmland bought by the BLM in 2014

- Location within California
- Location: Davenport, CA
- Nearest city: Santa Cruz, California
- Coordinates: 37.01°N 122.19°W
- Area: 5,843 acres (23.65 km^{2})
- Established: 2014
- Governing body: Bureau of Land Management, Central Coast Field Office

Cotoni-Coast Dairies National Monument is part of the California Coastal National Monument in Santa Cruz County, California, eight miles (13 km) north of the city of Davenport.

For most of the 20th century, Coast Dairies was run as a farm and ranching operation by the descendants of two Swiss families. After it was purchased by Save the Redwoods League in 1998, it was transferred to Trust for Public Land. In 2006, about 400 acres (160 ha) of its beaches to create Coast Dairies State Park. Most of the rest of the land has been transferred to the Bureau of Land Management.

In 2014, the Bureau of Land Management bought a 5,800 acres (2,300 ha) tract of land on the inland side of the highway adjacent to the coastal parcels. President Barack Obama designated Cotoni-Coast Dairies as a National Monument in 2017. The Bureau of Land Management developed a management plan that was approved by the California Coastal Commission in 2020. Some of the land east of the highway will continue to be used for farming, but some will become open to the public. The plan divides the land into four zones. Two of those zones will allow public access, including trails for hiking, mountain biking, and equestrians. The other two zones will not allow public access. BLM is working with the Amah Mutsun Tribal Band to preserve the cultural sites of the indigenous Cotoni people. The property includes critical wildlife habitats, coastal prairies, redwood forests, riparian canyons, six watersheds, and four registered ancestral Native American archaeological sites.

Although the opening of the Cotoni-Coast Dairies National Monument to the public was planned for fall 2022, it was yet to open as of spring 2023, having been delayed due to opposition from activist groups. Objections to the project have included concerns about traffic and the habitats of mountain lions and monarch butterflies.

== See also ==
- California Coastal Commission
- California Coastal Trail
- List of national monuments of the United States
- List of marine protected areas of California
