= Con Creek School =

- U.S. National Register of Historic Places
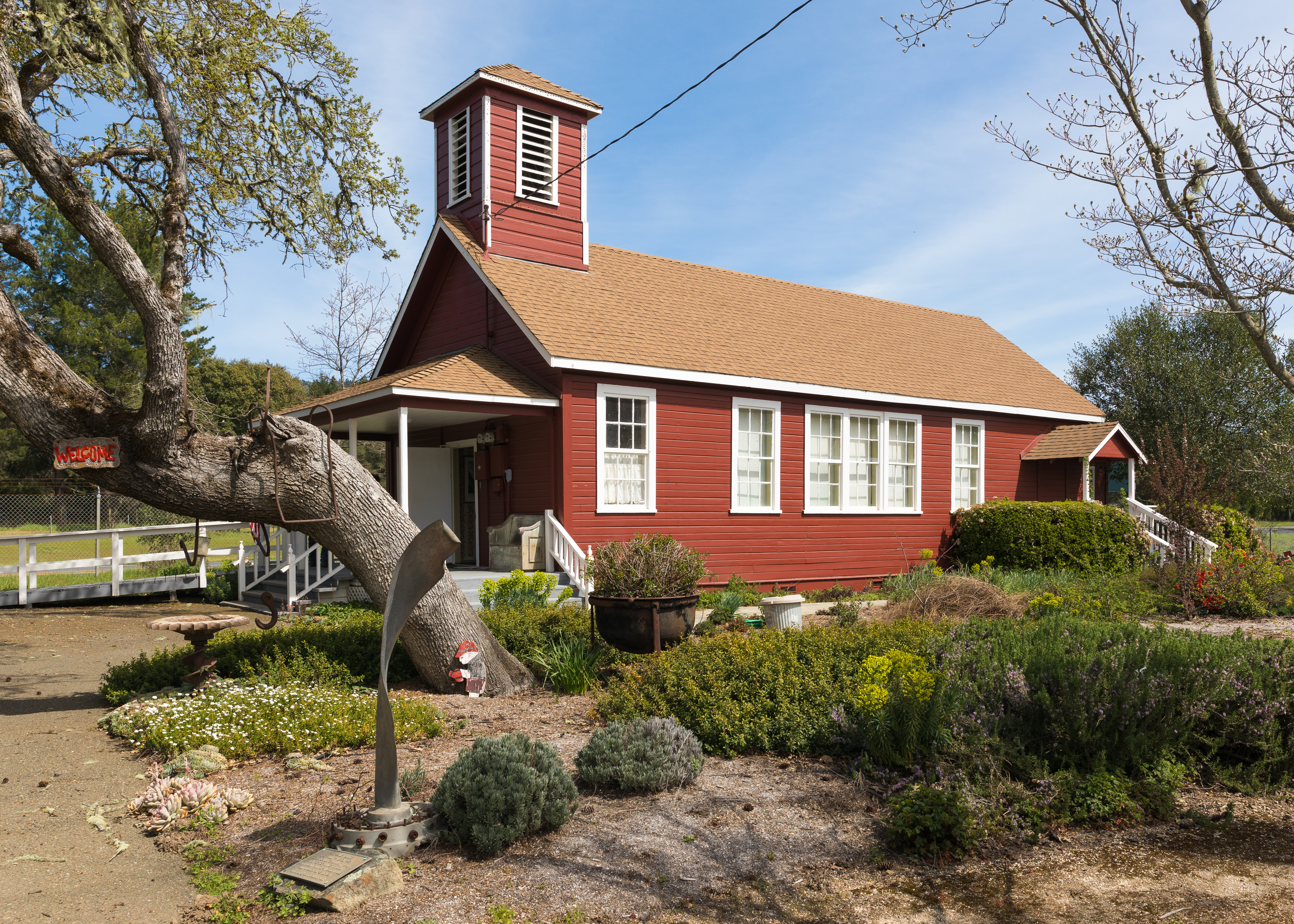

- Location within California Location within the United States
- Nearest city: Boonville, California
- Coordinates: 39°01′47″N 123°23′07″W
- Area: 1.6 acres (0.65 ha)
- Built: 1877
- Built by: J.D. Ball,
- Architectural style: Greek Revival
- NRHP reference No.: 79000498
- Added to NRHP: October 18, 1979

The Con Creek School, in Mendocino County, California near Boonville, California, was built in 1877. The school and another contributing building were listed on the National Register of Historic Places in 1979.

It is located 2 miles (3.2 km) north of Boonville on State Route 128. The one-room schoolhouse was moved about 20 feet (6.1 m) to a new concrete foundation in 1965, to allow for a road realignment.

Also known as the Little Red Schoolhouse, the Con Creek School is a schoolhouse built in the Greek Revival style by J.D. Ball in 1891. Used as a classroom for eight grade levels for 50 years, it was trimmed down to only 7th and 8th grades by 1941. In 1958 its use changed again to that of a kindergarten, and remained so until 1979, when it was donated to the local historical society. The Little Red Schoolhouse is located near the community of Boonville
