= Weller, Virginia =

Unincorporated community in Virginia, United States

Coordinates: 37°19′47″N 82°10′34″W

Weller is an unincorporated community in Buchanan County, Virginia, United States.

== History ==
Weller was named for H. C. Weller, a railroad official.
