= St. Paul's Methodist Episcopal Church (Point Arena, California) =

Historic church in California, United States

- U.S. National Register of Historic Places
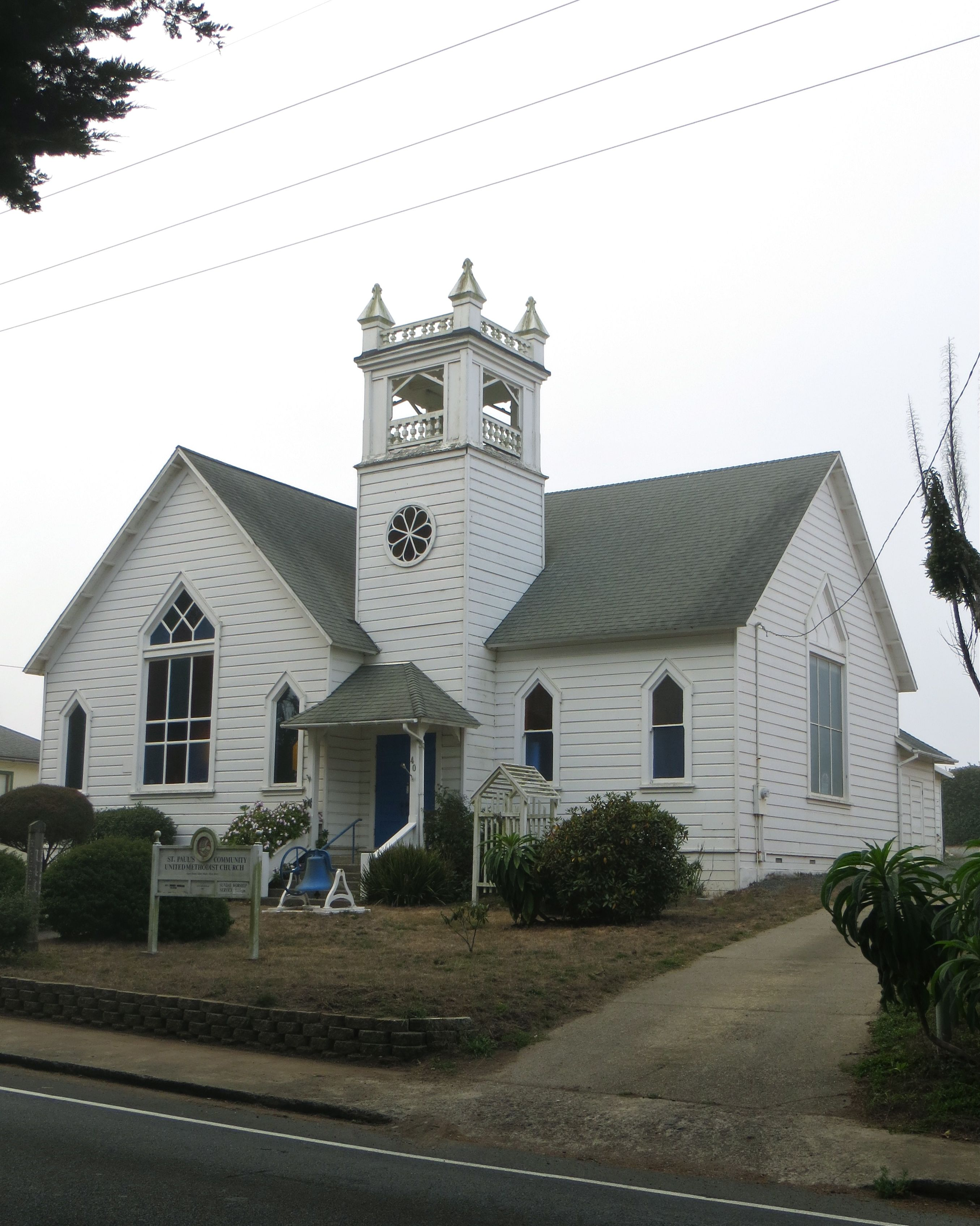

- Location within California Location within the United States
- Location: 40 School St., Point Arena, California
- Coordinates: 38°54′50″N 123°41′32″W
- Area: less than one acre
- Architectural style: Gothic
- MPS: Point Arena MPS
- NRHP reference No.: 90001366
- Added to NRHP: September 13, 1990

St. Paul's Methodist Episcopal Church (St. Paul's United Methodist Church) is a historic church at 40 School Street in Point Arena, California, United States. It was built in 1908 in a Gothic Revival style, and was added to the National Register of Historic Places in 1990. It is a one-story building with a T-shaped gable roof.
