= Buckridge Ranch House =

- U.S. National Register of Historic Places
- Location within California
- Nearest city: Point Arena, California
- Coordinates: 38°55′35″N 123°37′33″W
- Area: less than one acre
- Built: 1869
- Architectural style: I-house
- MPS: Point Arena MPS
- NRHP reference No.: 90001359
- Added to NRHP: September 13, 1990

The Buckridge Ranch House, near Point Arena, California, was built in 1869. It was listed on the National Register of Historic Places in 1990.

It is located on the Garcia River near Buckridge Road, about 5 miles (8.0 km) from Point Arena.

It is an I-house, apparently two rooms wide and one room deep.

Its significance is stated in the National Register nomination:

The Buckridge Ranch House is an excellent example of a building form that first arrived in the United States with English settlers in the seventeenth century and continued to be built in one guise or another for over 2OO years. This kind of building, called an I—house, has a rectangular form, two stories with two rooms on each, and a symmetrical facade. A side—facing gable roof is usually present. In the Virginia and the Carolinas a full—width front porch became a common feature. I—houses, like other early vernacular building types, used design principles that were of proven utility and were passed from builder to builder by word of mouth. The builder of the Buckridge Ranch House was probably not trying to design a house similar to those popular in the American Southeast. That was an unintended result of an effort to construct a simple, functional residence. The building displays all the characteristics of a Tidewater I-house (form, height, fenestration, roof, and porch) in an unusually pure example. The board-and-batten siding is typical of the early settlement of California, while the log porch supports add a rustic note. It is the only unadorned I—house in the Point Arena area.
