= Navarro (Albion, California) =

- U.S. National Register of Historic Places
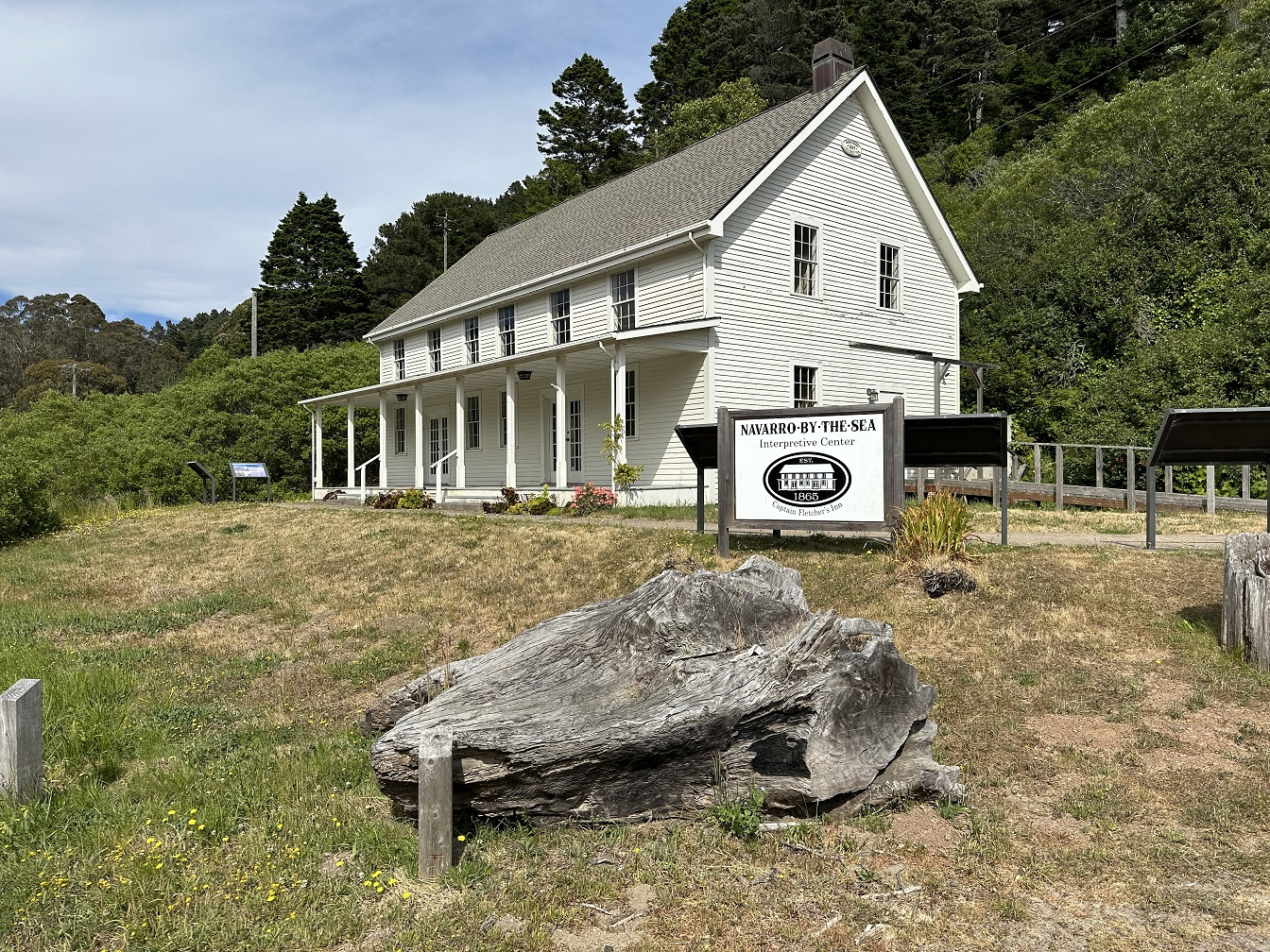

- Location within California Location within the United States
- Location: Navarro Beach Rd., Albion, California
- Coordinates: 39.193864°N 123.757221°W
- Area: 8.5 acres (3.4 ha)
- Built by: Charles Fletcher (Inn); Tichenor & Co. (Mill)
- Architectural style: Mid 19th Century Revival, Massed-Plan Type
- NRHP reference No.: 09001089
- Added to NRHP: December 21, 2009

Navarro, or Navarro-by-the-Sea, a historic site in Mendocino County, California, on Navarro Beach Rd. near Albion, California, was listed on the National Register of Historic Places in 2009. The listing was for two contributing buildings on 8.5 acres (3.4 ha).

It is located on Navarro Beach Road (possibly also called Navarro Bluff Road) near the mouth of the Navarro River.

The listing was the result of a nonprofit group's effort to preserve and restore two historic buildings. The project made some head-way, including getting the National Register listing, but failed in other respects. In 2019, there are renewed efforts, including a June 2019 event.

Navarro-by-the-Sea Center (NSCR), a 501(c)(3) nonprofit seeks to "save the two remaining historic structures of the original town of Navarro at the mouth of the Navarro River, and reopen them for public education, interpretation, and research."
