= Garcia River =

River on the northern coast of California

- Native name: Río García (Spanish); P'da Hau (Central Pomo)

Location
- Country: United States
- State: California
- Region: Mendocino County

Physical characteristics
- Source: Pardaloe Creek
  - coordinates: 38°52′02″N 123°17′0″W
- 2nd source: Mill Creek
  - coordinates: 38°54′41″N 123°17′33″W
- Source confluence: confluence
  - location: 8 miles (13 km) south of Boonville
  - coordinates: 38°53′48″N 123°22′1″W
  - elevation: 856 ft (261 m)
- Mouth: Pacific Ocean
  - location: Point Arena
  - coordinates: 38°57′16″N 123°44′1″W
  - elevation: 0 ft (0 m)
- Length: 44 mi (71 km)
- Basin size: 144 mi^{2} (370 km^{2})
- Discharge
  - location: near Point Arena
  - average: 342 cu ft/s (9.7 m^{3}/s)
  - minimum: 4.6 cu ft/s (0.13 m^{3}/s)
  - maximum: 30,300 cu ft/s (860 m^{3}/s)

Basin features
- Tributaries
  - left: Inman Creek
  - right: North Fork Garcia River

The Garcia River is a river on the northern coast of California, in southern Mendocino County. The river's watershed covers 144 square miles (370 km^{2}) and its mainstem is 44 miles (71 km) long. The watershed receives 45 inches (1,100 mm) of precipitation per year near the coast and 75 inches (1,900 mm) inland. The watershed's elevation ranges from sea level near the ocean to 2,470 feet (750 m) in the Coast Range. The Garcia River empties into the Pacific Ocean just north of Point Arena. This place is called P'da Hau in the Native California Indians' language who reside on the outlet of the coast.

It is named for the settler Rafael Garcia who was granted ownership of the land in 1844.

The river provides recreation, agricultural and industrial water supply for the community of Point Arena, California, and wildlife habitat including cold freshwater habitat for fish migration and spawning. Excessive erosion caused by logging, grazing and gravel mining is the most serious issue facing the Garcia River. Logging in the area began in the 19th century, but the most damage occurred in the decades after World War II. During this time, modern machinery was available, increasing production, but environmental regulations and industry good practices had not yet been developed. The river and its tributaries were often clogged with logging slash. In addition, skidding the logs over streams destroyed their protective vegetation. The streams were eventually cleared of this debris, naturally and through human efforts. Unfortunately, there is now a lack of large woody debris in the streams because of the extensive logging. This debris is needed for salmonid reproduction, to help prevent erosion and to create pool habitat for aquatic organisms.

About 80 percent of the land in the watershed is privately owned. Coast Forestlands is the largest landowner in the area, followed by Louisiana Pacific and Mailliard Ranch. There are several more large landowners that own the bulk of the rest. However, some land of the land consists of private residences and small ranches and farms. Public access to the river and the rest of the watershed is limited due to this private ownership.

== Course ==
The Point Arena Hot Springs was a popular resort located along the Garcia River in the early 20th century. The springs are now used by backpackers.

From the confluence of Pardaloe Creek and Mill Creek, about 8 miles (13 km) south of Boonville, California, the Garcia River descends to the west. After receiving water from Inman Creek, it turns northwestward along the San Andreas Fault rift zone. Then the North Fork Garcia River enters from the right. Just south of Mountain View Road, it turns westward again, flowing under State Route 1 at milepost 18.5. It discharges into the Pacific Ocean between Point Arena and Manchester State Beach.

== See also ==
- Buckridge Ranch House, overlooks the river
- List of rivers in California
- Manchester Band of Pomo Indians of the Manchester Rancheria
- Point Arena Hot Springs
