= Manchester Schoolhouse =

- U.S. National Register of Historic Places
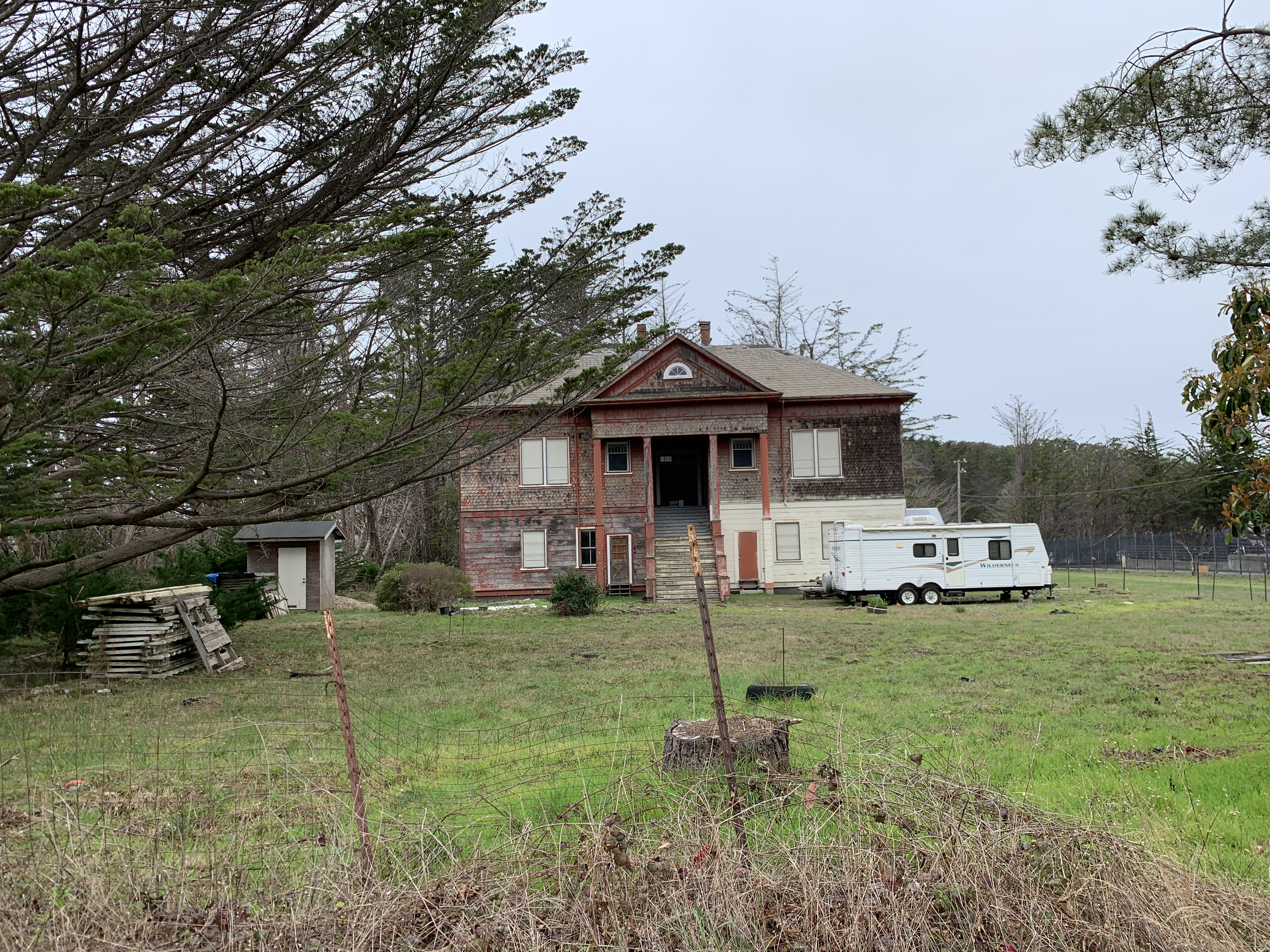

- Location within California
- Location: 19750 CA 1, Manchester, California
- Coordinates: 38°58′01″N 123°41′10″W
- Area: 1 acre (0.40 ha)
- Built: 1907
- Built by: George Clement
- Architectural style: Mixed (more Than 2 Styles From Different Periods)
- NRHP reference No.: 79000499
- Added to NRHP: June 26, 1979

The Manchester Schoolhouse, at 19750 California State Route 1 in Manchester, California, was built in 1907, the year after the 1906 San Francisco earthquake. It was listed on the National Register of Historic Places in 1979.

It is a two-story wood-frame building, about 64.5 by 32.5 feet (19.7 m × 9.9 m) in plan, with a hipped roof. It served as a school and also as a meeting hall for the city.

It was deemed "significant as the only public building in Manchester surviving from the days when coastal logging was a prolific and flourishing industry. The school's design is notable as an outstanding example of North Coast school architecture and for its inclusion of a community/use/school use meeting room."
