= Weller House (Fort Bragg, California) =

Historic house in California, United States

- U.S. National Register of Historic Places
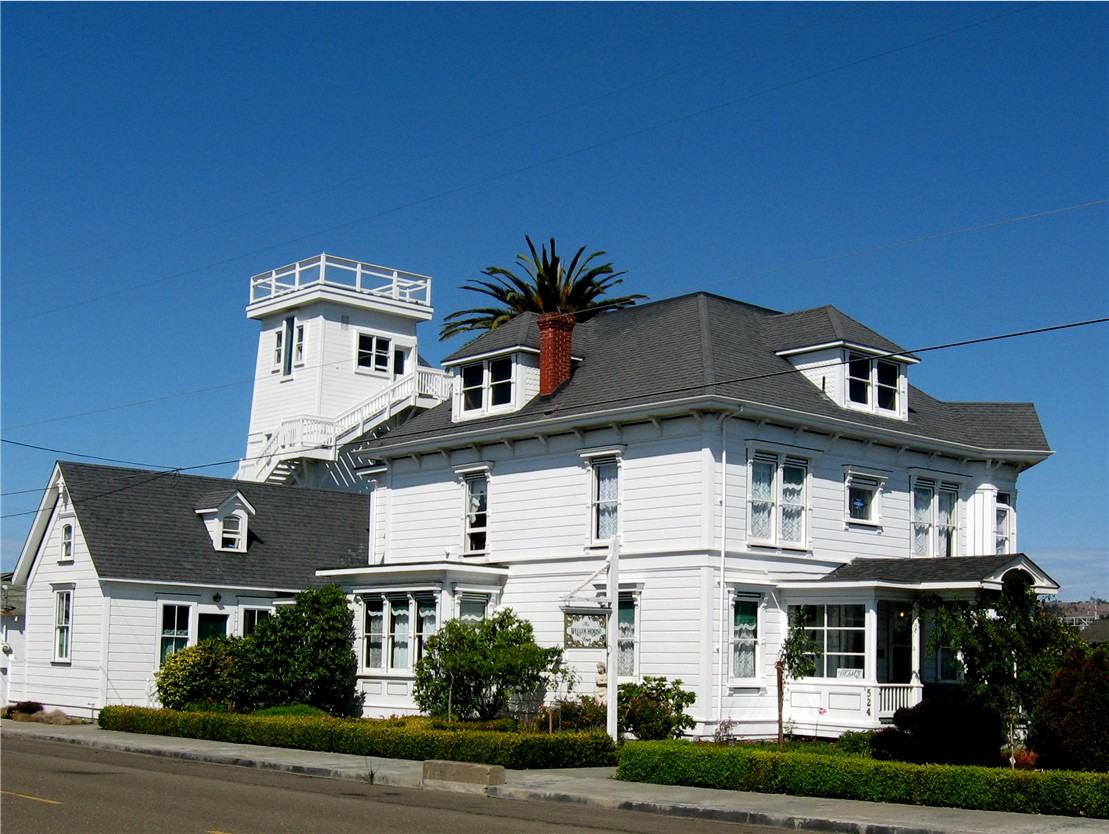
- Weller House as seen from the southwest

- Location within Northern California Location within the United States
- Location: 524 Stewart Street; Fort Bragg, California, United States
- Coordinates: 39.44741°N 123.80703°W
- Built: 1886
- Architectural style: Victorian
- Website: www.wellerhouse.com
- NRHP reference No.: 76000499
- Added to NRHP: July 19, 1976

The Weller House, located at 524 Stewart Street in Fort Bragg, California, is a historic Victorian house that is operating as a bed & breakfast.

The oldest building in the city, it was built in 1886 for Horace Alanson Weller Sr., a prominent figure in the early history of Fort Bragg who was manager of the Union Lumber Company Store then co-founder of the town's first bank. Expanded a year later, it came to include three stories with 10 rooms totaling 10,000 square feet (930 m^{2}), including a 900 square feet (84 m^{2}) ballroom. It is centrally located in Fort Bragg's oldest residential neighborhood, which also came to be known by the name Weller, occupying four contiguous city lots with 200 feet (61 m) of frontage and a total area of 0.5 acres (0.20 ha).

It was listed on the National Register of Historic Places in 1976. The listing included two contributing buildings and one other contributing structure.
