= California State Route 255 =

Highway in California

State Route 255
- SR 255 highlighted in red

Route information
- Maintained by Caltrans
- Length: 8.789 mi (14.145 km)

Major junctions
- South end: US 101 in Eureka
- North end: US 101 in Arcata

Location
- Country: United States
- State: California
- Counties: Humboldt

Highway system
- State highways in California; Interstate; US; State; Scenic; History; Pre‑1964; Unconstructed; Deleted; Freeways
← SR 254	→ SR 256

State Route 255 (SR 255) is a state highway in the U.S. state of California. It is a loop route of U.S. Route 101 in Humboldt County that runs through the Samoa Peninsula on the western side of Humboldt Bay.

== Route description ==
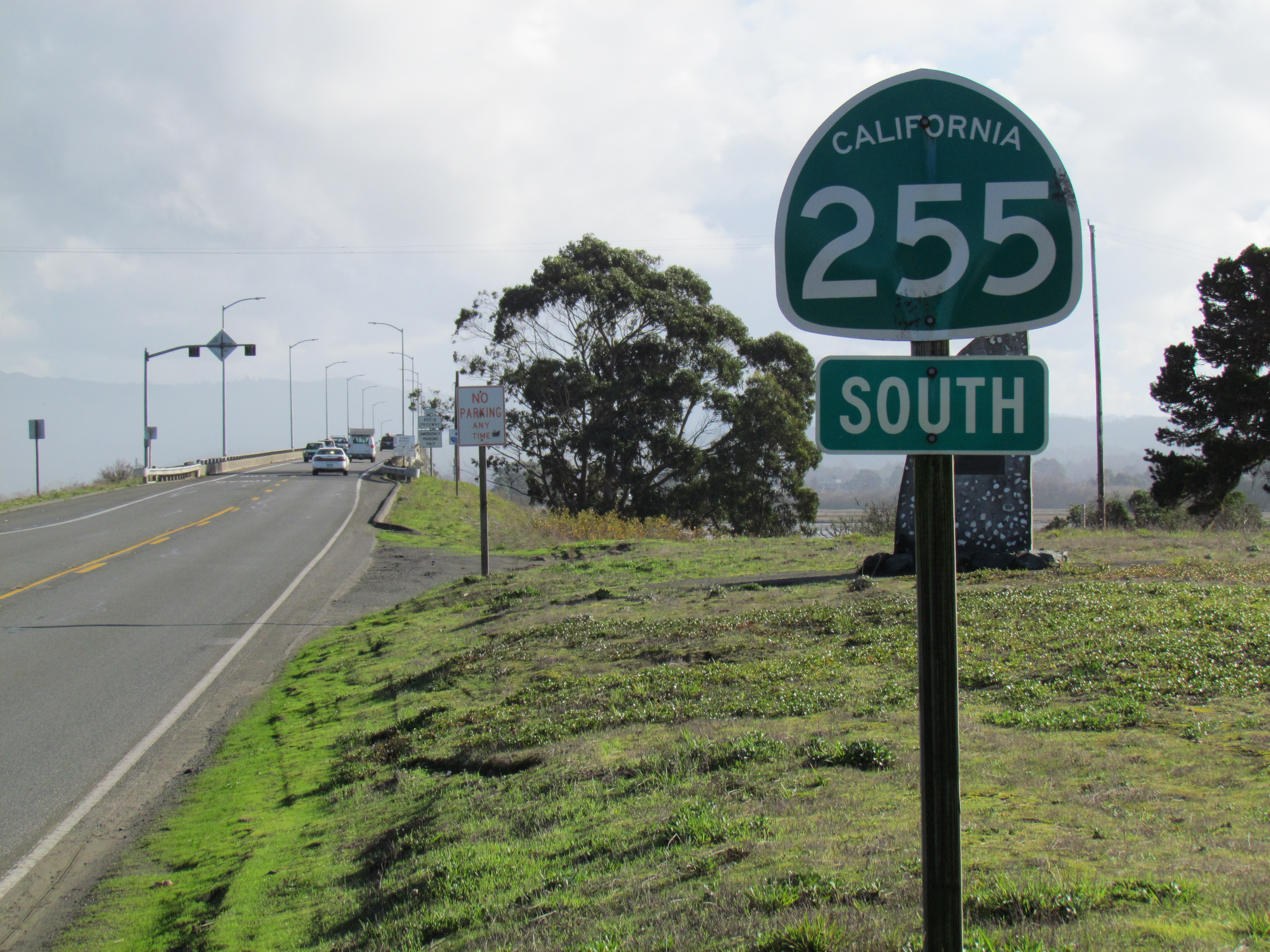
Samoa Peninsula approach to northernmost span of the Samoa Bridge (at milemarker 2.03).

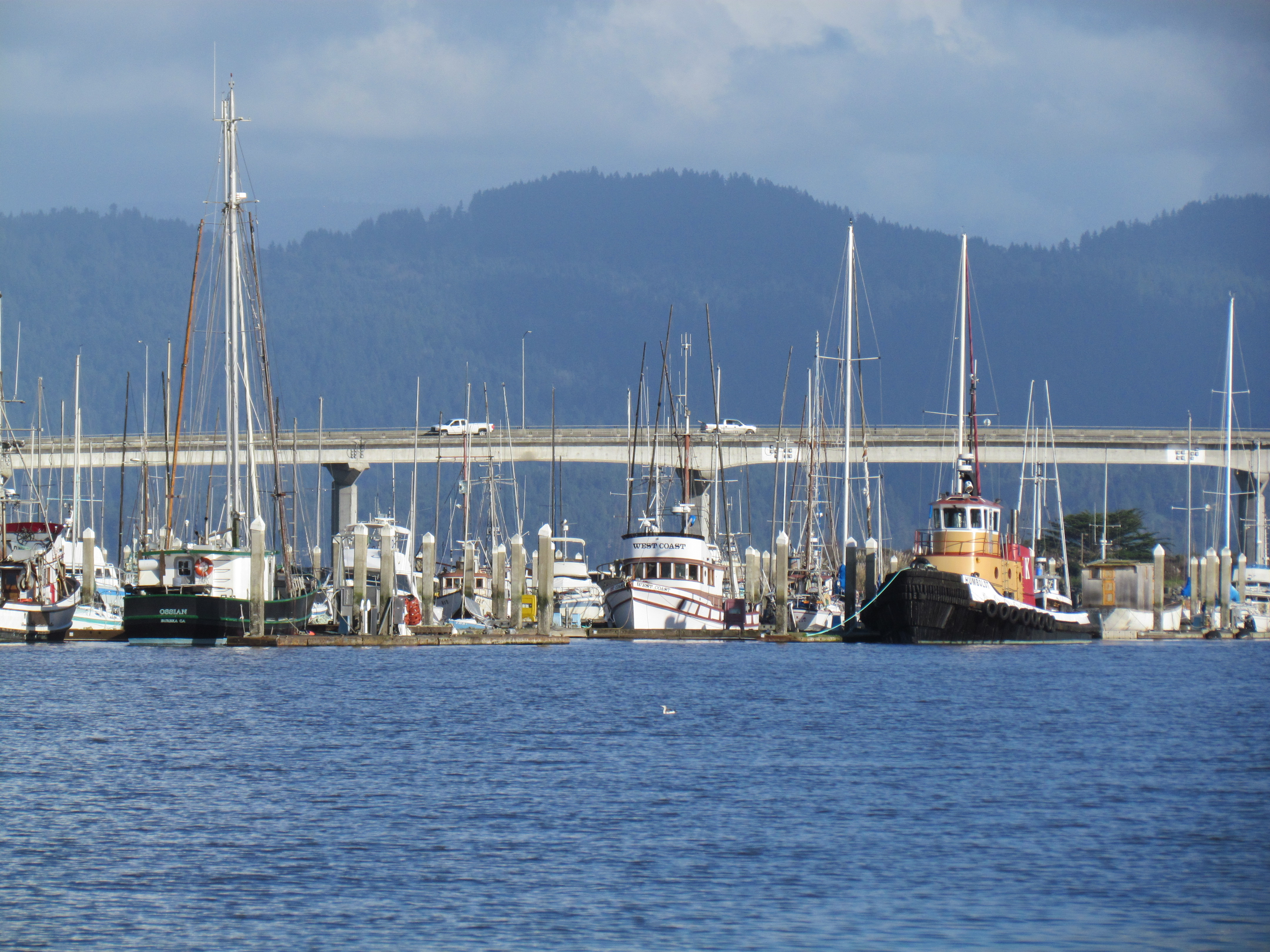
View of southernmost span of the "Samoa Bridge." Woodley Island Marina (on Humboldt Bay), Eureka, in the foreground with easterly views of Fickle Hill (Coast Ranges) in the background.

Route 255 is defined in section 555 of the California Streets and Highways Code, and that the highway is "from Route 101 in Eureka to Route 101 in Arcata via the Humboldt Bay Bridge and the Samoa Peninsula".

SR 255 is a western alternate route of U.S. Route 101 between Eureka and Arcata, routed via the three bridges over Humboldt Bay and Tuluwat Island and Woodley Islands, rather than motorists having to circumvent the entire northern section of the bay (known as Arcata Bay) to the road connecting the Arcata area to the Samoa Peninsula. In literature and locally, the portion of the road crossing Humboldt Bay (on three separate bridges) is known collectively as the "Samoa Bridge". The bridge is considered a two-lane freeway with no median barrier. However, when Caltrans implemented its exit numbering program, SR 255's section was not included, and is one of the very few stretches of freeway in California to not have exit numbers posted.

Highway 255 provides direct access to industrial operations on the Samoa Peninsula and the communities of Samoa, Fairhaven, and Manila, all of which are located on the Samoa Peninsula, with the entire combined area located within Greater Eureka.

SR 255 is part of the National Highway System, a network of highways that are considered essential to the country's economy, defense, and mobility by the Federal Highway Administration.

== History ==
Before the Samoa Bridge (actually three spans) was completed in 1971, direct access to Samoa from Eureka was by boat or on a fleet of small ferries constructed on the bay or the original circuitous route. The original alternative was a relatively extensive route which took drivers north to Arcata and then around the bay to the northern peninsula before reaching the heavily industrialized area adjacent to Eureka. Completion of the Samoa Bridge and the creation and designation of Highway 255, completed a circle around Arcata Bay by connecting to the New Navy Base Road (a portion now designated as 255), along the peninsula connecting Samoa to the Eureka shore of the bay. This resulted in making the ferry system obsolete. However, one ferry, the Madaket, continues operating as a tour boat on Humboldt Bay.

== Major intersections ==
Except where prefixed with a letter, postmiles were measured on the road as it was in 1964, based on the alignment that existed at the time, and do not necessarily reflect current mileage. Postmile prefixes include: R reflecting a realignment in the route since then, M indicating a second realignment, L referring to an overlap due to a correction or change, and T indicating postmiles classified as temporary. Segments that remain unconstructed or have been relinquished to local control may be omitted. The entire route is in Humboldt County.

Location	Postmile	Destinations	Notes
Eureka	0.00	Myrtle Avenue	Continuation beyond US 101; serves Providence St. Joseph Hospital
Eureka	0.00	US 101 north (5th Street)	One-way street; south end of SR 255
Eureka	0.05	US 101 south (4th Street)	One way street
Eureka		South end of freeway	
Eureka	0.20	Samoa Bridge (south span) over the Eureka Channel of Humboldt Bay	
Eureka	0.66	Woodley Island Marina	Interchange
	0.67	Samoa Bridge (middle span) over the Middle Channel of Humboldt Bay	
	1.37	Samoa Bridge (north span) over the Samoa Channel of Humboldt Bay	
		North end of freeway	
	2.03	New Navy Base Road – Samoa	
Arcata	8.36	K Street	Serves Mad River Community Hospital
Arcata	8.80	US 101 (Redwood Highway) – Crescent City, Eureka	Interchange; north end of SR 255; US 101 exit 713
Arcata	8.80	Samoa Boulevard – Sunny Brae	Continuation beyond US 101
1.000 mi = 1.609 km; 1.000 km = 0.621 mi: Incomplete access
