= Humboldt Bay Harbor Recreation & Conservation District =

Coordinates: 40.75°N 124.22°W

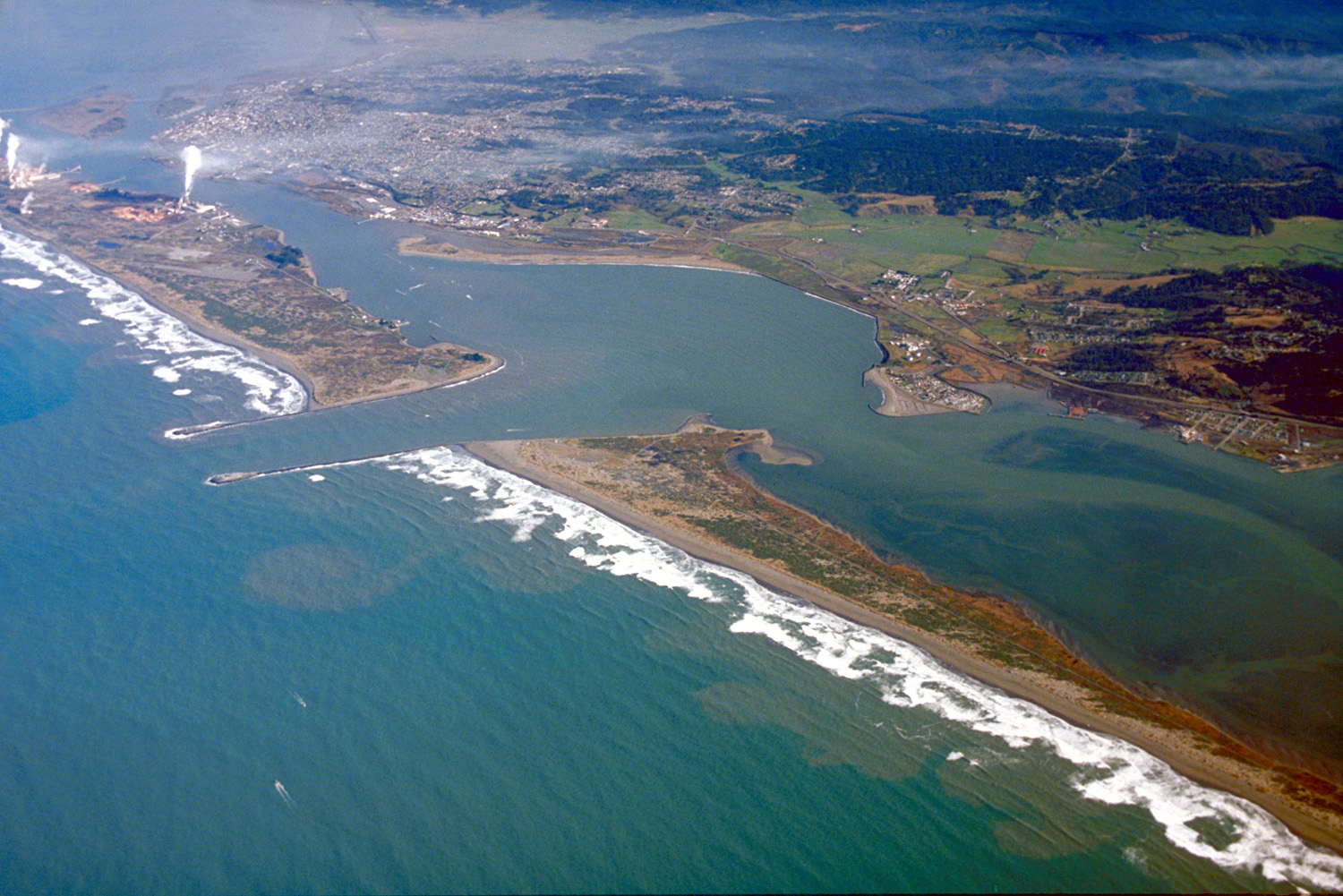
Aerial view of Humboldt Bay, the Port facilities (primarily in the upper left of photo) and the City of Eureka, California

The Humboldt Bay Harbor Recreation & Conservation District (HBHRCD) is the governing body of the Port of Humboldt Bay, a deep water port, and the Port of Eureka in Humboldt County, California, United States. Created in 1972 by local voters, its facilities include those in Eureka (Port of Eureka), the principal city of the region, and much larger facilities in the smaller unincorporated communities Samoa, Fairhaven, and Fields Landing (all in Greater Eureka) on the shore of the adjacent peninsula, known as Samoa. The District is responsible for the immediate environs of Humboldt Bay (including marsh lands, estuaries, etc.) and all improvements and facilities located at Shelter Cove, a small oceanside facility and dock in southern Humboldt County. Due to conditions at the Bar (entrance to Humboldt Bay), only pilots trained and employed by the District are used to bring vessels beyond a certain size into or out of the harbor unless the ship's pilot has proper certification.

Humboldt Bay's second largest enclosed natural bay, located on the Northern California coast, approximately 225 miles (362 km) north of San Francisco and 156 nautical miles (289 km) south of Coos Bay, Oregon, is 14 miles long and contains the only large deep water port for the entirety of Northern California north of San Francisco Bay.
