= Humboldt Bay Maritime Museum =

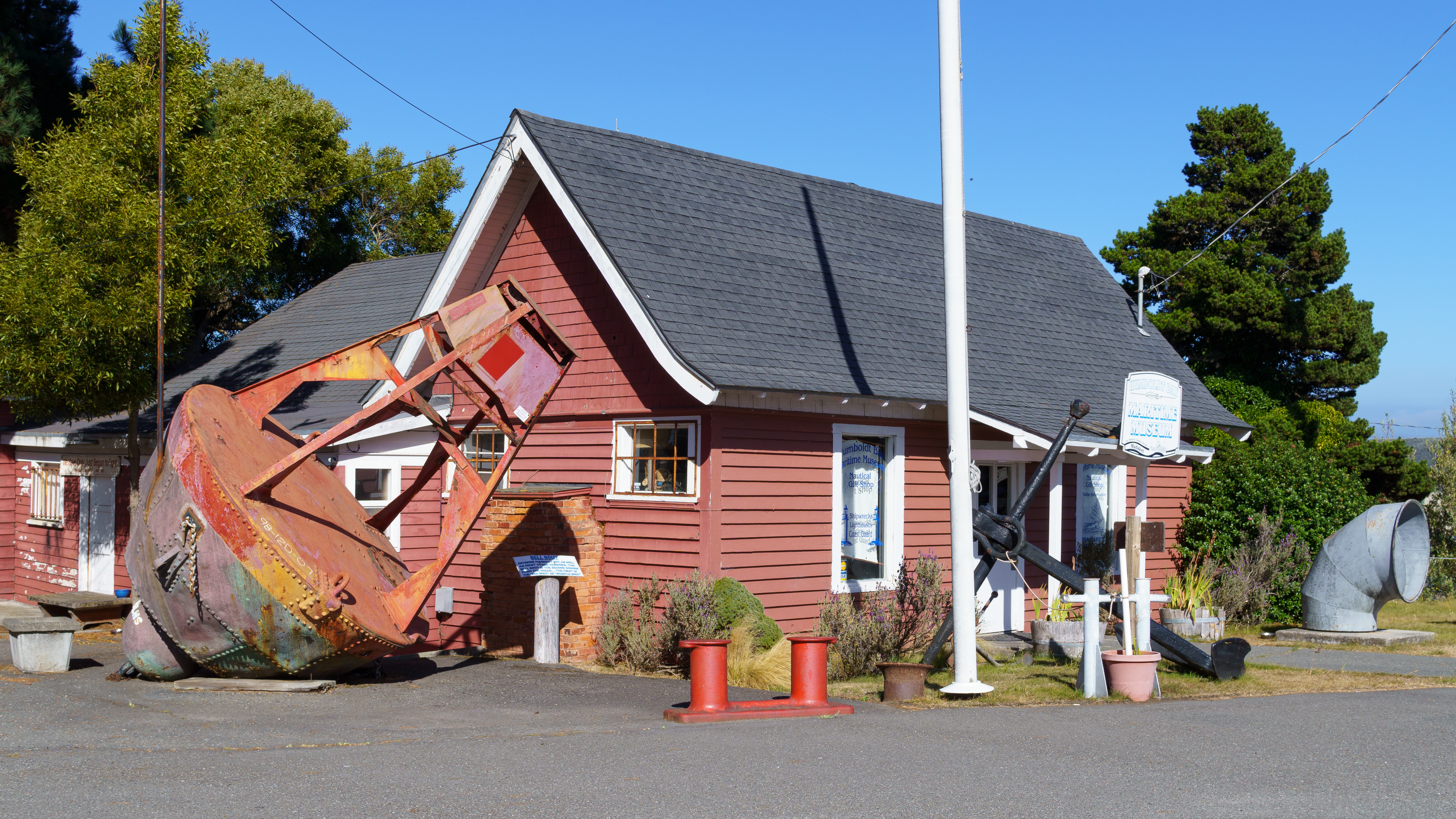
- The museum in August 2020
- Location: 77 Cookhouse Rd; Samoa, California, United States
- Coordinates: 40°49′12.37″N 124°10′53.8″W
- Type: Maritime museum
- Website: http://www.humboldtbaymaritimemuseum.com

The Humboldt Bay Maritime Museum is located in Samoa, California, a small town across Humboldt Bay from Eureka. The focus of the museum is the preservation and interpretation of its collection of artifacts, photographs, library archives and materials which relate principally to the maritime history of California's North Coast. The museum is located in what was the head cook's house next to the Samoa Cookhouse and was founded in 1977.

A cornerstone of the Museum collection is its excursion boat, the MV Madaket. The 1910 ferry was originally built on Humboldt Bay with five other similar boats designed to transport Eureka's mill workers to and from lumber operations across Humboldt Bay. Originally christened the "Nellie C" after a member of the Cousins family which built her, she served as a ferry boat from Table Bluff, Fields Landing, Eureka, Samoa and Arcata until 1972 when she was the last to be put out of daily use due to construction of the Samoa Bridge which made the commute faster by car. Now rebuilt and also the oldest operating passenger vessel in the nation still providing passenger service, she provides visitors the opportunity to see Eureka and the port from her decks, while experiencing a narrative of the history of the port and city, the founding and fortune of both and an opportunity to visit her onboard tavern, the smallest licensed bar in California.

== See also ==
- Clarke Historical Museum
- List of Museums in the North Coast (California)
- Humboldt County Historical Society
- List of maritime museums in the United States
