= Samoa, California =

Samoa
- census-designated place
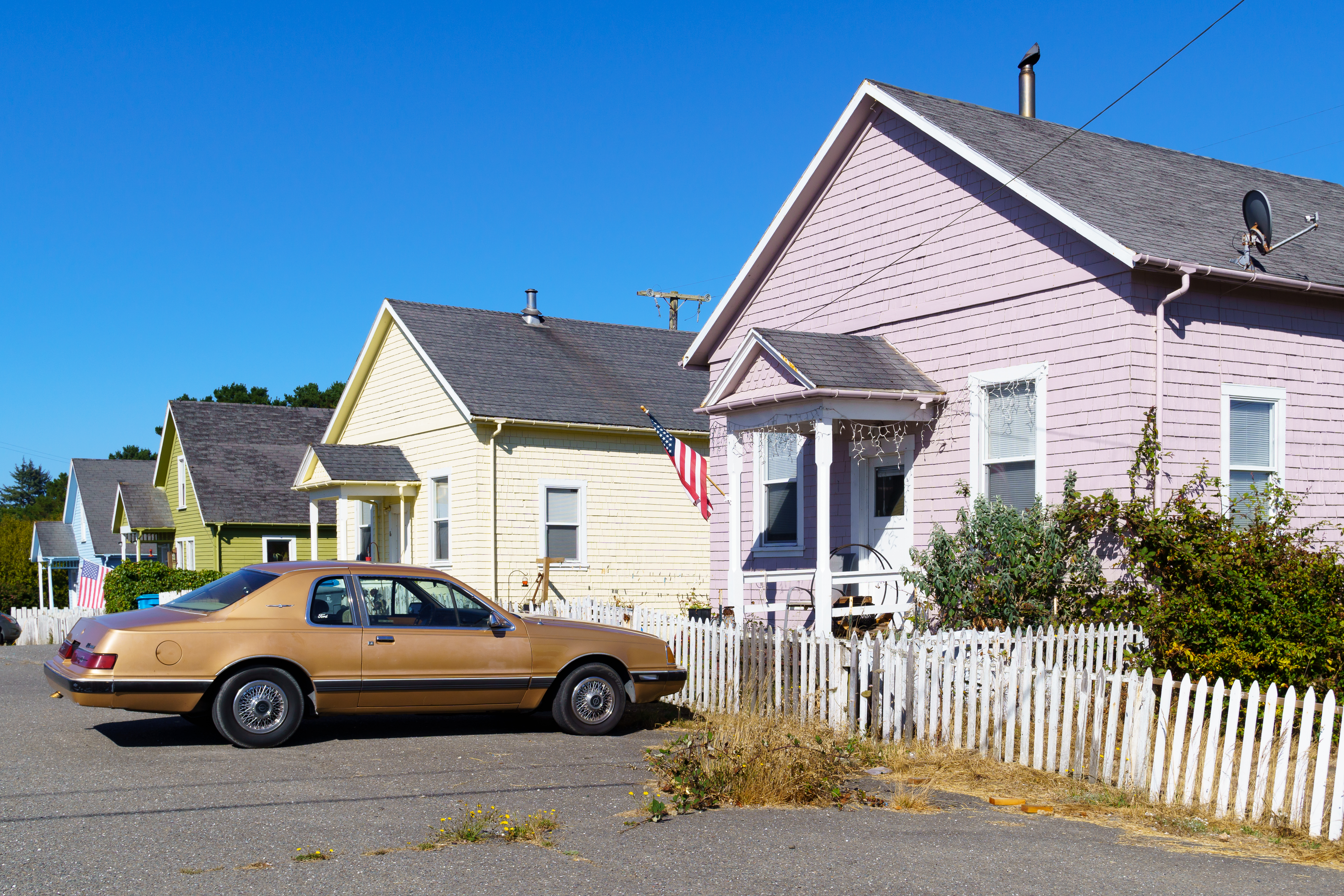
- Houses in Samoa, August 2020

- Location in California
- Coordinates: 40°49′07″N 124°11′11″W
- Country: United States
- State: California
- County: Humboldt

Area
  - Total: 0.837 sq mi (2.168 km^{2})
  - Land: 0.837 sq mi (2.168 km^{2})
  - Water: 0 sq mi (0 km^{2}) 0%
- Elevation: 23 ft (7 m)

Population (2020)
  - Total: 229
  - Density: 274/sq mi (106/km^{2})
- Time zone: UTC-8 (Pacific (PST))
  - Summer (DST): UTC-7 (PDT)
- ZIP code: 95564
- Area code: 707
- GNIS feature IDs: 1656274; 2628788

Samoa (formerly Brownsville) is a census-designated place in Humboldt County, California, United States. It is located 1.5 miles (2.4 km) northwest of Eureka, at an elevation of 23 feet (7 m). Samoa is located in the northern peninsula of Humboldt Bay and is the site of the Samoa Cookhouse, one of the last remaining original lumber camp–style cookhouses. The name Samoa is used interchangeably to refer to the peninsula it occupies. The population was 229 at the 2020 census.

== Etymology ==
Samoa was given its current name in honor of a contemporary crisis in the Samoan Islands in 1890s. It was assumed that its harbor was similar to the harbor of Pago Pago in American Samoa, and the town was consequentially named Samoa. It was originally known as Brownsville, named for James D.H. Brown, who was the owner of a dairy ranch established in 1859.

== History ==
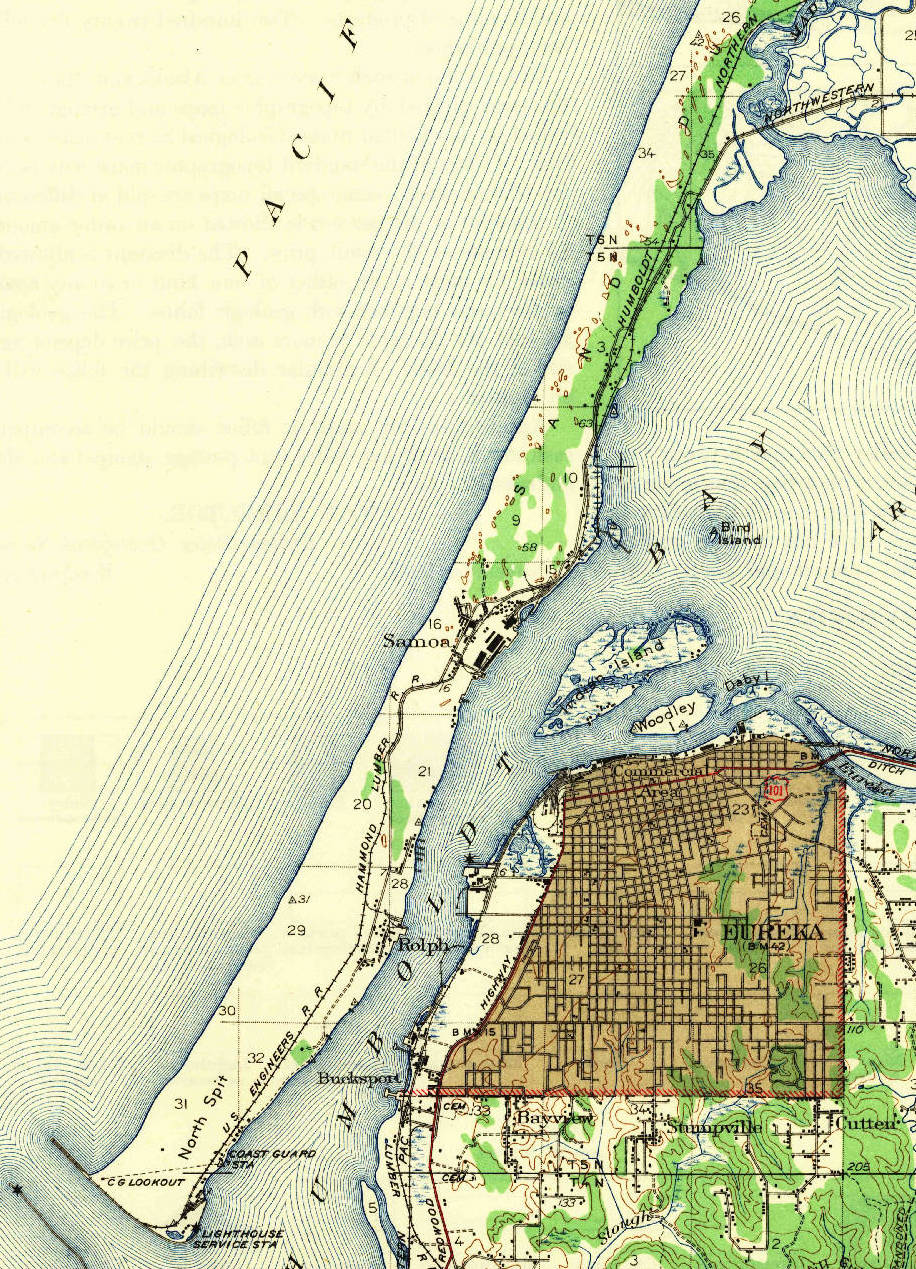
Rail line ran along the split west of Eureka; 1942

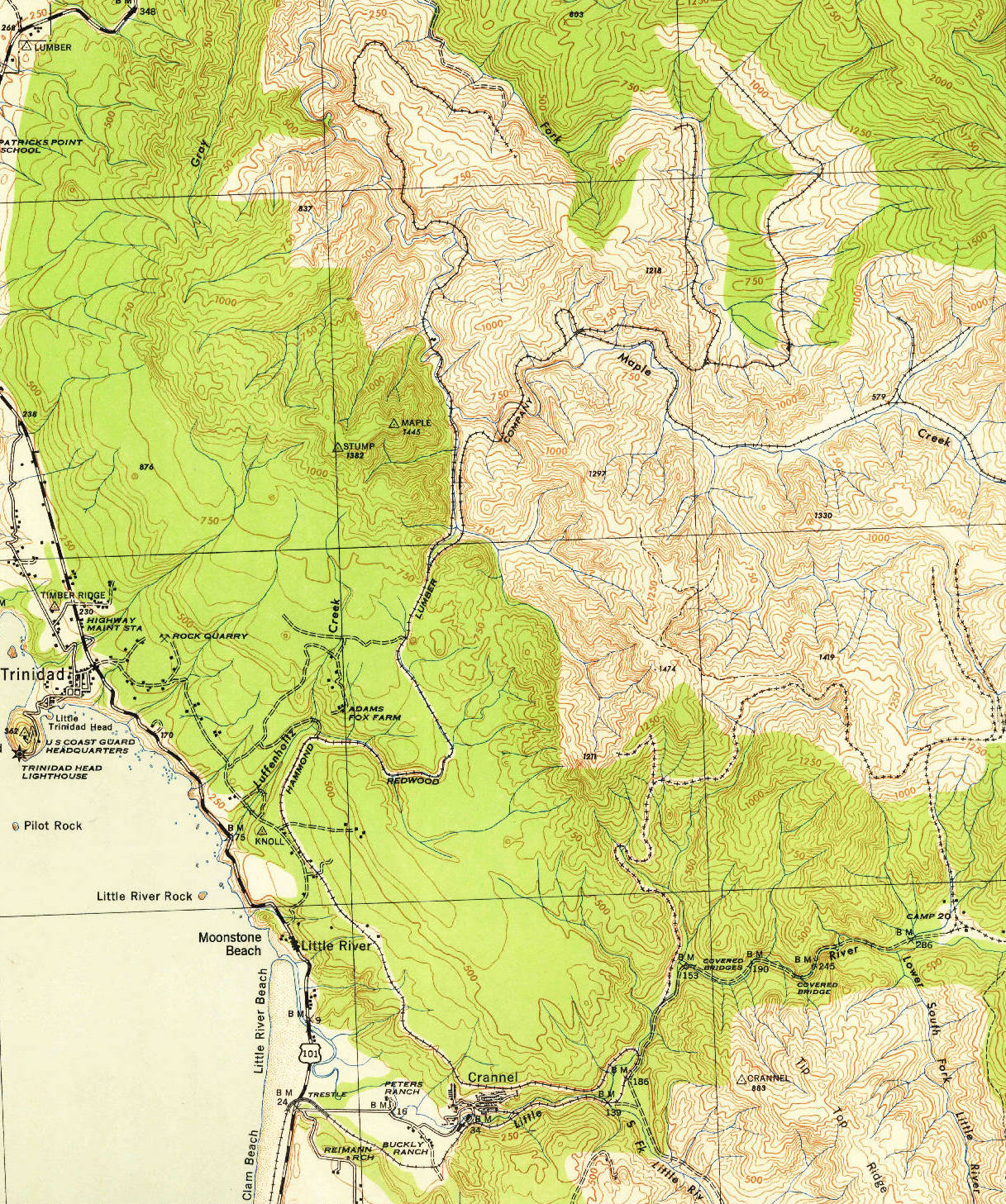
The timber came from the mountains east of Trinidad

Prior to private settlement of the area, the north spit at the entrance to Humboldt Bay was used by a series of federal government projects including the 1851 to 1892 Humboldt Harbor Light; in 1862, a prisoner of war camp for Native Americans captured in the Bald Hills War; the Humboldt Bay Life-Saving Station in 1878; and the stonemason finishing yard and trans-shipment point for foundation stones for the St. George Reef Light from 1883 to 1891 at Paysonville.

The nongovernmental settlement was named Brownsville after James Henry Brown, a dairy farmer who settled his ranch on the present site of Samoa in 1865. James Brown was the first permanent white settler on the north peninsula of Humboldt Bay. He was born in Quincy, Illinois, in 1830 and came to Humboldt County in 1853, until a group of Eureka businessmen formed the Samoa Land and Improvement Company in 1889. Vance Lumber Company purchased the Humboldt Bay frontage from Samoa Land and Improvement Company for construction of a large sawmill in 1892. Eureka and Klamath River Railroad was chartered in 1893 to connect the Samoa sawmill and associated worker housing facilities to the city of Arcata and timberlands near the Mad River. The Samoa sawmill was the largest in Humboldt County when purchased by Andrew B. Hammond in 1900. The Samoa post office opened in 1894.

A sash and door factory was added to the mill complex by 1909, and the company was reorganized as the Hammond Lumber Company in 1912. Hammond Lumber Company built an emergency shipyard during World War I, and seven wooden steam-ships were built at Samoa between 1917 and 1919. The 1921–22 Belcher Atlas of Humboldt County breaks down private and commercial land ownership throughout the county, showing that by 1922, the region of Samoa was parceled into an extractive resource industry. The largest tracts of land belonged to Hammond Lumber Company, while other enterprises included the Little River Redwood Company, the San Francisco Land Company, Big Lagoon Lumber Company, and Dolbeer & Carson Lumber Company, the latter owning the northerly marsh inlets stretching between the modern-day Arcata Bottoms and Mad River. Hammond Lumber Company railroads brought logs and lumber to Samoa from Little River and Big Lagoon until the railway trestles were destroyed by wildfire in 1945.

Georgia-Pacific Corporation purchased the Samoa sawmill complex in 1956 and began operation of a plywood mill in 1958. A modern sawmill replaced the original sawmill facilities in 1964. A pulp mill began operation in 1965. Some of the older worker housing was razed during construction of modern mill facilities, but the Samoa Cookhouse was preserved. The Samoa mill complex was transferred to Louisiana-Pacific Corporation during a Federal Trade Commission action initiated in 1972 The last old-growth timber was milled in 1980, and the area was set for sale in 2001. The pulp mill was closed by its final owners in 2010.

== Samoa Peninsula ==
The coastal bar separating Humboldt Bay from the Pacific Ocean has been breached by a dredged channel to allow commercial shipping to enter the bay. The tips of the north and south jetties have unusual concrete breakers known as dolos, which resemble toy jacks. The breakers were built by the United States Army Corps of Engineers to withstand the area's heavy seas, and were featured by Huell Howser on PBS's California's Gold (Episode #803). Samoa peninsula includes the Manila and Samoa Dunes (some of the most ecologically diverse areas in California) and stretches to the Arcata Bottoms. The peninsula is about 10 miles (16 km) long by 1 mile (1.6 km). This area is vulnerable to tsunamis as its average elevation above sea level is only 3 feet (0.91 m). It also contains the unincorporated community of Manila and a United States Coast Guard station. Residential expansion is proposed that would double the size of Manila, which currently has neither fire or police services of its own. The ZIP Code is 95564. The community is inside area code 707.

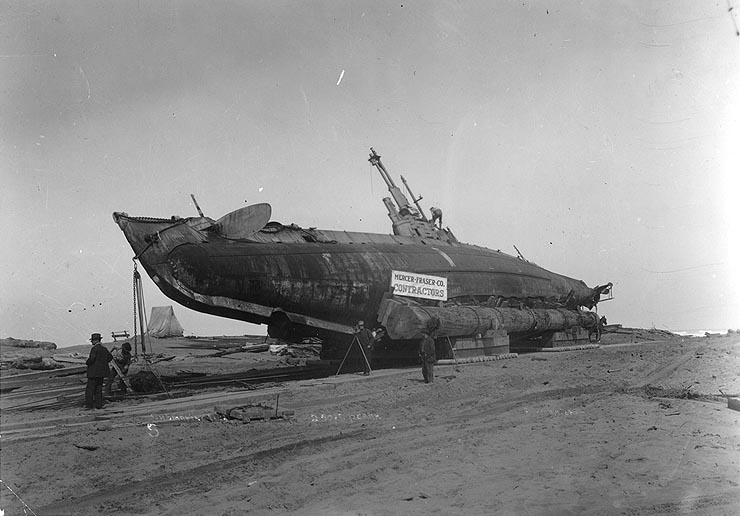
USS H-3 Beached at Samoa April 6, 1917

The seaward side of the peninsula is Samoa Beach. The great green combers of winter gales hump and crest about a half-mile offshore where the 30-foot (9.1 m) swell curve parallels the shoreline. During such storms, little can be seen between the breakers and the beach except the smoky spume of crests blown off by the wind. Varying currents and a high incidence of foggy days caused mariners to call the approach to Humboldt Bay a "graveyard of the Pacific" in days before modern navigational aids were available. Even when the fog bank was no more than a threat on the horizon, landmarks on the higher ground east of Humboldt Bay were obscured by a low overcast of smoke from lumber mills and homes using wood fuel.

Despite the construction of the Humboldt Harbor Light and the Table Bluff Light at least twenty-seven vessels had gone ashore in this vicinity before the cruiser USS Milwaukee (C-21) grounded here on January 13, 1917, and broke up in the pounding surf. The cruiser, disregarding recommendations of local mariners, was attempting to salvage the submarine USS H-3 (SS-30). The submarine had gone aground on December 15, 1916; and its crew were living in tents on the beach. The submarine was later salvaged by the Mercer-Fraser Company building a track of balks across the Samoa peninsula and jacking the submarine up onto rollers to be towed across and relaunched into Humboldt Bay.

== Climate ==
This region experiences warm (but not hot) and dry summers, with no average monthly temperatures above 71.6 °F and cold, rainy winters that include a layer of morning fog. According to the Köppen Climate Classification system, Samoa has a warm-summer Mediterranean climate, abbreviated "Csb" on climate maps.

== Demographics ==
Historical population
Census	Pop.	Note	%±
2010	258		—
2020	229		−11.2%
U.S. Decennial Census; 1860–1870 1880-1890; 1900 1910 1920; 1930 1940 1950; 1960 1970 1980; 1990 2000 2010

Samoa first appeared as a census designated place in the 2010 U.S. census.

The 2020 United States census reported that Samoa had a population of 229. The population density was 273.6 inhabitants per square mile (105.6/km^{2}). The racial makeup of Samoa was 178 (77.7%) White, 6 (2.6%) African American, 9 (3.9%) Native American, 0 (0.0%) Asian, 5 (2.2%) Pacific Islander, 8 (3.5%) from other races, and 23 (10.0%) from two or more races. Hispanic or Latino of any race were 19 persons (8.3%).

The whole population lived in households. There were 87 households, out of which 17 (19.5%) had children under the age of 18 living in them, 26 (29.9%) were married-couple households, 23 (26.4%) were cohabiting couple households, 15 (17.2%) had a female householder with no partner present, and 23 (26.4%) had a male householder with no partner present. 23 households (26.4%) were one person, and 10 (11.5%) were one person aged 65 or older. The average household size was 2.63. There were 43 families (49.4% of all households).

The age distribution was 50 people (21.8%) under the age of 18, 28 people (12.2%) aged 18 to 24, 83 people (36.2%) aged 25 to 44, 44 people (19.2%) aged 45 to 64, and 24 people (10.5%) who were 65 years of age or older. The median age was 32.1 years. There were 131 males and 98 females.

There were 91 housing units at an average density of 108.7 units per square mile (42.0 units/km^{2}), of which 87 (95.6%) were occupied. Of these, 35 (40.2%) were owner-occupied, and 52 (59.8%) were occupied by renters.

== Politics ==
In the state legislature, Samoa is in the 2nd senatorial district, represented by Democrat Mike McGuire, and the 2nd Assembly district, represented by Democrat Chris Rogers.

Federally, it is in California's 2nd congressional district, represented by Democrat Jared Huffman.

== In popular culture ==
In the 1986 movie My Chauffeur, a woman named Casey Meadows, played by Deborah Foreman, has to chauffeur Battle Witherspoon, played by Sam J. Jones to Samoa, while on their way the car breaks down.

== See also ==
- Humboldt Bay Maritime Museum
- Humboldt Bay Life-Saving Station
- California State Route 255
- Northwestern Pacific Railroad

== Sources ==
- "Samoa California - Eureka Community on Humboldt Bay". Archived from the original on February 6, 2006.
- "The Humboldt Visitor - Manila Dunes on Humboldt Bay". Archived from the original on October 25, 2000.
