= Humboldt Bay =

Bay on the North Coast of California

- Wigi (Wiyot)
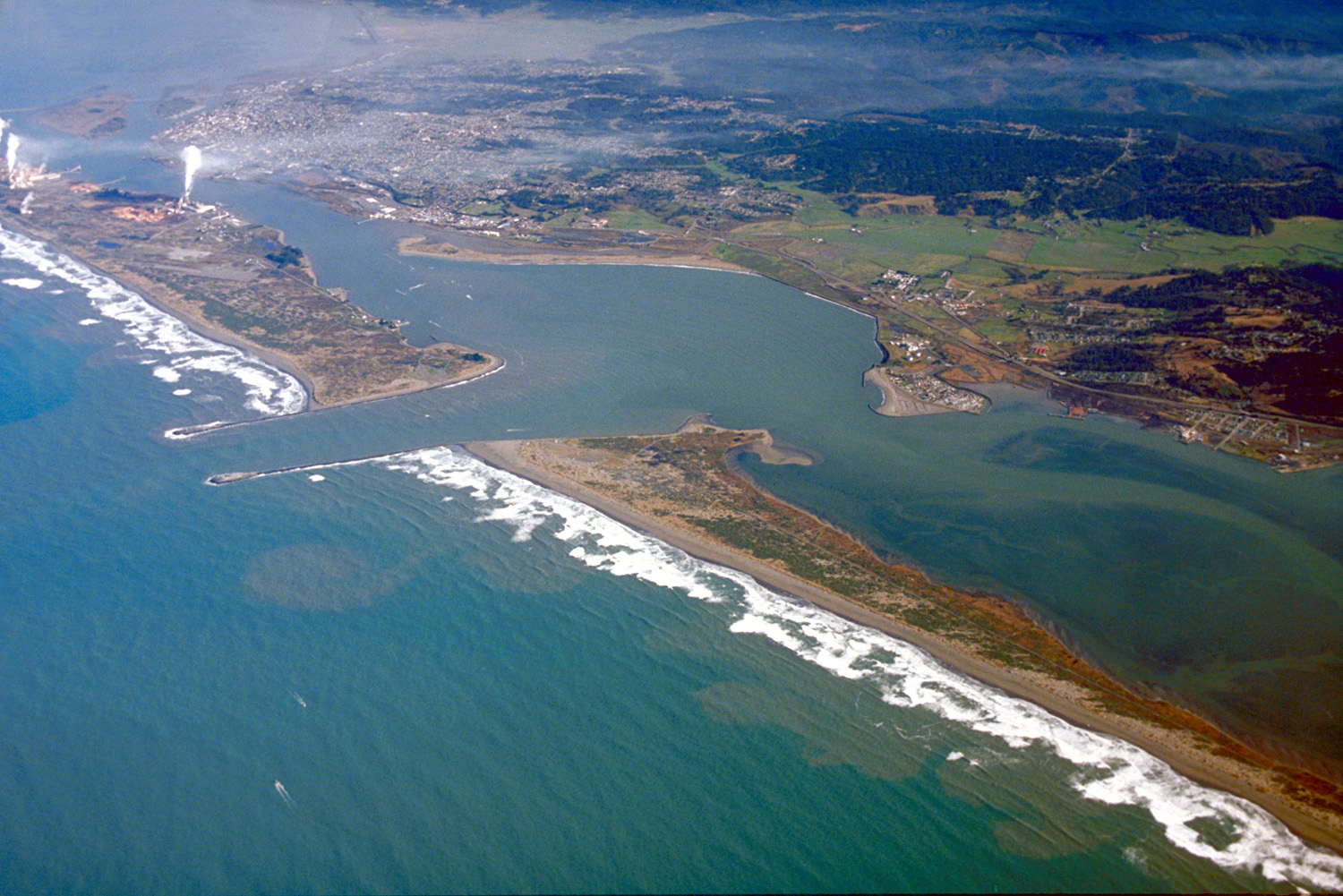
- Aerial view of Humboldt Bay and the City of Eureka

- Location within California
- Location: Humboldt County, North Coast, California
- Coordinates: 40°44′08″N 124°13′49″W
- River sources: Elk River; Jacoby, Freshwater, and Salmon Creeks.
- Ocean/sea sources: Pacific
- Basin countries: United States
- Max. length: 14 miles (23 km)
- Max. width: 4.5 miles (7 km)
- Surface area: 13 square miles (34 km^{2})/25.5 square miles (66 km^{2}) (min/max tide) (17,000 acres)
- Average depth: 11 feet (3.4 m)
- Max. depth: 40 feet (12 m) (dredged)
- Islands: Tuluwat Island, Woodley Island, Daby Island
- Settlements: Eureka, Arcata

California Historical Landmark
- Official name: Humboldt Harbor Historical District
- Reference no.: 882

Humboldt Bay (Wiyot: Wigi) is a natural bay and a multi-basin, bar-built coastal lagoon located on the rugged North Coast of California, entirely within Humboldt County, United States. It is the largest protected body of water on the West Coast between San Francisco Bay and Puget Sound, the second-largest enclosed bay in California, and the largest port between San Francisco and Coos Bay, Oregon. The largest city adjoining the bay is Eureka, the regional center and county seat of Humboldt County, followed by the city of Arcata. These primary cities, together with adjoining unincorporated communities and several small towns, make up the Humboldt Bay area with a total population of nearly 80,000 people. This comprises nearly 60% of the population of Humboldt County. The bay is home to more than 100 plant species, 300 invertebrate species, 100 fish species, and 200 bird species. In addition, the bay and its complex system of marshes and grasses support hundreds of thousands of migrating and local shore birds. Commercially, this second-largest estuary in California is the site of the largest oyster production operations on the West Coast, producing more than half of all oysters farmed in California.

The Port of Humboldt Bay (also referred to as the Port of Eureka) is a deep water port with harbor facilities, including large industrial docks at Fairhaven, Samoa, and Fields Landing designed to serve cargo and other vessels. Several marinas also located in Greater Eureka have the capacity to serve hundreds of small to mid-size boats and pleasure craft. Beginning in the 1850s, the bay was used extensively to export logs and forest products as part of the historic West coast lumber trade, but with the decline of the industry lumber now is only infrequently shipped from the port.

== Geography ==
Humboldt Bay is the only deep-water bay between the San Francisco Bay and Coos Bay, Oregon. The Port of Humboldt Bay is the only port in the region that is dredged regularly to accommodate large ocean-going vessels. Despite being the only protected harbor along nearly 500 miles (800 km) of coastline, the bay's location was undiscovered for centuries after the first arrival of European explorers. This is partially because the bay is difficult to see from the ocean. The harbor opens to the sea through a narrow and historically treacherous passage, which was blocked from direct view because of sandbars. Formation of such sandbars is now managed by a system of jetties. Contributing to the bay's isolation were features of the coastal mountain range, which extends from the ocean approximately 150 miles (240 km) inland, and the common marine layer (fog) in addition to frequent clouds or rain.

The bay is approximately 14 miles (23 km) long but can be from 0.5 miles (0.80 km) wide at the entrance to the widest point at 4.3 miles (6.9 km) in the North Bay. The surface area of Humboldt Bay is 16,000 acres (65 km^{2}) of which 6,000 acres (24 km^{2}) are intertidal mudflats. More than 5,000 acres (20 km^{2}) are primarily eelgrass habitat, which has been relatively constant since 1871, although more than 80% of the bay's coastal marsh habitats have been lost or fragmented by levee, railroad and highway construction. At high tide the surface area is approximately 24 square miles (62 km^{2}), but it is 10.8 square miles (28 km^{2}) at low tide. Each tidal cycle replaces 41% of the water in Humboldt Bay, although exchange in small channels and sloughs of the bay can take up to three weeks.

=== Geomorphology ===
Humboldt Bay began to form when a river valley drowned about 10,000 to 15,000 years ago during a period of rapid sea level rise. Bay sediments also contain buried salt marsh deposits showing that areas of the bay have subsided during episodic large-magnitude subduction earthquakes.

Three rivers, the Mad, Elk, and Eel, drained into Humboldt Bay during the mid-Pleistocene. Subsequently, the Mad River cut a new outlet to the sea, and the flow of the Eel was diverted by tectonic uplift of Table Bluff at the southern end of the bay, but Elk River continues to drain into Humboldt Bay.

In the 21st century, the bay is considered to have three regions:

- the North Bay to the north of Samoa Bridge
- the Entrance Bay from Samoa Bridge to South Jetty
- the South Bay, which is the remainder of the bay to the south

Daby, Woodley, and Tuluwat (formerly Indian) islands are in the North Bay, and all three are within the City of Eureka. Low tides reveal two more islands: Sand Island, which was formed from dredge spoils left in the early 20th century, and Bird Island. A large eelgrass bed in the South Bay, which may be exposed at low tides, is locally known as Clam Island.

== History ==
=== Indigenous people ===
The Wiyot people were the first to inhabit the Humboldt Bay region, including the Mad River and Eel River. It is estimated that the Wiyot arrived at Humboldt Bay circa 900 A.D.

The Wiyot language is related to the Algonquian language of the Great Plains. The Wiyot Tribe is located in Loleta, California. Tribal members reside on two different reservations, the Table Bluff reservation and the old Table Bluff reservation, sometimes referred to as Indianola. The old reservation, roughly 20 acres, was originally purchased by a local church group to relocate homeless Wiyot in the early 1900s. While the old reservation is still in use, the tribe moved to the new Table Bluff reservation. The new reservation is roughly 88 acres.

Wiyot territory is divided into three different regions: lower Mad River, Humboldt Bay, and lower Eel River. Their entire territory was only around 36 miles long and roughly 15 miles wide. Although relatively small, Wiyot territory encompassed miles of old growth redwood forests, sandy dunes, wetlands and open prairies. Due to its abundance, redwood trees were often used by the Wiyot. Most notably, they made canoes and small houses out of the durable redwood. The average redwood canoe would measure a minimum of 18 feet long and 4 feet wide. To make the canoes, the Wiyot would fell a tree and hollow out the log with fire. Their houses would be made out of redwood planks, forming a rectangular shape. A pitched roof would be built on top. It is estimated that there were around 98 Wiyot villages built along Humboldt Bay and the nearby river banks

The Wiyot diet consisted mainly of acorns, berries, shellfish, salmon, deer, elk, and other small game.

The Wiyot name for Humboldt Bay is Wigi. Later encounters between settlers and the Wiyot people turned violent, as the settlers encroached on traditional territories. A small group of settlers perpetrated what is known as the 1860 Wiyot Massacre. Every year, around the month of February, the Wiyot people would gather for their World Renewal Ceremony on Indian Island, which lasted 7 to 10 days. During this ceremony, the men would leave each night to replenish supplies, leaving women, children, and elders on the island to rest. In the early morning hours of February 26, 1860, local settlers from the nearby town of Eureka descended onto Indian Island armed with firearms, clubs, knives, and hatchets. For over an hour, the group of settlers killed and mutilated every single Wiyot they could find. The majority of those murdered were women, children, and elders. The remaining survivors, including those on and off the island, were rounded up and then imprisoned at Fort Humboldt.

Through grassroots fundraising, and with the help of the community and individual donors, the Wiyot Tribe was able to purchase back 1.5 acres of the historic village site of Tuluwat on Indian Island in 2000, and in 2004, the Eureka City Council made history as they unanimously approved a resolution to return approximately 45 acres, comprising the northeastern tip of Indian Island, to the Wiyot Tribe.

=== Discovery and settlement ===
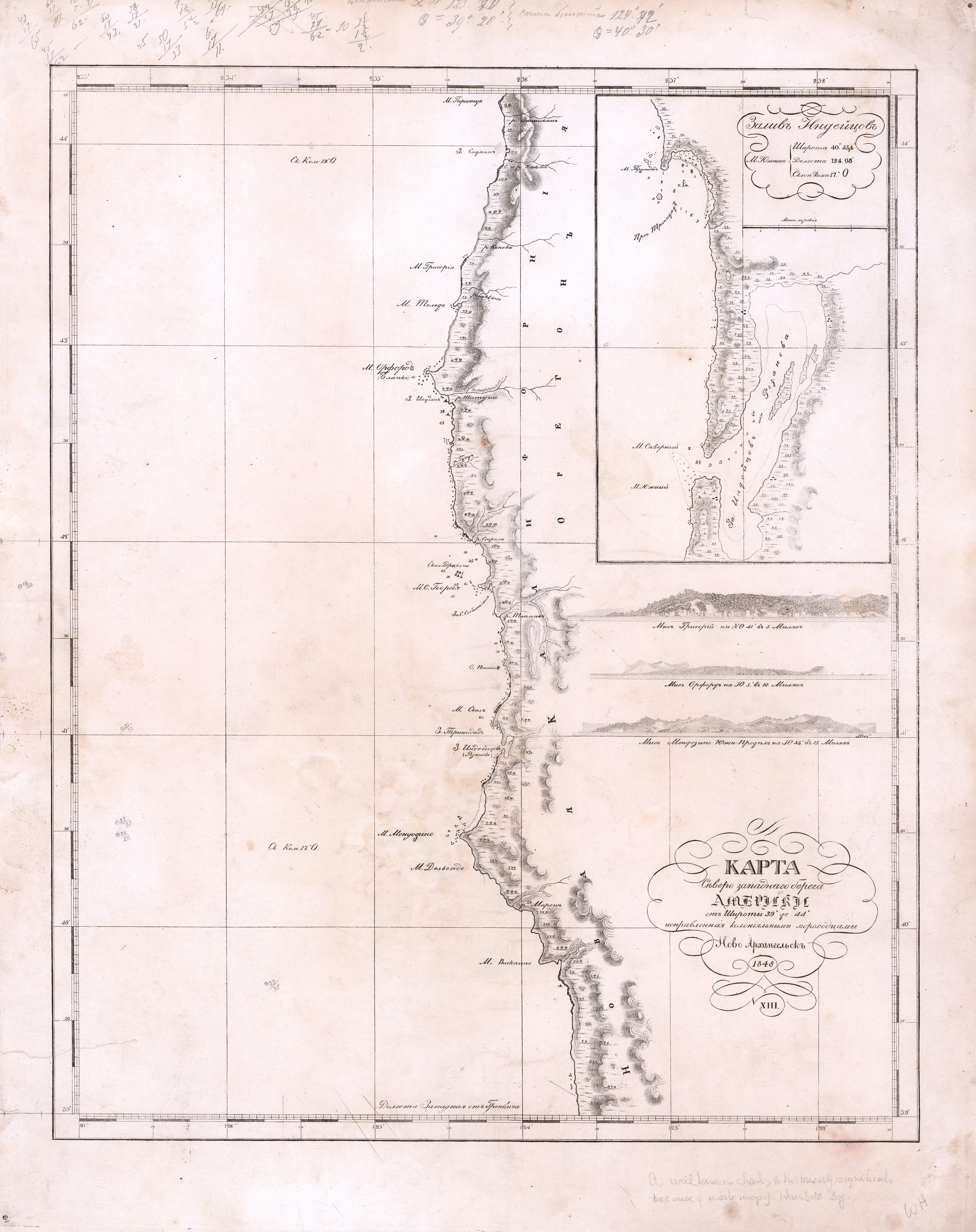
1848 Russian Hydrographic Dept., Coast of America, latitude 39° to 44° with inset showing Bay of Rezanov

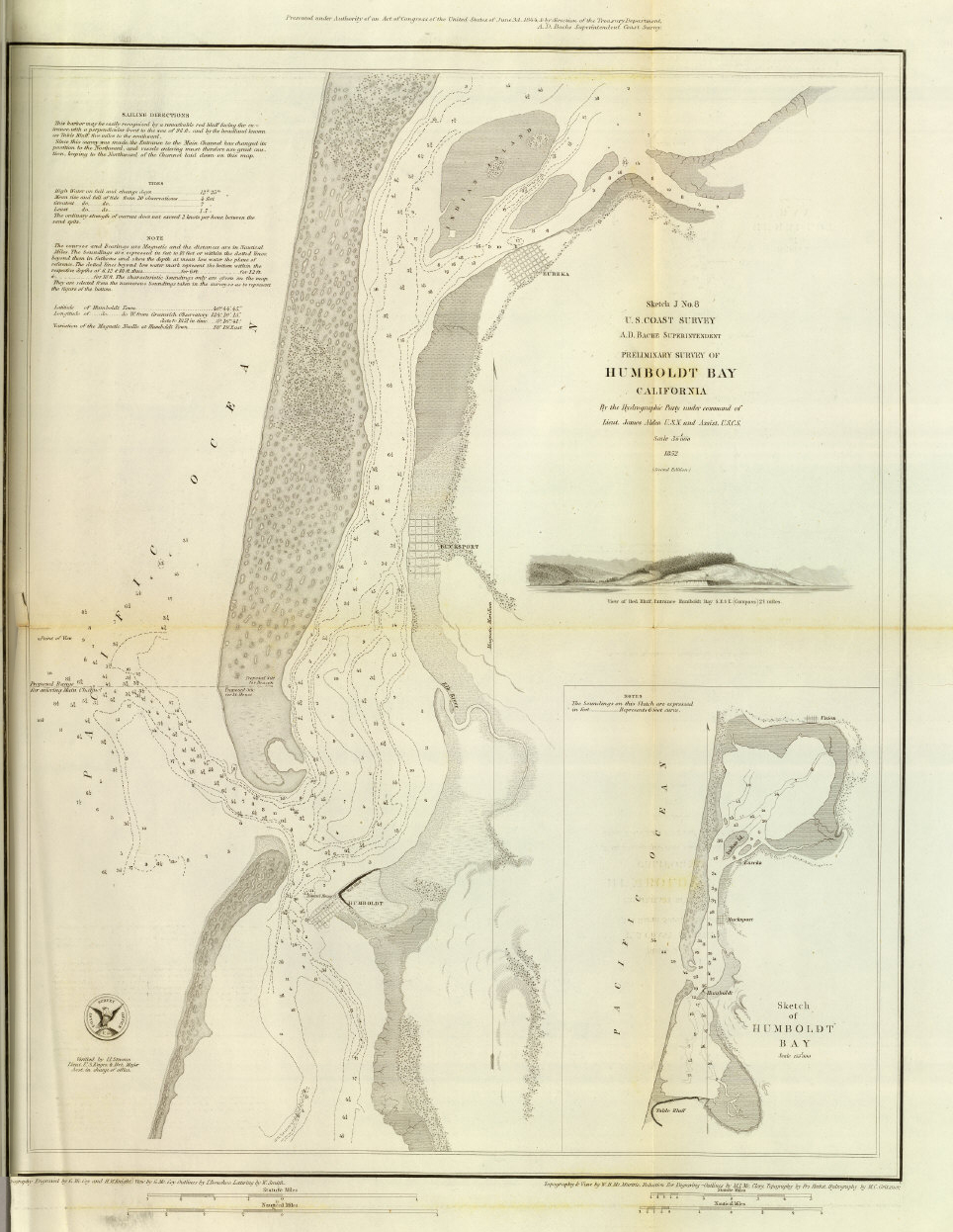
1852 U.S. Coast Survey chart of Humboldt Bay

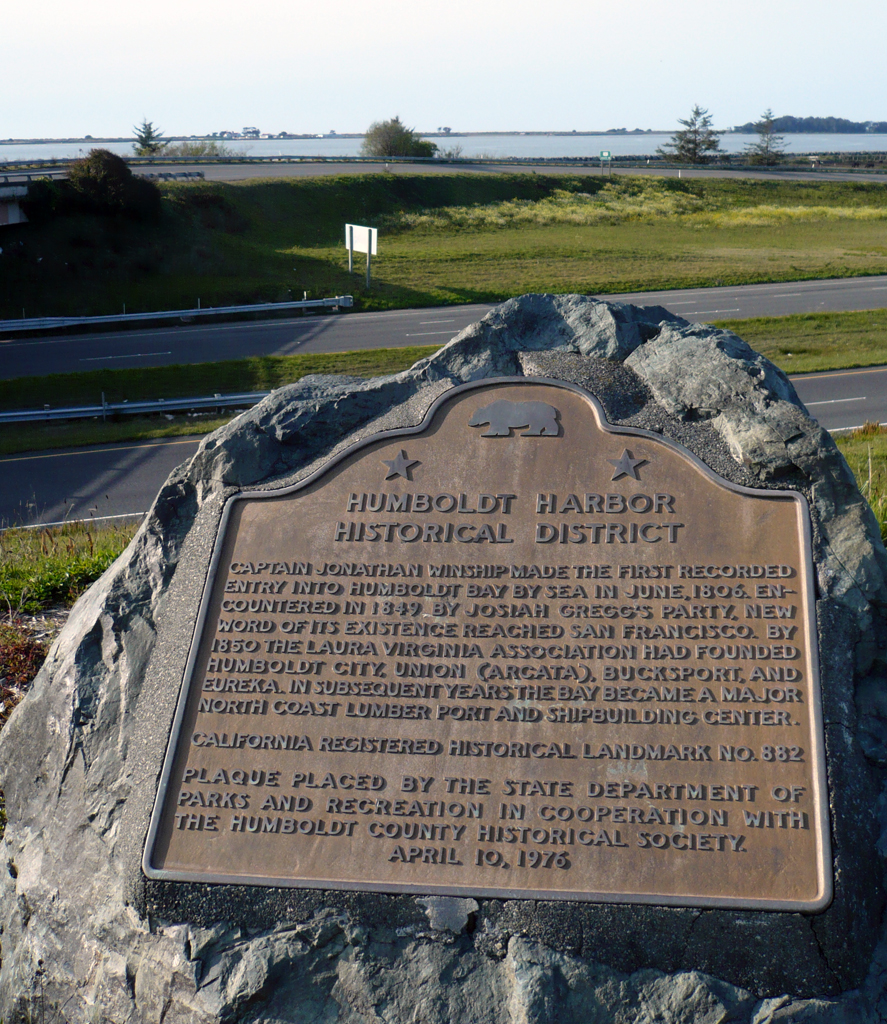
Landmark at the Humboldt Harbor Historical District recalls the exploits of Winship, Gregg, and the Laura Virginia Association

In the early 1800s Americans were drawn to Russian-Alaska by the maritime fur trade. They were searching for the fur of the sea-otter which could be sold for an enormous profit. The trade had been so intense that the number of Alaskan otters had greatly diminished. Captain Jonathan Winship of the Boston ship O'Cain contracted with Alexander Baranov, governor of the Russian-American Company, to hunt for otters along the coast of California. In preparation for the voyage the crew took on provisions for nearly 100 Aleut hunters, 12 native women, and three Russian supervisors. Also stowed aboard were 70 baidarkas, termed "canoes" in Winship's journal. From New Archangel, presently Sitka, the ship sailed south and closed with the coast at Cape Foulweather in Oregon. Several canoes were sent in. For the next week the ship followed the coast while canoes explored inshore. On June 10, 1806, canoes returned to the ship reporting plenty of otters. The scouts had gone ashore and after walking inland, Winship wrote, "they discovered a very spacious Sound." Five canoes went to find the entrance. They returned unsuccessful. O'Cain anchored in nearby Trinidad Bay. The Russians and hunters went ashore to trade for otter skins. Further exploration by small boat located the entrance and revealed the bifurcated nature of the Sound. On June 15 the chief mate and the Russian commander set out with fifty canoes for a "grand inspection." The natives reacted by threatening those who camped overnight. As the number of hostile natives increased, the hunters retreated to the ship. All of the canoes were taken aboard, and on June 21 O'Cain left Trinidad Bay and resumed its voyage to the south. Russians named the discovery the Bay of Rezanov after Nikolai Rezanov, a founder of the Russian-American Company.

Nothing came of the Winship discovery. Decades later, California experienced the Gold Rush. Exploring from his ranch in the Sacramento Valley, Pierson B. Reading found gold on the Trinity River. News of the event drew a wave of prospectors to northern California. With winter approaching, it was apparent that their provisions would be inadequate. A group of eight men led by Josiah Gregg set off in early November to find a route to the ocean. They crossed a succession of mountains. Progress was slow and they ran out of supplies making it necessary to stop and hunt. In places, game was scarce, and they spent days without food. Having crossed the mountains, they arrived at the redwood forest where they found a great mass of fallen timber. Two axemen had to precede the others to cut a way through. Eventually they reached the coast at the mouth of a stream now known as Little River. They headed north until they found their way blocked at Big Lagoon. They returned to what is now Trinidad where they camped. Continuing south, they crossed and named the Mad River. At their next camp, a search for drinking water led to the rediscovery of what is now called Humboldt Bay, December 20, 1849.

At San Francisco there was great interest in finding a sea route to the northern mines. During the first three months of 1850 many vessels sailed to explore the coast. The schooner Laura Virginia, captained by Douglass Ottinger, was chartered by an association. It put to sea with fifty passengers and a cargo of general merchandise. Sailing north well in shore, they observed what appeared to be a large bay, but had to put a landing party ashore at Trinidad to find the bay's entrance. Once the opening was located, Ottinger sent in a boat piloted by second mate Hans Henry Buhne. They managed to cross the bar, enter the bay, and land on the point across from the entrance. Later they headed back out to sea, Buhne sounding the channel. Aboard the schooner they decided to send in two boats loaded with passengers, tents and supplies. They landed on the north spit, then the following morning moved to the point. Days later, Buhne met the schooner at sea, and on April 14, 1850, he piloted the Laura Virginia into the bay and anchored off the point. The members of the Laura Virginia Association named the bay and their settlement in honor of Alexander von Humboldt, a noted German naturalist.

Humboldt Bay was surveyed in 1851 by the United States Coast Survey and the first detailed chart was issued.

After two years of white settlement on Humboldt Bay, in 1852 only six ships sailed from the bay to San Francisco. But by 1853, on the same route, 143 ships loaded with lumber for markets crossed the bar. Of those, despite the best efforts of local pilots and tugs, 12 ships wrecked on the bar. In times of bad weather, ships could be forced to remain in harbor for weeks before attempting the crossing. The first marker at the harbor entrance was placed in 1853.

The U.S. Federal Government authorized funds for a lighthouse near the mouth to improve navigation. In 1856 the Humboldt Harbor Light was built on the north spit. In 1872 a bell boat was added, and two years later, a steam whistle replaced the bell to assist mariners during times of dense fog. Eighty-one people drowned between 1853 and 1880 during bar crossings, including the captain of the brig Crimea, who was washed overboard while crossing the bar on February 18,1870. The Humboldt Bay Life-Saving Station is on the bay side of the North Spit, south of the World War II era blimp base.

By the 1880s, long wharves were built into the bay for easier loading of lumber shipments. Shipbuilding became part of local industry. The Bendixson shipyards produced 120 ships on Humboldt Bay. The volume of shipping reached about 600 vessels a year by 1881. Humboldt Bay was made an official United States port of entry in 1882, a status that permitted shipping from there directly to overseas ports. In 1886, fierce storms nearly destroyed the Harbor Light, and it was replaced by the Table Bluff Light.

In 1968, land ownership along the Bay became the focal point of a legal battle, when a lawsuit was filed against the City of Eureka to determine legal ownership of land along the Eureka waterfront. The litigation spanned 13 years and involved extensive historical research, including evidence of original deeds and lawsuits dating back to before the establishment of the city. This became known as the Eureka Tidelands Case, or Lazio v. City of Eureka. These documents, along with copies of many historical maps as well as a series of contemporary aerial photographs and archaeological findings commissioned for the case, are included in Cal Poly Humboldt's Eureka Waterfront Litigation Collection.

== Engineering ==
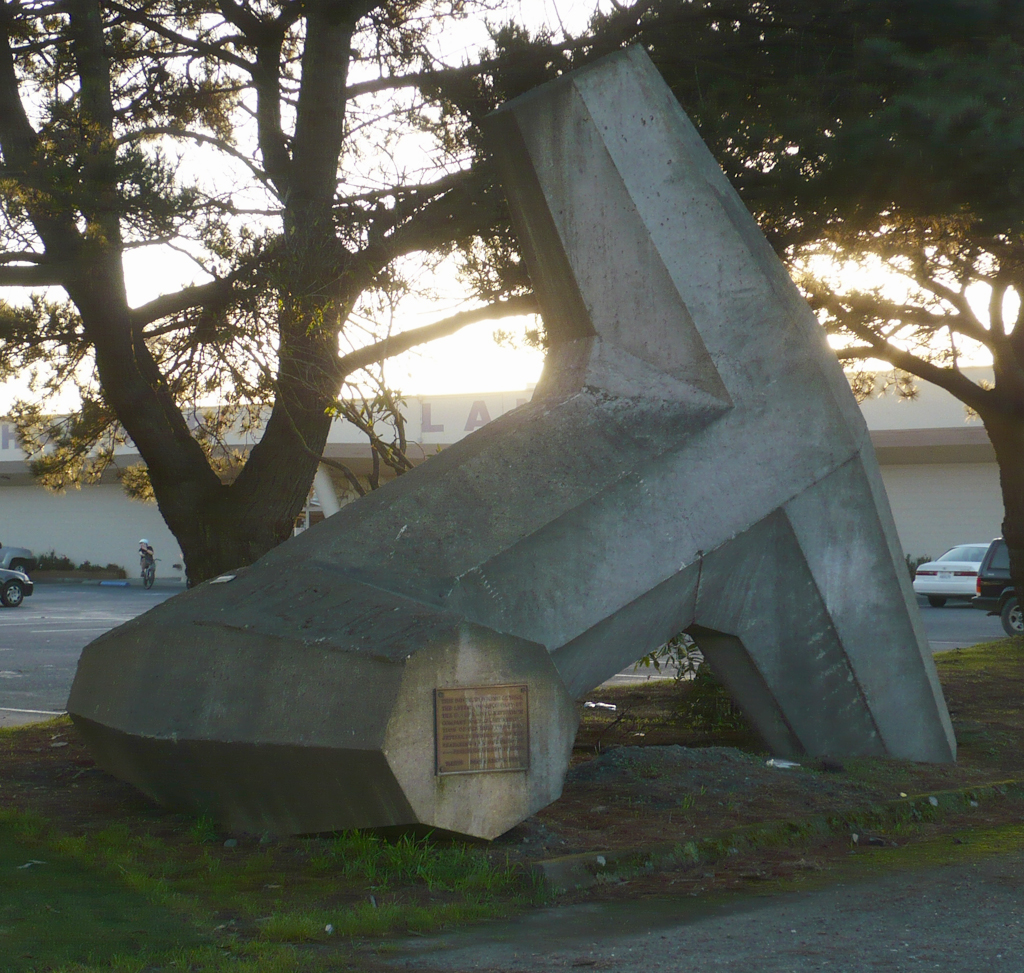
One of the 4,796 dolosse made on the South Spit for use on the south and north jetties protecting the mouth of Humboldt Bay. One dolos was on display in front of the Eureka Chamber of Commerce, which moved in 2022.

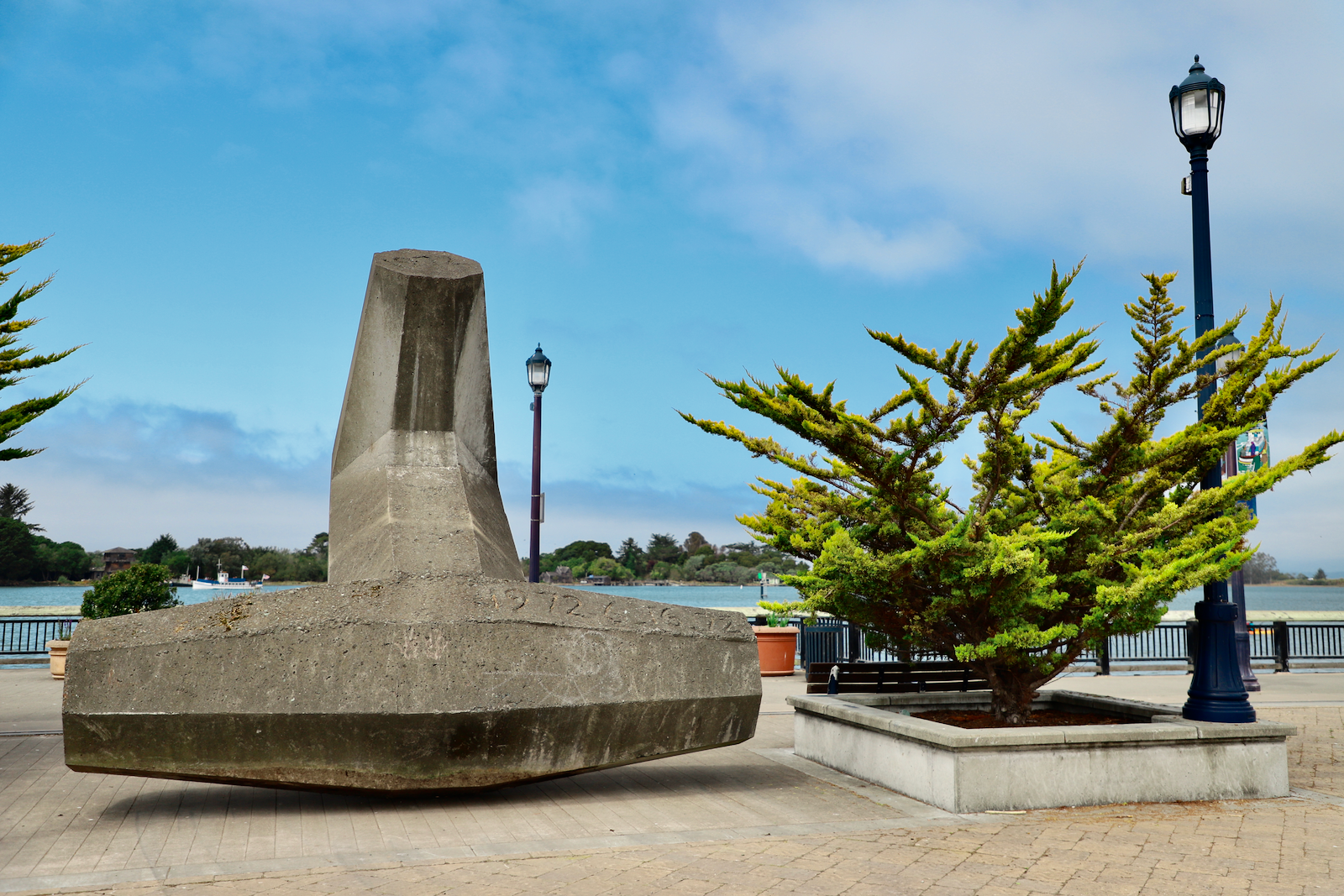
The donated dolos after it was moved to Madaket Plaza in 2022

The unimproved state of the mouth of the bay was a crescent-shaped bar covered by a line of breaking waves. The entrance of the bay is protected by two sand spits, named South Spit and North Spit. The bay mouth was stabilized by jetties, with one jetty projecting from each spit. The South Spit jetty was built starting in 1889, but by 1890 observers realized that it had produced erosion of the North Spit and was widening the channel. The jetties are approximately 6,000 feet (1,800 m) long and 2,200 feet (670 m) apart. Recurring storm damage required rebuilding the jetties in 1911, 1927, 1932, 1939, 1950, 1957, 1963, 1971, 1988 and 1995. Entrance currents are strong, ranging from 2.0 knots average maximum ebb and 1.6 knots average maximum flood; but peak rates can be nearly twice as high.

In 1971 and 1984, 42 short tons (38 t) dolosse were added in two layers to secure the jetties, which are maintained by the U.S. Army Corps of Engineers. In 1972, 4,796 dolosse were manufactured locally; 4,795 of them are on the jetties, and one was installed outside the Eureka Chamber of Commerce. The donated dolos was slated for demolition due to sale of this property by the City of Eureka in 2022, but it was relocated to Madaket Plaza through a community effort. In 1983, 1,000 more dolosse were made at the South Spit yard and left to cure; local newspapers named the curing site "Humboldt's Stonehenge." In 1985, 450 of the dolosse were shipped 35 miles (56 km) around the bay to be placed on the North Spit. At that point, more than $20,000,000 had been spent in total to protect the entrance to Humboldt Bay.

In 1977 the jetties were named an American Society of Civil Engineers California historical civil engineering landmark. They were designated in 1981 as a national historical civil engineering landmark. The jetties are inspected annually by the U.S. Army Corps of Engineers. In 1996, the inspection showed that 34 of the dolosse had cracked, 17 on each jetty, mostly near the southern seaward head.

Dredging of channels for shipping began in 1881; periodic dredging of the entrance and shipping channels maintains a depth of 38 to 48 feet (12 to 15 m). These cumulative changes and water action have resulted in severe erosion at the bay's entrance, where approximately 188 acres (0.76 km^{2}) of Buhne Point, which had formerly visually blocked the entrance to the bay, washed away between 1854 and 1955.

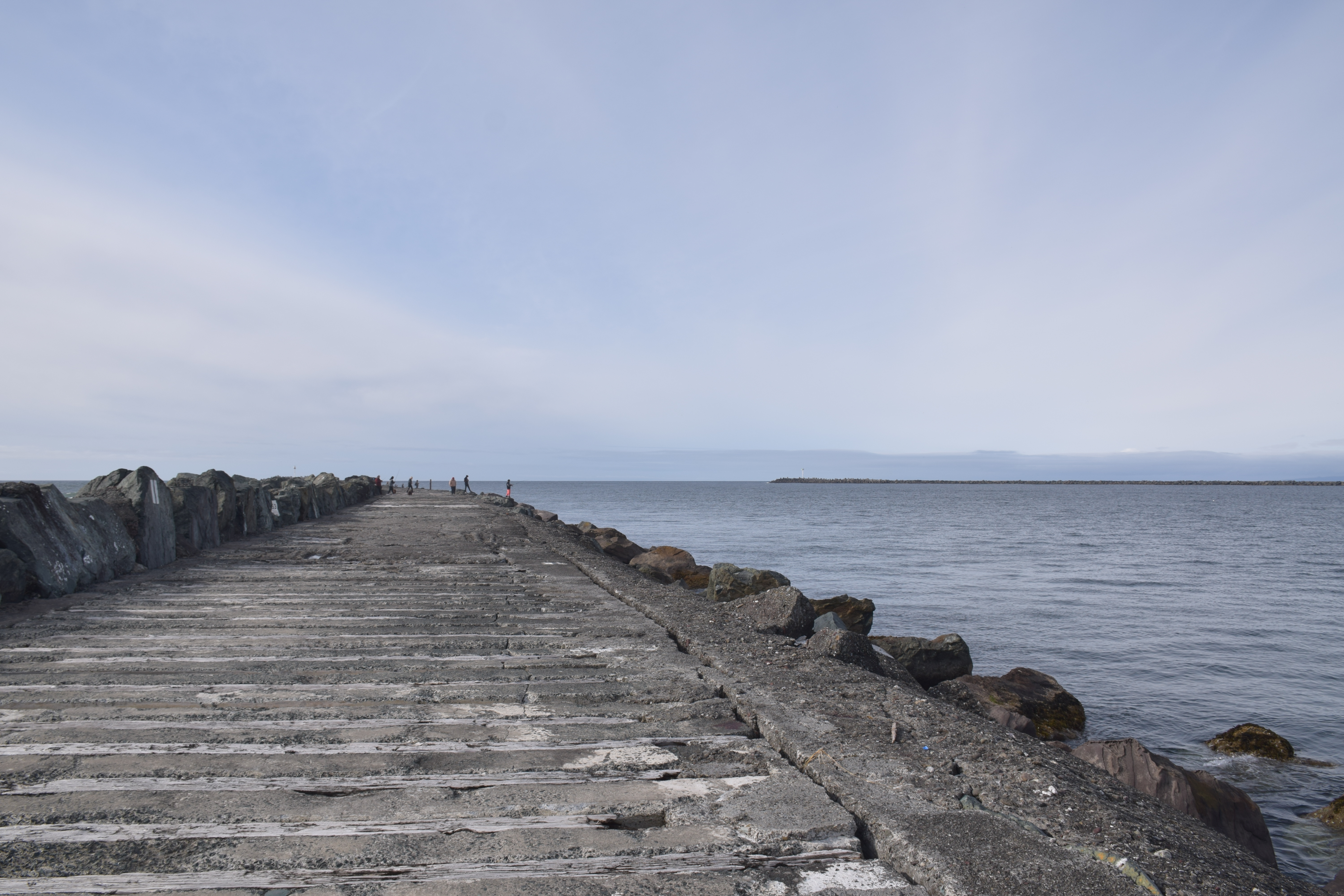
Table Bluff Beach offers views of the South Spit Jetty. Fishermen are often seen fishing.

Most of the large sloughs around the bay have been protected with levees. But because of development by residents and businesses, of the 10,000 acres (40 km^{2}) of historic intertidal marsh, only about 10% remains. Other marsh areas were lost to land reclamation for hay or pasture, and construction of the Northwestern Pacific Railroad in 1901. This reduced tidal connectivity along the eastern edge of the bay, which resulted in deterioration of large areas of marsh habitat.

== Ecology ==
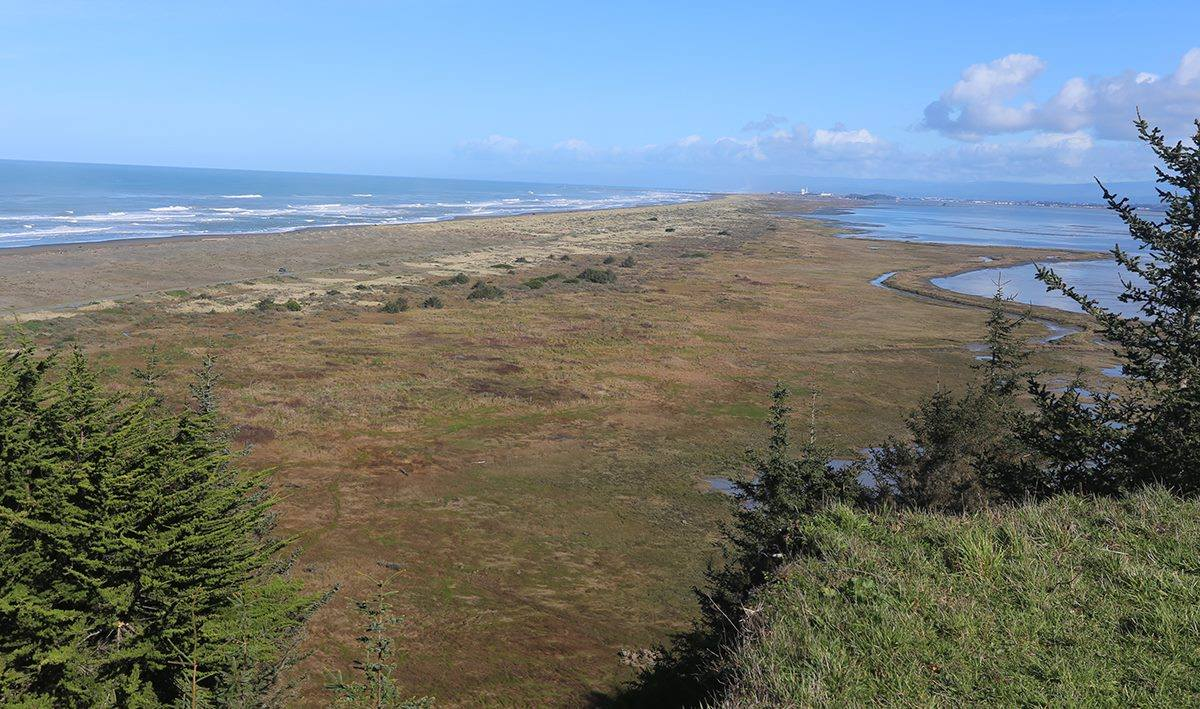
The Mike Thompson Wildlife Area is a 4.5-mile-long (7.2 km) stretch of beach, dunes and tidal marsh that serves as a popular destination for waterfowl hunting, surf fishing, and clamming on the south spit of Humboldt Bay.

Humboldt Bay and its tidal sloughs are open to fishing year-round. A protected area in the bay is the Humboldt Bay National Wildlife Refuge, created in 1971 for the protection and management of wetlands and bay habitats for migratory birds. The Humboldt Botanical Garden, at the College of the Redwoods near the Bay, preserves and displays local native plants. Humboldt Bay is also recognized for protection by the California Bays and Estuaries Policy.

In the winter, the bay serves as a feeding and resting site for more than 100,000 birds. Among these are gull species, Caspian tern, brown pelican, cormorant, surf scoter, and common murre.

The bay is a source of subsistence for a variety of salt-water fish, crustaceans, and mollusks. Sport fishing is permitted. Dungeness crab are fished privately and commercially, and oysters are commercially farmed in the bay. The bay supports more than 100 species of marine and estuarine fish, including green sturgeon, coho and Chinook salmon, steelhead and coastal cutthroat trout, which spawn and rear in its watershed, covering an area of 223 square miles (580 km^{2}). Coho salmon primarily rear and spawn in Elk River, Freshwater Creek, and Jacoby Creek. A recent study found that 40% of coho in the system rear in the estuary. The federally endangered tidewater goby is found in the bay, along with more common three-spined stickleback, shiner perch and Pacific staghorn sculpin.

The bay has been invaded by the European green crab, a voracious predator that is known to prey on the young of native crab species, as well as native mussels, oysters, and clams. European green crab were first documented in Humboldt Bay in 1995 and have been blamed for a decline in clam harvesting. Scientists have not found a way to control them.

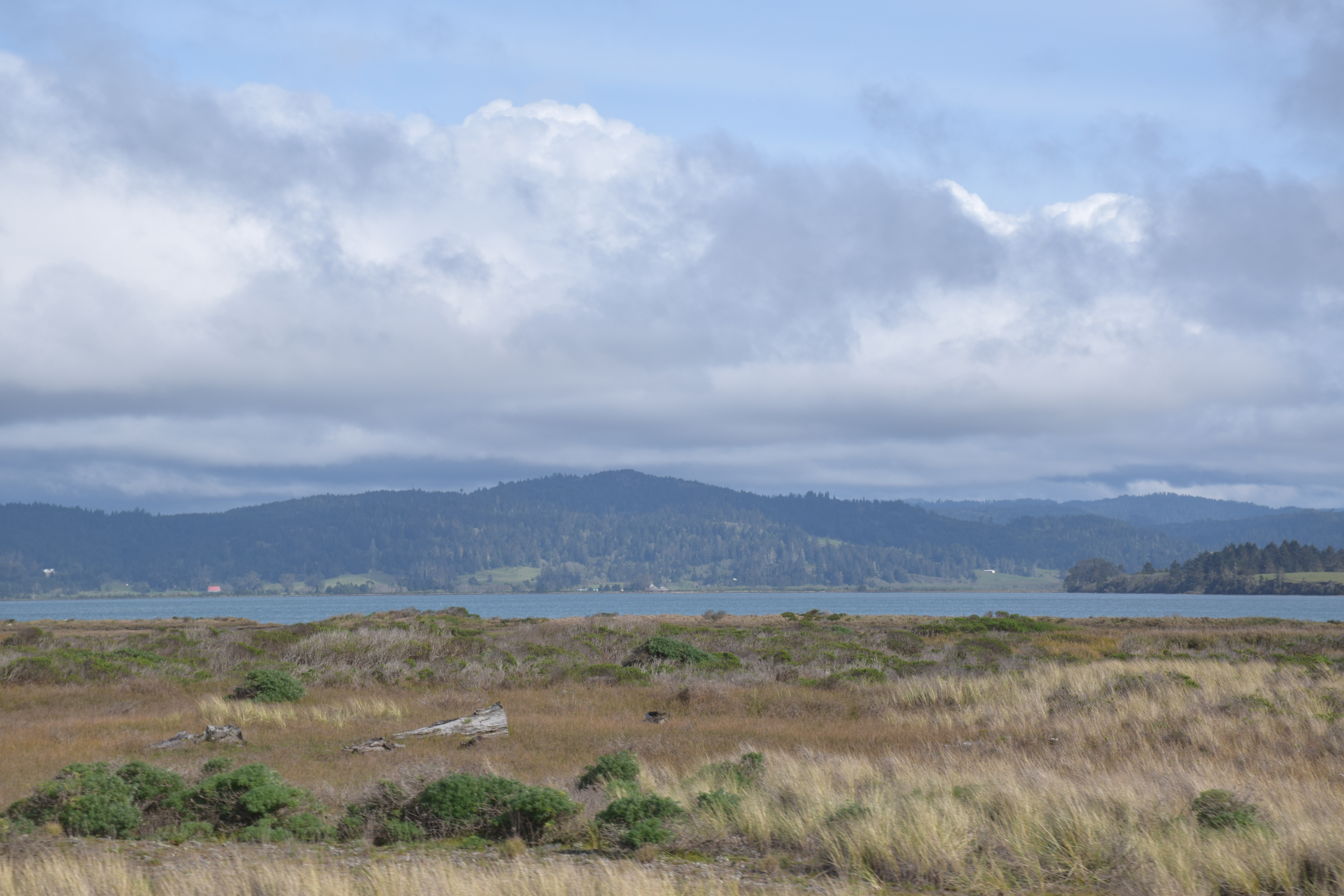
A close up view of the Mike Thompson Wildlife Area located on Table Bluff Beach in Loleta, California

Marine mammals are represented by harbor porpoises, harbor seal, California sea lion and river otter, with Steller sea lion and gray whale found immediately offshore. Leopard sharks have been reported inside the bay, which also provides habitat for young bat rays, feeding on clams, crabs, shrimps, worms, sea cucumbers, brittle stars, various gastropods and isopods.

== Bay settlements ==
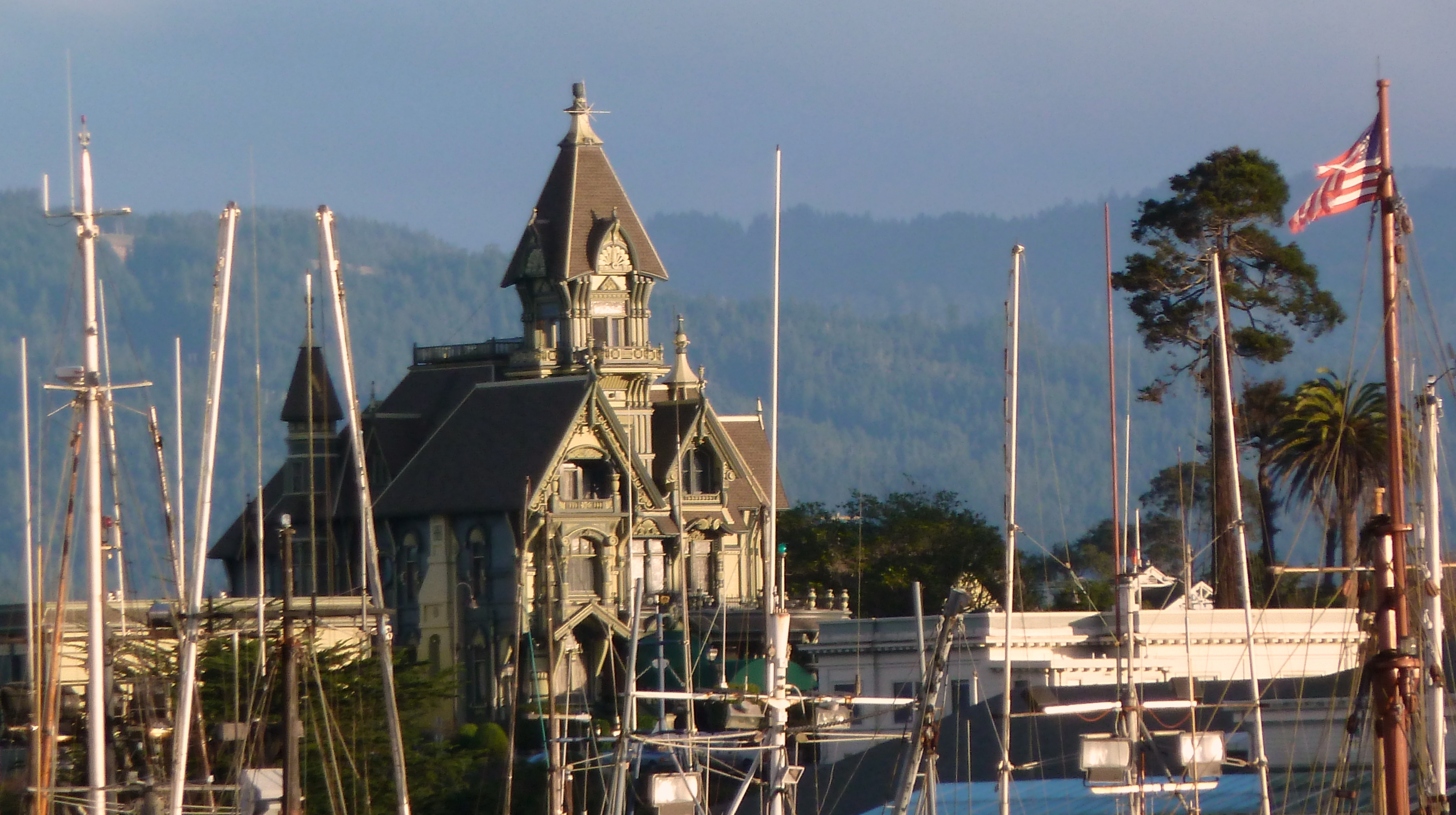
Easterly view from the docks of Eureka's Woodley Island Marina. Carson Mansion at dusk, with distant view of California Coast Ranges due east of the populated Humboldt Bay area.

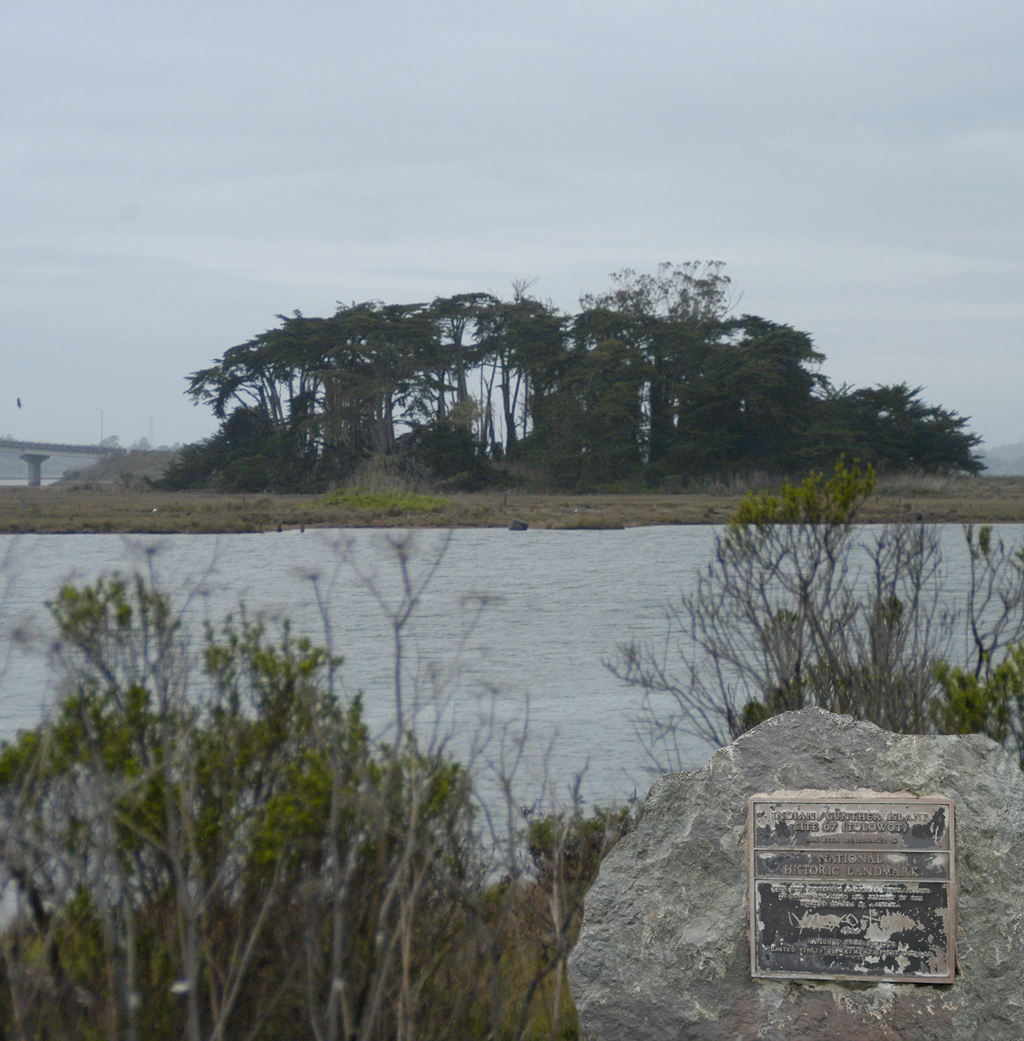
Northerly view from Woodley Island of Monterey cypress trees on Tuluwat Island, the largest of three islands, all of which are in the Eureka City limits. The great egret nests in these trees in large numbers each year.

About 80,000 people reside on the shore of the bay in at least 20 named settlements on the coastal plain around the bay estuary. Most of these are unincorporated suburbs of the City of Eureka.

Settlements located on or near the bay, listed clockwise from the north side of the bay entrance:

- Fairhaven
- Samoa
- Manila
- Arcata
  - Sunny Brae
  - Bayside (includes Hidden Valley, which is surrounded by Indianola)
- Eureka
  - Indianola
  - Freshwater
  - Myrtletown
  - Cutten
  - Ridgewood
  - Pine Hill
  - Bayview
  - Elk River
  - Humboldt Hill
  - King Salmon
- Fields Landing
- Hookton
- Loleta
- Table Bluff

== Bay tributaries and sloughs ==
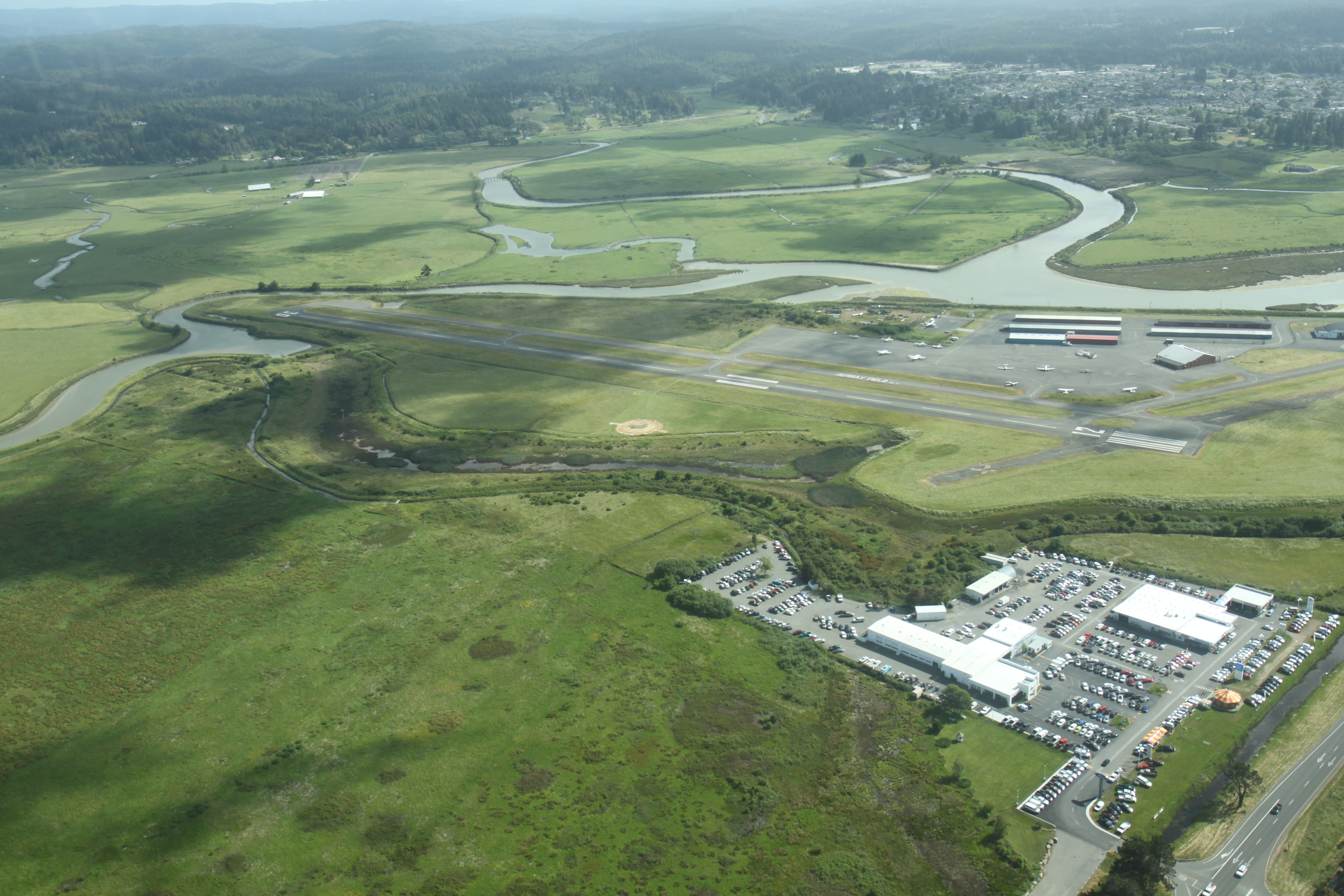
Southerly view of Eureka Slough (left and midsection, larger stream), Freshwater Slough (right-mid portion, larger stream); and when photo is expanded Freshwater Creek (background and left near treeline), Ryan Slough (mid-upper top portion), Ryan Creek (furthest top midsection and barely visible when photo is expanded). Location is South of Highway 101 at the northern edge of the city of Eureka.

Streams and sloughs that enter into Humboldt Bay are listed north to south, clockwise, with tributaries entering nearest the bay listed first. The primary streams of major watershed areas east of the bay (draining a combined area of 288 square miles (746 km^{2})) are in bold.

- Mad River Slough
  - Liscom Slough
- Janes Creek (enters the bay as McDaniels Slough)
- Jolly Giant Creek (enters the bay as Butcher Slough)
- Campbell Creek (partially channeled to Gannon Slough)
- Fickle Hill Creek
- Gannon Slough
  - Grotzman Creek
  - Beith Creek
- Little Jacoby Creek
- **Jacoby Creek**
- Washington Gulch Creek
- Rocky Gulch Creek
- Eureka Slough
  - Fay Slough
    - Cochran Creek
  - **Freshwater Creek**
    - Little Freshwater Creek
  - Ryan Slough
    - Ryan Creek
  - First Slough
  - Second Slough
  - Third Slough
- Clarke Slough
- **Elk River**
  - Swain Slough
    - Martin Slough
- Willow Brook/White Slough
- **Salmon Creek**
  - Deering Creek
  - Little Salmon Creek
- Hookton Slough

== Harbor management ==
Humboldt Bay Harbor Recreation and Conservation District is the governing body of Humboldt Bay, the Port of Humboldt Bay, and the Port of Eureka. Despite the jetties and dredging, the harbor entrance remains challenging. Only maritime pilots trained and employed by the district are authorized to bring vessels beyond a certain size into the bay, unless a ship's pilot has proper certification. The Humboldt Bay District maintains a 237-berth marina at Woodley Island, serving both recreational and commercial boats and a shipping dock located in South Bay.

Dangerous sand bars and shifting currents have caused many shipwrecks at the entrance to Humboldt Bay, particularly during the late nineteenth century. Forty-two ships were wrecked in and around the channel, most of them while under tow by a piloted tug boat. Fifty-four ships were wrecked on the Humboldt County coastline. Most shipwrecks occurred between 1850 and 1899.

== Humboldt Bay National Wildlife Refuge ==
The Humboldt Bay National Wildlife Refuge was established in 1971 to conserve and protect a diverse habitat full of mammals, migratory birds, fish, amphibians, and plants. In total, Humboldt Bay National Wildlife Refuge is 3,000 acres including the cities and towns of Loleta, Eureka, and Arcata

== Restoration projects ==
=== Salmon Creek ===
Humboldt Bay has many different tributaries, such as a river or stream, flowing into larger rivers or lakes For Humboldt Bay, Salmon Creek is the third largest tributary. Just like the name suggests, Salmon Creek has historically supported large populations of coho salmon, steelhead trout, and chinook salmon. In recent years, the coho salmon population has seen a steady decline in California. Factors such as freshwater habitat degradation, timber harvest activities, and diversion of water for agricultural and municipal purposes influenced coho salmon populations. Historically, Salmon creek consisted of tidal salt marshes with many sloughs mixed in. Due to over grazing, levee construction, and installation of tide gates in the 1900s, Salmon Creek was severely degraded. Humboldt Bay NWR acquired the land in 1988 and deemed Salmon Creek in need of restoration to improve estuarine habitats. Phase 1 of restoration began in 2006 and aimed to increase tidal connectivity, construct new tide gates, and to reconnect several off channel ponds to the stream. Phase 1 improved habitat and slightly increased fish passage, but more restoration was needed. Phase 2 of restoration began by adding 4,200 feet of new estuarine channel and habitat. The estuarine channels were improved by the alignment of slough channels through the original marshes. Lastly, over 200 logs of various sizes were added to the channels and sloughs as hiding and resting areas for marine life. A year after restoration was completed, California Department of Fish and Game conducted a survey and sampled more juvenile coho salmon than the previous year

=== Lanphere Dunes ===
The Lanphere Dunes restoration project is considered to be the first of its kind on the west coast. Situated on Humboldt Bay National Wildlife Refuge, the Lanphere Dunes are home to many unique plant and animal species. Restoration efforts began in 1980 to halt the spread of invasive European Beachgrass (Ammophilia arenaria). Originally inhabited by the Wiyot people, the Lanphere Dunes were under stewardship by new landowners, William and Hortense Lanphere in the 1930s. Along with European Beachgrass, Yellow Bush Lupine (Lupinus arboreus), another invasive species, was introduced from an adjacent property nearby. Dune restoration can be quite difficult as all of the plants, animals, and organisms have evolved and co adapted to the specialized coastal conditions. Dunes are considered to be a hostile ecosystem because of environmental conditions such as low soil fertility, summer drought, ocean spray, harsh winds, and intense albedo. Due to these conditions, mechanical restoration is best suited for this type of project. Mechanical restoration began by the removal of European Beachgrass by hand or with shovels. Removal of European Beachgrass requires multiple visits over the course of several years due to the plants' tenacious rhizome. This removal technique also allows for the native vegetation to recolonize at the same rate. The first restoration project started over 40 years ago and to date, native plant and animal communities are thriving.

== See also ==
- California State Route 255 – only bay crossing and sole access to the Woodley Island Marina.
- Humboldt Harbor Light
- Table Bluff Light
