= List of killings by law enforcement officers in the United States, June 2013 =

This is a list of people reported killed by non-military law enforcement officers in the United States in June 2013, whether in the line of duty or not, and regardless of reason or method. The listing documents the occurrence of a death, making no implications regarding wrongdoing or justification on the part of the person killed or officer involved. Killings are arranged by date of the incident that caused death. Different death dates, if known, are noted in the description. The table below lists 112 people.

== June 2013 ==
Date	Name (Age) of Deceased	Race	State (City)	Description
2013-06-30	George Harvey (39)	Black	Georgia (Augusta)	
2013-06-30	David Garcia (34)	Hispanic	California (Los Angeles)	
2013-06-29	Martinez-Ramirez, Marcial (62)	Hispanic	Florida (Miami)	
2013-06-29	Paul M. Caruso (46)	Unknown race	New York (Shirley)	
2013-06-29	Lonnie Taylor (21)	Black	California (Vacaville)	
2013-06-29	Merlin Factor (26)	White	California (Yucaipa)	
2013-06-28	Michael Goodman (64)	White	Arkansas (Jacksonville)	
2013-06-28	Shawn Knight (50)	White	Pennsylvania (Uniontown)	
2013-06-28	Ricky Don McCommas (49)	White	Texas (Granbury)	
2013-06-28	Christopher A. Fredette (32)	Asian	Texas (San Antonio)	
2013-06-27	Deangelo Lopez (22)	Black	California (Compton)	
2013-06-27	Mallory, Eugene (80)	White	California (Littlerock)	Mallory was shot and killed during a narcotics-related search warrant. Deputies claim Mallory rose out of bed and pointed a gun at them, but Mallory's wife disputes this.
2013-06-26	Miquell (Mike) David Deppa (34)	White	Minnesota (Liberty Township)	
2013-06-26	William McCullough (30)	White	California (Hemet)	
2013-06-26	Richard Dale Kohler (66)	White	West Virginia (Maysel)	
2013-06-25	Anthony Thompson (34)	White	California (Jurupa Valley)	
2013-06-24	Mark Chernin (43)	White	Florida (Cape Coral)	
2013-06-24	Kenneth John (26)	Native American	Alaska (Fairview)	
2013-06-23	Noah Burford Silva (26)	White	Texas (Houston)	Silva was arrested following an attempted theft at a Home Depot in Pearland, Texas. During the arrest Silva attempted to evade officers on foot. After a short chase Silva was arrested and taken to Memorial Hermann Southeast hospital for injuries he received during the foot chase. While Silva was at the hospital he attempted to leave his room and escape the hospital. A Pearland officer that was guarding Silva's hospital room gave Silva verbal commands to stop, which Silva ignored. Silva and the officer then began a foot chase though the emergency room and out the hospital. When Silva got outside the hospital he jumped into a retention pond and began to swim across. The officer followed Silva into the pond and became to swim after Silva. When Silva made it to an embankment, he turned toward the officer, who was still in the pond. The officer discharged his weapon, fatally striking Silva.
2013-06-23	Jessica Gonzalez (35)	Hispanic	California (Santa Ana)	
2013-06-23	Damon Earl Bacy Byrd (37)	Black	Texas (Fort Worth)	
2013-06-23	Cacedrick White (26)	Black	Mississippi (Lexington)	
2013-06-23	Sarah Harrington (31)	White	Texas (Round Rock)	
2013-06-22	Gregory Allen Price (56)	Unknown race	Oregon (Roseburg)	
2013-06-22	Ceaser Joe Mendoza (24)	Hispanic	California (La Puente)	
2013-06-21	Charles Warren Wickline (46)	White	West Virginia (Coal City)	
2013-06-20	Jourdan Akili Wagner (20)	Black	Arizona (Glendale)	
2013-06-20	Jordan R. Camp (21)	White	Tennessee (Knoxville)	
2013-06-20	Donnell Carter (39)	Black	Wisconsin (Milwaukee)	
2013-06-19	Kenneth Dewayne Cooper	Black	Oklahoma (Oklahoma City)	Cooper was shot and killed after officers responded to a possible disturbance call
2013-06-19	Howard Curtis Martin (62)	White	Montana (St. Regis)	
2013-06-19	Uriel Juarez (44)	Hispanic	Texas (Irving)	
2013-06-19	Matthew Scott Wiese (46)	White	Washington (Lynnwood)	
2013-06-19	Joseph James Hanegan (28)	Unknown race	Louisiana (Shreveport)	
2013-06-18	Patrick O'Meara (28)	White	Washington (Tillicum)	Mr O'Meara was shot to death by Lakewood, WA police after allegedly pulling a gun, ignoring police commands, and making a move the officers found threatening.
2013-06-18	Jaquaz Walker, (17)	Black	North Carolina (Charlotte)	Walker was shot by an undercover officer during a drug sting operation. The officer and an informant were meeting Walker and another teenager at an elementary school for an alleged marijuana deal. Police say Walker shot the informant in the shoulder, prompting the officer to shoot and kill him.
2013-06-18	Thomas Robinson (50)	Black	New York (New York)	
2013-06-18	Robert Bergeson (59)	White	Connecticut (Salem)	
2013-06-17	John Mark Stevens (41)	White	Texas (Nacogdoches)	
2013-06-17	Kevin L. Ellis (45)	White	Missouri (Kansas City)	
2013-06-17	Cedric Howard (34)	Black	Texas (San Antonio)	
2013-06-16	Joe White (48)	Black	Florida (Miami)	
2013-06-16	James D. Jones (60)	Unknown race	Indiana (Montgomery)	
2013-06-16	Eric Dunphy (54)	White	Florida (Orlando)	
2013-06-16	Eliakim Tipan Shabazz (48)	Black	South Carolina (West Columbia)	
2013-06-16	Antwon Johnson (24)	Black	Illinois (Chicago)	
2013-06-16	Sammie Lamont Wallace (37)	Black	Oklahoma (Midwest City)	
2013-06-16	Name Withheld (53)	White	California (Fremont)	
2013-06-16	Michael Westley (15)	Black	Illinois (Chicago)	
2013-06-16	Jonathan Demarco (23)	Hispanic	Texas (Round Rock)	
2013-06-15	Lewis Pollard (61)	White	Colorado (Fruita)	
2013-06-15	Jorge Abraham Zarazua-Rubio (25)	Hispanic	Nebraska (Omaha)	
2013-06-15	Alejandro De Armas Reinoso (38)	Hispanic	Florida (Miami)	
2013-06-15	Recardio Clark (33)	Black	Florida (Gainesville)	
2013-06-14	Wilfredo Justiniano Jr. (41)	White	Massachusetts (Randolph)	
2013-06-14	Quincy Williams (32)	Black	California (Castro Valley)	
2013-06-13	N. Smith (17)	Unknown race	Alabama (Huntsville)	
2013-06-13	William Sage Berger (34)	White	Washington (Spokane)	
2013-06-13	Jeremiah B. Krubert (39)	White	Wisconsin (Elkhorn)	
2013-06-12	Alexander L. Mandarino (26)	White	Idaho (Mullan)	
2013-06-12	Joseph Thomas Brewer Jr. (54)	Unknown race	California (Orange)	
2013-06-11	Darrius J. Lowery-Baptiste (23)	Black	Wisconsin (Beloit)	
2013-06-11	Zachary Premo (26)	White	Minnesota (Duluth)	Police officers shot Zachary Premo following a confrontation that began while officers looked for a driver who had fled the scene of a one-vehicle crash.
2013-06-10	Joseph Paige (33)	Black	Florida (Orlando)	
2013-06-10	Gregory Bayne (35)	White	Pennsylvania (Lancaster)	
2013-06-10	Winard D'Wayne Burke (34)	White	Georgia (Sardis)	
2013-06-09	Mark A. Koves (28)	White	Illinois (Thornton)	
2013-06-09	Curtis Ray Fipps (48)	White	Oklahoma (Paden)	
2013-06-09	Cameron Arrigoni (21)	White	Maine (Hampden)	
2013-06-09	Noel Mendoza (43)	Hispanic	Connecticut (Meriden)	
2013-06-08	Mohammed Naas (57)	Asian	California (Vallejo)	
2013-06-08	Craig Rodgers (40)	Black	Florida (Bradenton)	
2013-06-08	Urbano Moreno Morales (48)	Hispanic	California (Windsor)	Urbano Moreno Morales stabbed and seriously wounded the mother of his adult son with a knife outside a Starbucks store in Windsor's Town Green neighborhood. Morales walked away from the neighborhood, and started stabbing himself before police approached him. An officer first used a stun gun on Morales and he then charged at the officers with the knife and was then shot 18 times by two Windsor police officer. The Sonoma County DA announced on December 29, 2014 that no charges would be filed against the officers.
2013-06-08	Gregory Allen Rosson Jr. (21)	White	Virginia (Afton)	
2013-06-08	Rustin Wilkerson (19)	Black	California (Perris)	
2013-06-08	Garrett Chruma (21)	Asian	Alabama (Wilmer)	
2013-06-08	Micah Anthony Key (24)	Black	Texas (San Angelo)	
2013-06-08	Joseph Harvey Jr. (36)	White	Maryland (Millersville)	
2013-06-08	Renee Witham (24)	White	Arizona (Tucson)	Witham was suicidal and called 911 to report that she was going to kill herself. The police officers attended the scene and found her outside with a man. They reported she took a gun out of a holster, and the police officers told her to drop the weapon. After she refused police officers opened fire, killing her and injuring the man.
2013-06-07	Andrew Lambeth (37)	White	Georgia (Acworth)	Officers were responding to a domestic dispute where they were told shots had been fired. They encountered a man who was allegedly armed and uncooperative with their commands. Officers shot the man, killing him.
2013-06-07	John Samir Zawahri (23)	Asian	California (Santa Monica)	A man was killed in a shootout with officers in the Santa Monica College Library following an alleged killing spree that left five people dead and at least five wounded. Witnesses said the man wore body armor and a helmet and carried several firearms.
2013-06-07	Layne Michael Campbell (40)	White	Nevada (Reno)	Police were responding to a home invasion when at least one responding deputy shot and killed the suspect.
2013-06-07	Richard Haston (39)	Black	Florida (Hobe Sound)	
2013-06-07	John Zawahri (23)	Asian	California (Santa Monica)	
2013-06-07	Seon Rose (34)	Black	Georgia (Jonesboro)	
2013-06-07	Daniel Lee Lucha Jr. (35)	White	California (Yuba City)	
2013-06-06	Blake Compton (27)	White	Texas (Bonham)	
2013-06-06	John Mark Settlemyer (67)	White	North Carolina (Hickory)	
2013-06-05	William Daniel Mayes (37)	White	California (Escondido)	Police received a report of elderly assault and suspected Mayes of abusing his father. They also received information that Mayes was building explosives, so they used undercover officers to lure Mayes to a park-and-ride lot. Mayes attempted to flee and crashed his car. He allegedly got out of the vehicle and pointed a gun at officers who then shot and killed him. Police say they found explosives in his vehicle.
2013-06-05	Lana Morris (46)	Black	New York (St. Albans)	
2013-06-05	Arnett Myers (57)	Unknown race	Maryland (White Marsh)	
2013-06-05	Hugo Raymond "Ray" Barragan (36)	Unknown race	California (Fallbrook)	
2013-06-04	Peeler, Shirley Jean (51)	Unknown	California (Mad River)	A realtor was showing a property to prospective buyers when they encountered Peeler, whose parents had once owned the property, armed with a rifle. Police say Peeler had been ordered off the property when it went on the market. Peeler allegedly fired a shot at the realtor who then called the police. Officers shot and killed Peeler after they say she threatened them and fired a shot.
2013-06-04	Hartman, David (32)	White	Texas (Highland Park)	Hartman was killed by officers after allegedly escaping handcuffs and pointing a pistol at them. Police had tracked him after a woman reported a suspicious man on a motorcycle.
2013-06-04	Presnall, Demetrice D. (22)	Black	Michigan (Flint)	Presnall was shot 10 times in the back by Flint Area Narcotics Group officers William Huey and Anthony Easlick.
2013-06-04	Byron "Big B" Kelley (32)	Unknown race	Tennessee (Memphis)	
2013-06-04	Luiz Urdez (25)	Hispanic	California (San Jacinto)	
2013-06-04	Timothy John Walker (40)	Unknown race	California (Vallejo)	
2013-06-03	Wilkins, Tyler W. (16)	White	Missouri (Kansas City)	Officers shot Wilkins multiple times after he allegedly brandished a handgun at them while they pursued him on foot. Police say Wilkins matched the description of someone wanted in a recent crime.
2013-06-03	Louis James Skelly (60)	White	Colorado (Red Feather Lakes)	
2013-06-03	Stephen Dinnan (35)	White	Hawaii (Waimanalo)	
2013-06-03	Murillo, Pedro (25)	Hispanic	California (Huron)	An officer approached Murillo, who was on a bicycle, for an unknown reason. Murillo fled on the bike and then on foot. The officer shot and killed Murillo after he allegedly pointed a small handgun at the officer.
2013-06-02	Ross Batista (38)	Hispanic	Massachusetts (Dorchester)	
2013-06-02	Hill, Keoshia (28)	Black	Alabama (Selma)	
2013-06-02	Zeferino, Ricardo Diaz	Hispanic	California (Gardena)	Diaz-Zeferino, unarmed man, was killed by three police officers while slowly removing his hat. He was struck eight times. Another man was injured by police gunfire. The city settled a lawsuit with Zeferino's family for $4.7 million.
2013-06-02	Edward Mwaura (33)	Black	Indiana (South Bend)	
2013-06-02	Guy Guthrie (55)	Unknown race	Colorado (Pine)	
2013-06-02	Bill Jackson (59)	Black	Alabama (Selma)	
2013-06-01	Cargnoni, Giacomo (21)	White	California (San Diego)	Police were responding to a report of a man threatening to shoot another man. They pursued the suspect's vehicle and pulled him over. Officers shot and killed the man after he allegedly got out of his vehicle and pointed an object at them. Police say they recovered a gun from inside the vehicle but did not state what object the man was holding.
2013-06-01	Riedisser, Justin Tyler (26)	White	Arizona (Phoenix)	Several officers shot and killed Riedisser after he allegedly pointed a gun at them. Police were initially responding to a domestic violence incident at an apartment. They tracked Riedisser to another location less than a mile away before killing him.
2013-06-01	Jacobs, Roy, Jr. (48)	White	Washington (Spokane)	Jacobs called police to his apartment to turn himself in on a child support warrant. Family members who were with him in the apartment said that when officers arrived, Jacobs got up and stepped forward and was shot. Police recovered a knife from the apartment, although witnesses say Jacobs was not holding it.
2013-06-01	unnamed male (21)	Unknown	Texas (Corsicana)	Police were responding to a report of a suicidal man in a trailer park. Officers shot and killed him after he allegedly fired more than one shot towards them.

== See also ==
- Death in custody § United States
- Henry A. Wallace Police Crime Public Database
- List of cases of police brutality
- List of countries with annual rates and counts for killings by law enforcement officers
- List of law enforcement officers killed in the line of duty in the United States
- List of law enforcement officers convicted for an on-duty killing in the United States
- List of shootings by US immigration agents
- List of police reforms related to the George Floyd protests
- List of unarmed African Americans killed by law enforcement officers in the United States
- Lists of killings by law enforcement officers
- Police brutality in the United States
- Police misconduct § United States
- Police riot § United States
- Police use of deadly force in the United States
