= Elk River, California =

Unincorporated community in California, United States

Elk River
- Unincorporated community
- Location in California Elk River (the United States)
- Coordinates: 40°44′10″N 124°10′27″W
- Country: United States
- State: California
- County: Humboldt
- Elevation: 69 ft (21 m)

Elk River is an unincorporated community in Humboldt County, California, United States. It is located 2.25 miles (3.6 km) east-northeast of Fields Landing, at an elevation of 69 feet (21 m). All the residents of this neighborhood have Eureka, California addresses.

There are two wooden covered bridges in the Elk River area. The community is named for the river draining the portion of Humboldt Bay watershed between Salmon Creek to the south and Freshwater Creek to the north. Elk River originates at 1,500-foot (460 m) elevation in the California Coast Ranges 20 miles (32 km) east of Humboldt Bay, and flows south and west of its namesake community before discharging into Humboldt Bay near Eureka's southern city boundary.
