= Humboldt Harbor Light =

Lighthouse in California, United States

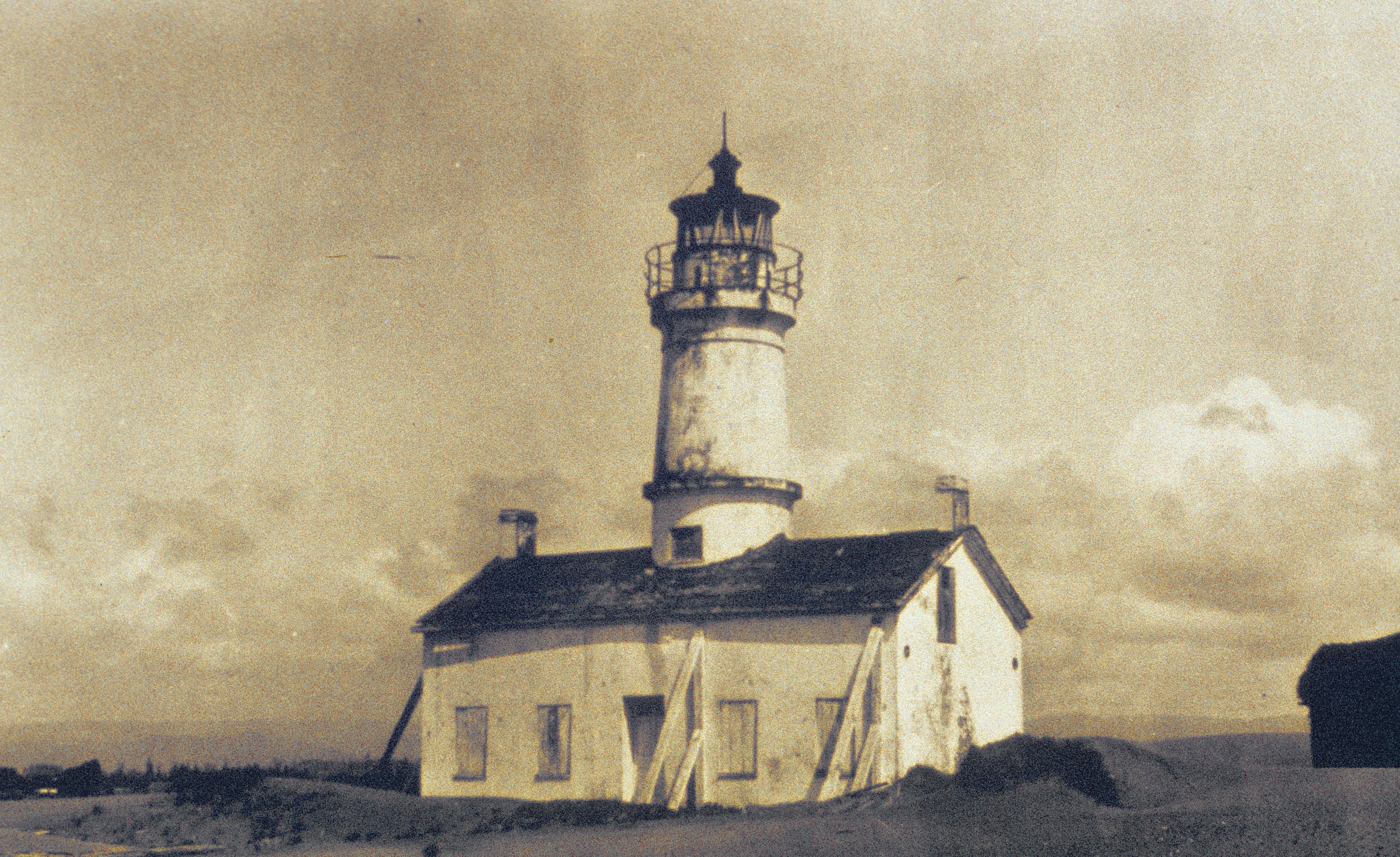
- The Humboldt Harbor Light, when it still stood.
- Location: north side of entrance Humboldt Bay; California; United States
- Coordinates: 40°46′7.1″N 124°13′15.7″W

Tower
- Constructed: 1856
- Foundation: brick basement
- Construction: brick tower
- Height: 45 feet (14 m)
- Shape: cylindrical tower with balcony and lantern
- Markings: white tower, black lantern

Light
- Deactivated: 1892
- Focal height: 14 m (46 ft)
- Lens: Fourth order Fresnel lens
- Range: 13 nautical miles (24 km; 15 mi)
- Characteristic: F W

The Humboldt Harbor Light was an early lighthouse marking the entrance to Humboldt Bay. Plagued by fog, earthquakes, and flooding, it was eventually abandoned and left to deteriorate in favor of a new light at Table Bluff.

== History ==
Humboldt Bay is reached through a narrow gap between two long sand spits, and the founding of Eureka, California in 1850 on the shores of the bay led to the provision of a lighthouse for the bay in the first set of eight west coast lights. The design was essentially that of the original Point Loma Light: a central tower with a 1½ story house erected around it. A fourth order Fresnel lens was provided and the light was first exhibited in December 1856. The protracted construction made this the last of the original eight lights to be completed, and in fact some lights in the next set were lit first.

The light was situated in a sandy area towards the tip of the northern spit; the intent was for the light to serve both as a marker for the entrance and as a warning for the spit. It was immediately discovered that the low-lying site was vulnerable to the waves, and by 1867 the Lighthouse Board was already making plans to relocate the light to a new site on the south side of the entrance. In the meantime a log breakwater was placed around the light. Fog was a major problem, and a steam fog whistle was installed in 1874.

The move was delayed for some decades, and in interim the light experienced numerous injuries from the elements. It was damaged by earthquakes in 1877 and 1882, subsequently leading to substantial bracing and reinforcement. High water in 1885 caused such severe damage that the house was deemed unfit for occupancy, and a temporary shelter was built to house the keeper until a replacement light could be built.

The appropriation for the Table Bluff Light finally came through in 1891, and in October of the following year the lens of the Humboldt Harbor Light was moved to the new lighthouse. The lighthouse was officially closed on 31 October 1892 and the buildings were used by the U.S. Army Corps of Engineers as a field office during improvements to the harbor mouth, then was left to decay, with the central tower eventually collapsing around 1933. All that is left at the site today are foundation walls (which can be viewed in Samoa Dunes Recreation Area at the end of the north spit), though the cupola of the lantern was eventually recovered from the sand and is displayed at the Humboldt Bay Maritime Museum.

== See also ==
- List of lighthouses in the United States
