= Hookton, California =

Coordinates: 40°40′23″N 124°13′06″W

Hookton is a locality located 3.5 miles (5.6 km) south of Fields Landing, at an elevation of 26 feet (7.9 m) in Humboldt County, California.

Hookton is named for its founder, John Hookton.
