= Jolly Giant Creek =

Creek in Arcata, California

Coordinates: 40.8562°N 124.0906°W

Jolly Giant Creek, named after Jolly Giant Mill that was historically located along the creek, is an ephemeral creek in Arcata, California. Jolly Giant Creek has constructed wetlands that were constructed for water quality. In 2014 the North Coast regional water board recommended that Jolly Giant Creek be listed as an impaired waterway due to E. coli contamination 600 times greater than normal.
