= Mad River, California =

Mad River
- census-designated place
- Position in California
- Coordinates: 40°27′00″N 123°30′05″W
- Country: United States
- State: California
- County: Trinity

Area
  - Total: 35.186 sq mi (91.131 km^{2})
  - Land: 35.186 sq mi (91.131 km^{2})
  - Water: 0 sq mi (0 km^{2}) 0%
- Elevation: 2,484 ft (757 m)

Population (2020)
  - Total: 361
  - Density: 10.3/sq mi (3.96/km^{2})
- Time zone: UTC-8 (Pacific (PST))
  - Summer (DST): UTC-7 (PDT)
- ZIP Code: 95552
- Area code: 707
- GNIS feature ID: 2583071

Mad River (formerly Kuntz) is a census-designated place (CDP) in Trinity County, California, United States. Mad River is located in the southern part of the county. Mad River sits at an elevation of 2,484 feet (757 m). The ZIP Code is 95552. Its population is 361 as of the 2020 census, down from 420 from the 2010 census.

Mad River has the last services on California State Route 36 until the Platina Store, 44 miles (71 km) away. Until it closed, the next services were the Wildwood Store, 5 miles (8.0 km) west of Platina. Its post office serves itself and the communities of Dinsmore (Humboldt County), and Van Duzen; both using 95552 as their ZIP code. Ruth residents with Post Office Boxes at the Ruth Store share the 95526 zip code with Bridgeville. Starting in the Spring of 2014, Ruth residents with mail boxes on the Mad River Road are now part of the Mad River zip code and use the city designation of Mad River, CA 95552. Mad River is home to Southern Trinity High School, the region's only high school, with an enrollment of 45 students. It is also home to Van Duzen Elementary School.

== History ==
The stream was named in December 1849 by the Gregg Party. Myth has it that the leader of the party, in apparent anger with fellow companions over latitude positioning, coined the term when comparing the experience of the difficult exchange between his peers.

At the 2000 census, Mad River constituted a census county division (CCD). The population was 838 at the 2000 census. Most of the former CCD is covered by the Six Rivers National Forest and the Shasta-Trinity National Forest. Mad River itself is near the western extent of Ruth Lake, the major water reservoir for the populated area around Humboldt Bay within Humboldt County located to the northwest.

=== Communities within the former CCD ===
Most of the communities that encompass the former Mad River CCD are off main highways and at least 100 miles (160 km) from a major city. The area code for most of the region is 707, because phone service comes from larger communities in Humboldt County, such as Bridgeville or Garberville.

- Mad River
- Ruth is a census-designated place 18 miles (29 km) south of State Highway 36. It is home to Ruth Lake, a long narrow lake primarily used to control flow of water in the Mad River to supply the Humboldt Bay area with drinking water and water for industrial activities. The lake is also used for recreation, irrigation, and hydroelectric power. It has two stores and gas stations and a church.
- Forest Glen is a community along State Highway 36, 23 miles (37 km) southwest of Hayfork. It has a U.S. Forest Service Fire station, and a store that is now closed. Mail and telephone service is from Hayfork. Its former ZIP code is 96030.

=== Creeks, lakes, rivers, and streams ===
- Watts Lake (small pond)
- Ruth Lake
- Horse Ranch Lake (small pond)
- Mud Lake (small pond)
- Antone Lake (pond)
- Minnie Lake (pond)
- Henthorne Lake (pond)
- Turtle Lake (pond)
- Lily Lake (pond)
- Yew Wood Creek
- Anada Creek
- Alder Basin Creek
- Lamb Creek
- Littlefield Creek
- Barry Creek
- Minnie Creek
- North Fork/Middle Fork Eel River
- North Fork Mud River
- Maynard Creek
- Olsen Creek
- South Fork Trinity River

=== Demographics ===
As of the census of 2000, there were 838 people and 433 families residing in the CCD. The population density was 0.4 people/km^{2} (1.0 people/mi^{2}). The racial makeup of the CCD was 86.8% White, 0% African American, 0% Native American, 0% Asian, 8.9% from other races, and 4.3% from two or more races. Hispanic or Latino of any race were 2.1% of the population.

== Geography ==
According to the United States Census Bureau, the CDP covers an area of 35.2 square miles (91 km^{2}), all land.

== Climate ==
This area experiences hot summers and mild winters. According to the Köppen Climate Classification system, Mad River has a warm-summer Mediterranean climate, abbreviated "Csb" on climate maps.

Climate data for Mad River
Month	Jan	Feb	Mar	Apr	May	Jun	Jul	Aug	Sep	Oct	Nov	Dec	Year
Mean daily maximum °F (°C)	50 (10)	53 (12)	56 (13)	61 (16)	69 (21)	77 (25)	89 (32)	89 (32)	85 (29)	72 (22)	57 (14)	49 (9)	67 (20)
Mean daily minimum °F (°C)	31 (−1)	31 (−1)	33 (1)	36 (2)	40 (4)	45 (7)	51 (11)	50 (10)	45 (7)	39 (4)	34 (1)	31 (−1)	39 (4)
Average precipitation inches (mm)	11.08 (281)	10.40 (264)	8.11 (206)	3.81 (97)	1.55 (39)	0.35 (8.9)	0.10 (2.5)	0.40 (10)	1.20 (30)	4.16 (106)	9.78 (248)	11.89 (302)	62.83 (1,594.4)
Average snowfall inches (cm)	9.3 (24)	6.6 (17)	6.8 (17)	1.2 (3.0)	0 (0)	0 (0)	0 (0)	0 (0)	0 (0)	0 (0)	1.6 (4.1)	5.9 (15)	31.4 (80.1)
Average precipitation days	13	12	13	9.5	6	3	1	2	3	7	11.5	13.5	94.5
Average snowy days (≥ 0.1 inch)	2.2	2.1	2	0.8	0.0	0.0	0.0	0.0	0.0	0.0	0.6	2	9.7

== Demographics ==
The 2020 United States census reported that the Mad River CDP had a population of 361. The population density was 10.3 inhabitants per square mile (4.0/km^{2}). The racial makeup of the CDP was 313 (86.7%) White, 0 (0.0%) African American, 9 (2.5%) Native American, 13 (3.6%) Asian, 0 (0.0%) Pacific Islander, 0 (0.0%) from other races, and 26 (7.2%) from two or more races. Hispanic or Latino of any race were 21 persons (5.8%).

The whole population lived in households. There were 169 households, out of which 41 (24.3%) had children under the age of 18 living in them, 71 (42.0%) were married-couple households, 4 (2.4%) were cohabiting couple households, 43 (25.4%) had a female householder with no partner present, and 51 (30.2%) had a male householder with no partner present. 48 households (28.4%) were one person, and 27 (16.0%) were one person aged 65 or older. The average household size was 2.14. There were 101 families (59.8% of all households).

The age distribution was 43 people (11.9%) under the age of 18, 16 people (4.4%) aged 18 to 24, 88 people (24.4%) aged 25 to 44, 123 people (34.1%) aged 45 to 64, and 91 people (25.2%) who were 65 years of age or older. The median age was 54.9 years. For every 100 females, there were 111.1 males.

There were 271 housing units at an average density of 7.7 units per square mile (3.0 units/km^{2}), of which 169 (62.4%) were occupied. Of these, 136 (80.5%) were owner-occupied, and 33 (19.5%) were occupied by renters.

== Politics ==
In the state legislature, Mad River is in the 2nd senatorial district, represented by Democrat Mike McGuire, and the 2nd Assembly district, represented by Democrat Chris Rogers.

Federally, Mad River is in California's 2nd congressional district, represented by Democrat Jared Huffman.
