= Samoa Cookhouse =

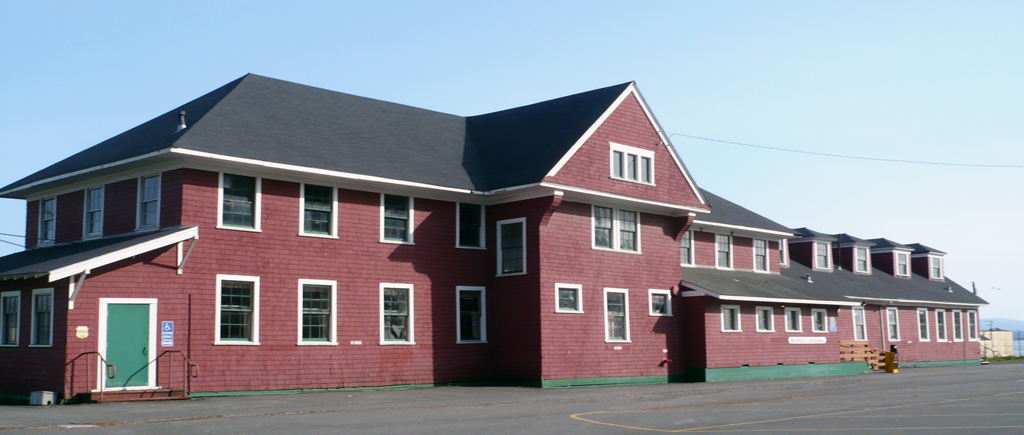

- Location in California

Restaurant information
- Established: 1893
- Location: 908 Vance Ave, Samoa, Humboldt, California, 95564, United States
- Coordinates: 40°49′11.79″N 124°10′54.29″W
- Website: www.samoacookhouse.net

The Samoa Cookhouse is a historic restaurant in Samoa, California, in the United States. It is the last lumber camp-style cookhouse in the American Pacific Northwest.

== Background ==
Originally it was a dining facility for the employees working the mills for the Vance Lumber Company and opened in 1893. The cookhouse opened to the public in the 1960s and serves "lumber camp style", or family style, meals at long communal tables. The building also houses a museum with artifacts and images that focus on logging and "maritime industry" history. The building is large enough to seat five hundred workers and to make cleaning the floors more efficient there were holes drilled into the floor with a grate to act as drainage for water rather than mopping. The second floor of the building functioned as a dormitory for the waitresses. Waitresses were required to be single during the period when the Cookhouse served only company workers, were paid $30 a month, and worked seven days a week. The dormitory has a curfew and was locked at night and the women were not allowed to date on the weekdays. There was, however, a secret passageway that led to the kitchen that waitresses used to leave the dormitory at night.
