= Fairhaven, California =

- Census-designated place
- Location in California Fairhaven (the United States)
- Coordinates: 40°47′06″N 124°12′10″W
- Country: United States
- State: California
- County: Humboldt
- Elevation: 9.8 ft (3 m)

Population (2020)
  - Total: 165
- Time zone: UTC-8 (Pacific)
  - Summer (DST): UTC-7 (PDT)
- ZIP code: 95564
- Area code: 707
- FIPS code: 06-23196
- GNIS feature ID: 2628729

Fairhaven (formerly Rolph) is an unincorporated community and census-designated place (CDP) adjacent to Humboldt Bay in Humboldt County, California, United States. It is located 2.25 miles (3.6 km) west-southwest of downtown Eureka, at an elevation of 10 feet (3.0 m) above sea level. As of the 2020 census, Fairhaven had a population of 165.

The Rolph post office operated from 1918 to 1921. That name was for Governor James Rolph of California. The name "Fairhaven" was taken from Fair Haven, a neighborhood in New Haven, Connecticut.

Simpson historically operated plywood and pulp operations in Fairhaven. Green Diamond, spun off from Simpson, continues to operate a wood chip export facility in Fairhaven.

== Demographics ==
Historical population
Census	Pop.	Note	%±
2020	165		—
U.S. Decennial Census; 2020

Fairhaven first appeared as a census designated place in the 2020 U.S. census.

Fairhaven CDP, California – Racial and ethnic composition Note: the US Census treats Hispanic/Latino as an ethnic category. This table excludes Latinos from the racial categories and assigns them to a separate category. Hispanics/Latinos may be of any race.
Race / Ethnicity (NH = Non-Hispanic)	Pop 2020	2020
White alone (NH)	125	75.76%
Black or African American alone (NH)	2	1.21%
Native American or Alaska Native alone (NH)	2	1.21%
Asian alone (NH)	6	3.64%
Native Hawaiian or Pacific Islander alone (NH)	1	0.61%
Other race alone (NH)	1	0.61%
Mixed race or Multiracial (NH)	21	12.73%
Hispanic or Latino (any race)	7	4.24%
Total	165	100.00%
