= Manila, California =

Manila
- census-designated place
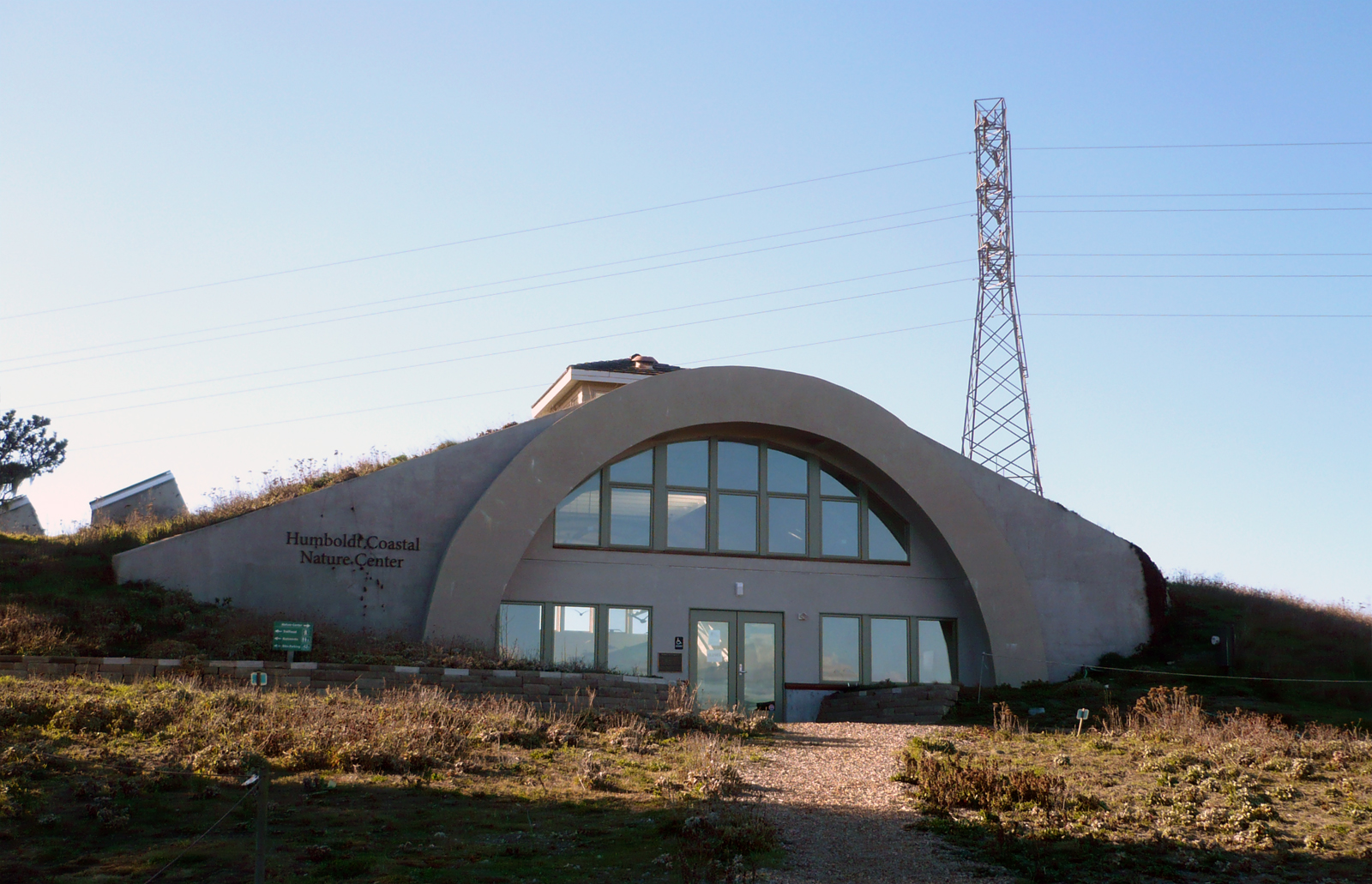
- The Friends of the Dunes nature center in Manila.

- Location in California
- Coordinates: 40°51′06″N 124°09′44″W
- Country: United States
- State: California
- County: Humboldt

Area
  - Total: 0.704 sq mi (1.823 km^{2})
  - Land: 0.697 sq mi (1.805 km^{2})
  - Water: 0.0069 sq mi (0.018 km^{2}) 0.98%
- Elevation: 13 ft (4 m)

Population (2020)
  - Total: 798
  - Density: 1,150/sq mi (442/km^{2})
- Time zone: UTC-8 (Pacific (PST))
  - Summer (DST): UTC-7 (PDT)
- ZIP Code: 95521
- Area code: 707
- GNIS feature IDs: 228014; 2628755

Manila is a census-designated place located adjacent to Humboldt Bay in Humboldt County, California, United States. It is located 3.25 miles (5.2 km) north of downtown Eureka, at an elevation of 13 feet (4 m). The ZIP Code is 95521. The population was 798 at the 2020 census.

== History ==
The town was founded at the end of World War II, and named after Manila in the Philippines. Humboldt Coastal Nature Center of Friends of the Dunes on Stamps Lane includes the Stamps Dune House and surrounding dune landscape. The house was originally built in 1985 as a retirement home of a couple whose heirs sold a large part of their property and the house to Manila-based Friends of the Dunes to use as a nature center on the dunes in 2007.

== Demographics ==
Historical population
Census	Pop.	Note	%±
2010	784		—
2020	798		1.8%
U.S. Decennial Census; 1860–1870 1880-1890; 1900 1910 1920; 1930 1940 1950; 1960 1970 1980; 1990 2000 2010

Manila first appeared as a census designated place in the 2010 U.S. census.

The 2020 United States census reported that Manila had a population of 798. The population density was 1,144.9 inhabitants per square mile (442.0/km^{2}). The racial makeup of Manila was 621 (77.8%) White, 11 (1.4%) African American, 27 (3.4%) Native American, 8 (1.0%) Asian, 3 (0.4%) Pacific Islander, 32 (4.0%) from other races, and 96 (12.0%) from two or more races. Hispanic or Latino of any race were 83 persons (10.4%).

The whole population lived in households. There were 361 households, out of which 67 (18.6%) had children under the age of 18 living in them, 106 (29.4%) were married-couple households, 59 (16.3%) were cohabiting couple households, 67 (18.6%) had a female householder with no partner present, and 129 (35.7%) had a male householder with no partner present. 121 households (33.5%) were one person, and 49 (13.6%) were one person aged 65 or older. The average household size was 2.21. There were 178 families (49.3% of all households).

The age distribution was 123 people (15.4%) under the age of 18, 77 people (9.6%) aged 18 to 24, 266 people (33.3%) aged 25 to 44, 184 people (23.1%) aged 45 to 64, and 148 people (18.5%) who were 65 years of age or older. The median age was 39.4 years. For every 100 females, there were 112.8 males.

There were 400 housing units at an average density of 573.9 units per square mile (221.6 units/km^{2}), of which 361 (90.3%) were occupied. Of these, 174 (48.2%) were owner-occupied, and 187 (51.8%) were occupied by renters.

== Government ==
In the state legislature, Manila is in the 2nd senatorial district, represented by Democrat Mike McGuire, and the 2nd Assembly district, represented by Democrat Chris Rogers, as of July 2024.

Federally, it is in California's 2nd congressional district, represented by Democrat Jared Huffman since 2013.
