= Seth Kinman =

American pioneer (1815–1888)

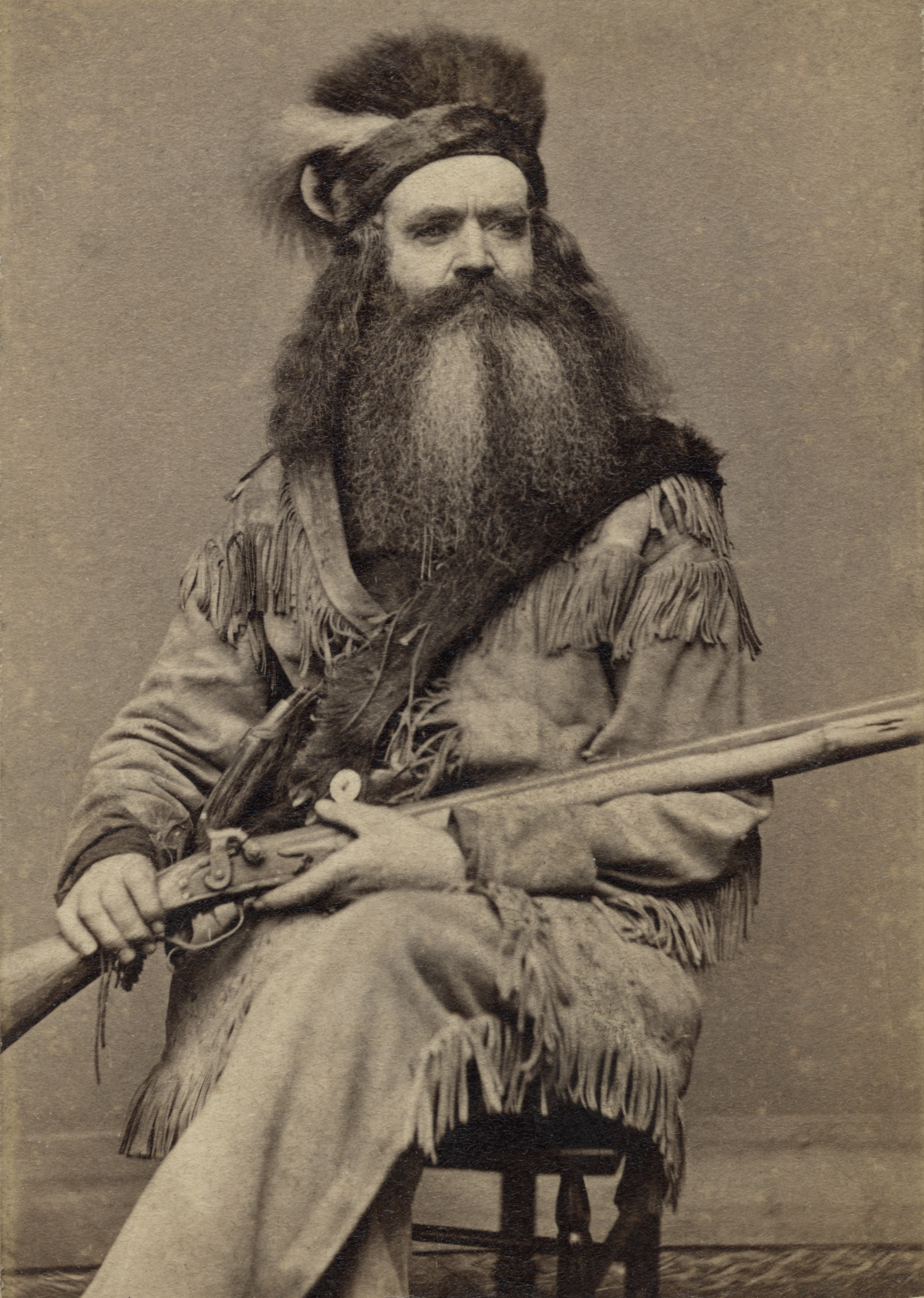
- Carte de visite of Seth Kinman in 1864
- Born: September 29, 1815; Union County, Pennsylvania, US
- Died: February 24, 1888 (aged 72); Table Bluff, California, US
- Resting place: Table Bluff Cemetery, Loleta, California; 40.6495°N 124.2093°W
- Occupations: Hunter; Prospector; Fur trapper; Hotel keeper; Saloon keeper; Chair maker; Musician; Entertainer
- Known for: Presidential chairs
- Spouse: Anna Maria Sharpless (m. 1840; died 1853)
- Children: 5

Seth Kinman (September 29, 1815 – February 24, 1888) was an early settler of Humboldt County, California, a hunter based in Fort Humboldt, a famous chair maker, and a nationally recognized entertainer. He stood over 6 ft (1.83 m) tall and was known for his hunting prowess and his brutality toward bears and Indian warriors. Kinman claimed to have shot a total of over 800 grizzly bears, and, in a single month, over 50 elk. He was also a hotel keeper, saloon keeper, and a musician who performed for President Lincoln on a fiddle made from the skull of a mule.

Known for his publicity seeking, Kinman appeared as a stereotypical mountain man dressed in buckskins on the U.S. East Coast and selling cartes de visites of himself and his famous chairs. The chairs were made from elkhorns and grizzly bear skins and given to U.S. Presidents. Presidents so honored include James Buchanan, Abraham Lincoln, Andrew Johnson, and Rutherford Hayes. He may have had a special relationship with President Lincoln, appearing in at least two of Lincoln's funeral corteges, and claiming to have witnessed Lincoln's assassination.

His autobiography, dictated to a scribe in 1876, was first published in 2010 and is noted for putting "the entertainment value of a story ahead of the strict facts." His descriptions of events change with his retelling of them. Contemporary journalists and modern writers were clearly aware of the stories contained in the autobiography, "but each chooses which version to accept."

== Early life ==
Seth Kinman's father, James Kinman, ran a ferry across the West Branch Susquehanna River in central Pennsylvania, in an area then called Uniontown, now called Allenwood in Gregg Township, Union County. James also was a millwright and an inn-keeper, whose forebears were Quakers from Bucks County, Pennsylvania.

Seth's mother, Eleanor Bower Kinman, was of German descent whose family lived in Reading, Pennsylvania.

Seth was born in Uniontown in 1815. While in Pennsylvania, he learned to read and write, "I could form good letters with a pen but I never learned to spell well." In 1830 his father took the family and migrated to Tazewell County, Illinois.

In his autobiography, Seth stated that his father fought in the Blackhawk War in Illinois in 1832. He also claimed that his father and Abraham Lincoln fought together in the war, became friends afterward, and that Seth met the future president during Lincoln's circuit-riding days in Illinois.

During this time period, the Kinmans acquired a rifle, known as "Old Cotton Bale," that Seth kept throughout his life. The rifle had a 4 ft (1.2 m) long barrel and "is supposed to have killed Gen'l Peckenham" at the Battle of New Orleans in 1815. With some skepticism, Anspach relates a long history of the rifle, gleaned from an 1864 local newspaper story on Kinman, of a renegade Kentucky sniper shooting the British general while carrying on a conversation with American General Andrew Jackson.

Seth spent ten years working in his father's mill in Illinois, sawing lumber and grinding grain. After his father's death in 1839, he sold the mill and tried farming. He married Anna Maria Sharpless, of Catawissa, Pennsylvania, in 1840 and they had five children together: James (1842), Carlin, who is sometimes called Calvin (1846), Austin (1847), Ellen (1849), and Roderick (1851). Anna Maria and two of their sons, James and Austin, died during the winter of 1852–1853, while Seth was in California.

By 1848 Kinman was operating the Eagle Hotel in Pekin, Illinois, on the Illinois River. The hotel was known less for its comforts than for Kinman's rendition of the fiddle tune "Arkansas Traveler".

A traveler came off a steamboat one day and went to the Eagle Hotel. There had been a little western "scrimmage" at the "Eagle" the night before, and though things had not been put in order, the proprietor, Seth Kinman, was sitting in front of the door, playing his favorite tune, the "Arkansaw Traveler", with the greatest self-satisfaction.

The stranger, stopping, said to Seth: "Are you the proprietor here?"

Seth, without resting his bow, replied: "Wall, I reckon I be, stranger".

"Do you keep tavern?"

"Of course I do: I keep tavern like h—l," said Seth, fiddling away with all his might, "Just pile in: hang your freight on the floor, and make yourself at home." "The boys," continued Seth, "have been having a little fun, but if there is a whole table or plate in the house, I'll get you some cold hash toward night." The stranger didn't like this peculiarly western reception, so took his departure, leaving Kinman still enjoying his violin.

— William H. Bates, Souvenir in the History of Early and Notable Events in North West Territory Illinois and Tazewell County (1916), page 15

== Life in California ==
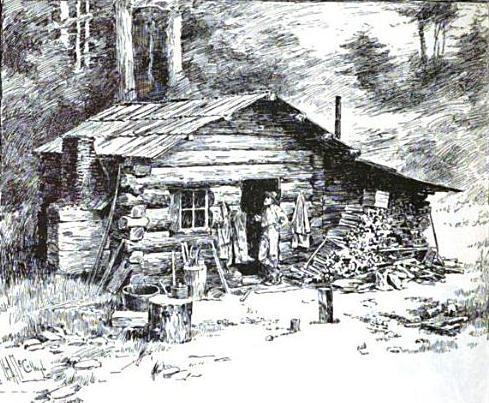
Drawing of an early hunter's cabin in Humboldt County.

Kinman claimed to have migrated to California in 1849 during the great Gold Rush and worked as a prospector in Pierson B. Reading's party on the Trinity River near present-day Douglas City. He then returned to Illinois for two years. In 1852, he travelled to California and explored the Humboldt Bay area, near present-day Eureka, California. Humboldt Bay had been recently rediscovered by gold miners seeking a faster and cheaper route to transport supplies. An early settlement in the area was also named Uniontown, but is now known as Arcata. During this period, prospectors and their suppliers were often flush with gold, but had little to spend it on.

On Christmas, 1852 Kinman was hired to perform on fiddle at the then exorbitant amount of $50, despite his lack of musical training. As described by a fellow '49er:

Seth Kinman, the noted hunter and antler chair-maker, and myself were tendered fifty dollars each to preside as the orchestra for a Christmas ball at Uniontown in 1852. Kinman's repertoire consisted mainly of an alternation of the "Arkansaw Traveler" and "Hell on the Wabash" and mine was little more varied or pretentious. He responded. My conscience has not yet reached that level of elasticity.

— David Rohrer Leeper, The Argonauts of 'forty-nine: Some Recollections of the Plains and the Diggings (1895), page 135

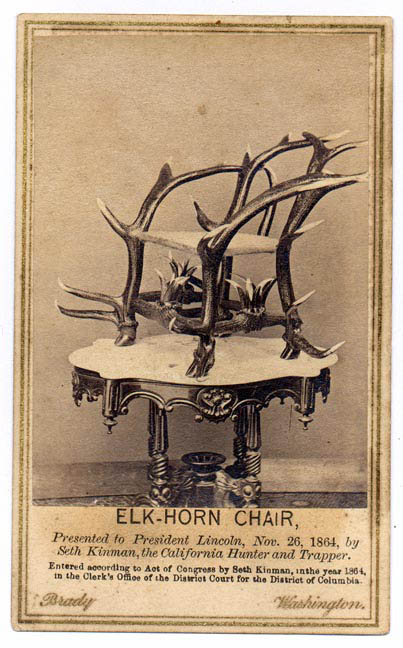
Elkhorn chair presented to President Abraham Lincoln. Photo by Mathew Brady

Over the winter of 1852–1853 he lived in what is now Ferndale in the cabin of Stephen Shaw. His wife and two of their children died that winter, and he may have gone back to Illinois to bring back his mother and three remaining children by 1854.

In 1853 he started working as a hunter, feeding U.S. troops in Fort Humboldt. While at Fort Humboldt he met future president Ulysses S. Grant, and future General George Crook. According to tradition, about this time, he brought the first herd of cattle to Humboldt County.

Some events and their timing are unclear during this early period. Sources disagree on whether he brought his family to California from Illinois in 1852 or 1854. Carranco dates Seth's first return to Illinois starting in 1850, with his return to California in August 1852, his arrival in Humboldt County in February 1853, another return to Illinois in September 1853, and a trip back to California starting in May 1854 with his mother, two children, and a herd of cattle. Thus, in the course of the six years 1849–1854, he is believed to have crossed the Great Plains, Rocky Mountains, and the Sierra Nevada Mountains five times, travelling mostly on foot.

Kinman lived in several places in the county, including houses near Fern Cottage and a dairy farm on Bear River Ridge. He bought 80 acres (320,000 m^{2}) of farm or ranch land 1 mi (1.6 km) east of the future Table Bluff Lighthouse in October 1858, and about 10 mi (16 km) south of Fort Humboldt. This was the first purchase of land in the Humboldt Land District, which was established by an Act of Congress in March 1858. He later built a hotel and bar on the site.

Kinman made his name first as a hunter, especially as a hunter of grizzly bears. California was noted for its large population of grizzlies. Seth's son Carlin claimed that they once saw 40 grizzlies at one time. But by 1868, the last grizzly in Humboldt County had been killed. While Kinman was on his way to deliver one of the presidential chairs, he met Methodist bishop and writer Oscar Penn Fitzgerald on a California steamboat. Fitzgerald recorded his impressions in the sketch The Ethics of Grizzly Hunting. He presented Kinman as a drunkard who cruelly abused Indians and grizzly bears.

His countenance was expressive of a mixture of brutality, cunning, and good humor. He was a thorough animal. Wild frontier life had not sublimated this old sinner in the way pictured by writers who romance about such things at a distance.

— Oscar Penn Fitzgerald

Kinman's eyes made a special impression on Fitzgerald. Decades later he compared Kinman's eyes to those of the California bandit Tiburcio Vásquez, "His eyes were nature's special label of one of her malignest creations. Only in two other human beings have I ever seen such eyes as those.... It was the eye of a wild beast, the baleful glitter you have seen in the eyes of snakes, panthers, catamounts, or other creatures of the reptile or feline kind."

During a gale on the night of January 5–6, 1860, Kinman was alerted by distress signals from the SS Northerner, which had been breached by a submerged rock. Kinman tethered himself to the shore and waded into the surf to rescue passengers. In all, 70 people were saved by various means and 38 people perished. He was hailed as a hero and awarded a Bible and free life-time passage on the Pacific Mail Steamship Company's ships.

=== Relations with Native Americans ===
Native Americans in northern California suffered greatly at the hands of European-Americans in the last half of the 19th century, and their population declined. The Wiyot people, who live around Humboldt Bay, were particularly hard hit. Their population declined from about 1,500-2,000 in 1850 to about 200 in 1860.

Kinman's brutality was noted by James R. Duff, a fellow '49er, who described him as "an avowed enemy of the red man, ... (who) shot an Indian on sight." Carranco states that "Seth always took an Indian along on a hunt – partly to carry the game, but primarily to serve as bear bait," and concludes "sometimes he regarded them (Indians) as human beings ... other times, only as predatory animals to shoot at." Kinman himself claimed to be an official Indian agent, though there is little evidence that he actually served in the position. He collected "Indian artifacts" including scalps, which he claimed to have taken himself.

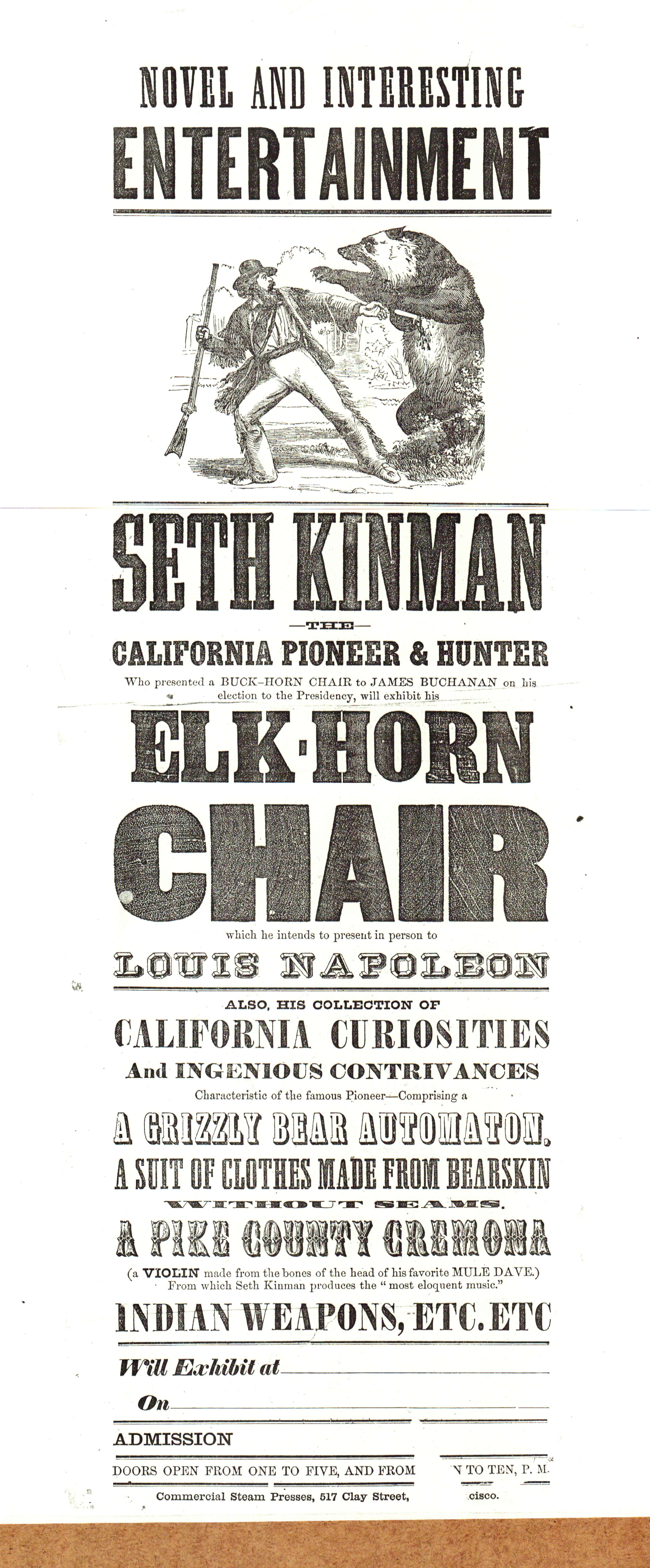
Advertisement used for exhibitions in 1861

Kinman had terrible relations with the Wiyot Tribe who continue to live on Table Bluff, near his farm, at Table Bluff Reservation. The key event in Wiyot history was the February 25–26, 1860 Wiyot Massacre on Indian Island, when over one hundred Wiyot were murdered in their sleep. At the same time there were massacres of the Wiyot at other sites, possibly including Table Bluff. Kinman has not been specifically identified as one of the murderers. Nevertheless, in May 1860 he was elected to represent Bear River at a county-wide meeting ostensibly called to discuss ways to protect white settlers from the Indians. In 1864 he scouted for Captain William Hull's California Volunteers, which according to Kinman, "slaughtered and captured Indians, and at one time they took as many as 160 captives to Fort Humboldt."

=== Life as an entertainer ===
While delivering an elkhorn chair to President Buchanan in 1857, Kinman said, "l awoke one fine morning and found myself famous." He made use of this fame starting in the summer of 1861, together with ventriloquist and magician J. G. Kenyon, by opening an exhibit, first in Eureka and then in San Francisco in August of that same year. Kinman displayed his "curiosities" including an elkhorn chair, mounted grizzly bears, several fiddles, and scalps, and gave a lecture.

How they shouted and yelled when I related some of my old 'bar' stories and hair-breadth escapes, and played on that fiddle made out of the skull bones. That got them! I would wind up on the "Arkansas Traveler" and their enthusiasm wound up to the highest pitch. Before I fetched my 'bar', I would horrify them by telling them how the 'bar' tore Indian children to pieces, and how I finally trapped the 'bar' with a young dead Indian. Then the 'bar' was led out by a chain, and he would dance before he unbuttoned himself and out stepped a man. Then I had to explain about the 'bar' skin. Then I told the audience how I sawed off those Indian scalps the ladies looked horrified and aghast. Then I would tell about the Indian way of life. I would finish up by describing my elkhorn chair and how I had constructed it.

— Seth Kinman, Carranco page 39

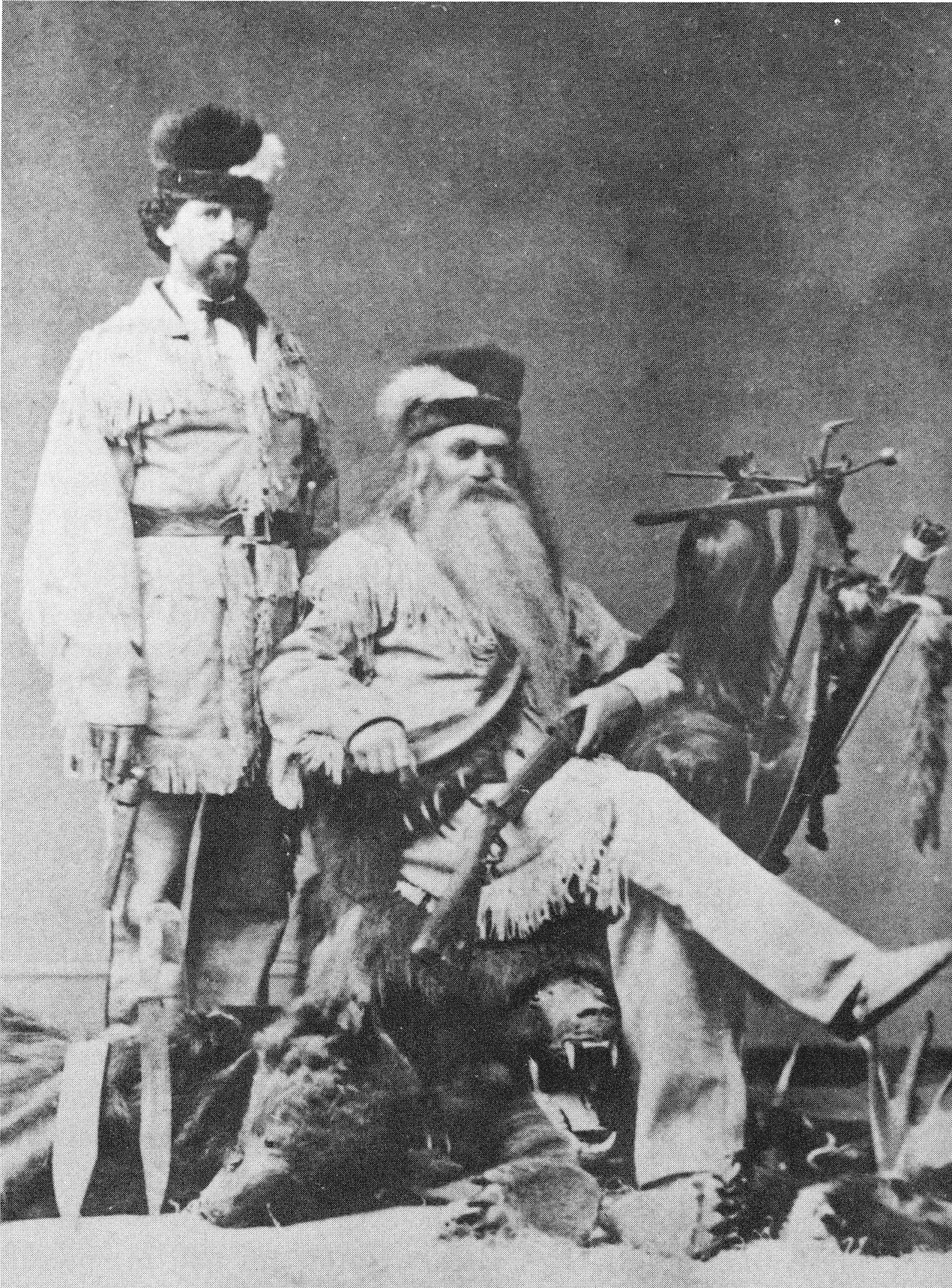
Seth Kinman (seated) with his son Carlin, displaying a few curiosities in 1876

They then toured gold mining camps and the San Francisco Bay area as entertainers. Later he opened a traveling "museums of curiosities" in Eureka, San Francisco, Sacramento and Los Angeles.

During his trip to the East Coast in 1864–1866, Kinman exhibited his curiosities including his chairs, primarily in Pennsylvania and Illinois. He took a ten-year-old Native American boy, named Burtch or Burtchfield, with him on this trip, but Burtch died in December, 1864. Kinman said that he took the boy on the trip because he had killed both of Burtch's parents.

Kinman may have also displayed his chairs at the Philadelphia Centennial Exposition in 1876.

As late as 1885, Kinman opened a museum in Los Angeles with his sons Carlin and Roderick.

== Presidential chairs ==
Kinman first used the large number of elkhorns shed near his farm every year to create a fence. With the help of George Hill, about 1856 he created his first elkhorn chair, which he traded to Dr. Josiah Simpson of Fort Humboldt for a telescope. The construction of an elkhorn chair included using matching horns to make the front legs and arms of the chair. These horns interlocked with another matching pair, which formed the rear legs and the back of the chair. An elk-hide seat was added, along with actual elk feet as the feet of the chair, and the horns were connected beneath the seat.

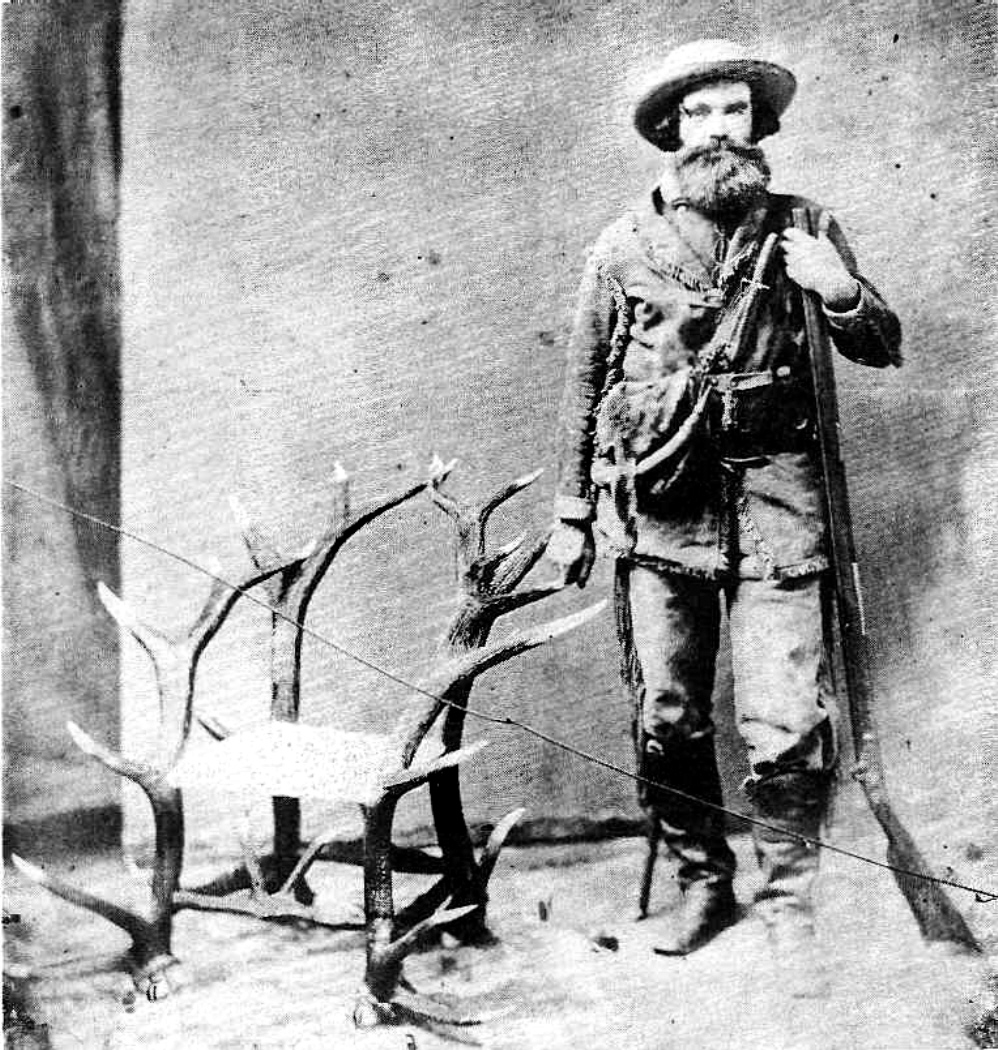
Kinman in 1857 with the chair he presented to Buchanan

Inspired by the 1856 election of James Buchanan, a fellow Pennsylvanian, to the presidency, Kinman built his first presidential elkhorn chair and brought it to Washington.

I kill deer and elk meat up in Humboldt County. My range is from Bear Valley into Oregon. This winter I killed considerable meat so I thought I would take it easy and set about to make this cheer with a view of sending it on to Washington for Old Buck. After I got it finished, though, the boys up in our parts thought it enough to travel on; so I thought I would try and go on with it to Washington myself, leaving my mother and four children behind, and started with nothing but my rifle and powder horn. Nobody has yet sot in this cheer, and never shall till after the President.

— Seth Kinman

He arranged free passage on the ship Golden Age to Panama, then to New York, and finally to Washington.

With some help from Peter Donahue and O.M. Wozencraft, on May 26, 1857, after an introduction from the Commissioner of Indian Affairs James W. Denver, Kinman presented the chair to Buchanan. The President was so pleased by the present that he bought Kinman a rifle and two pistols in return.

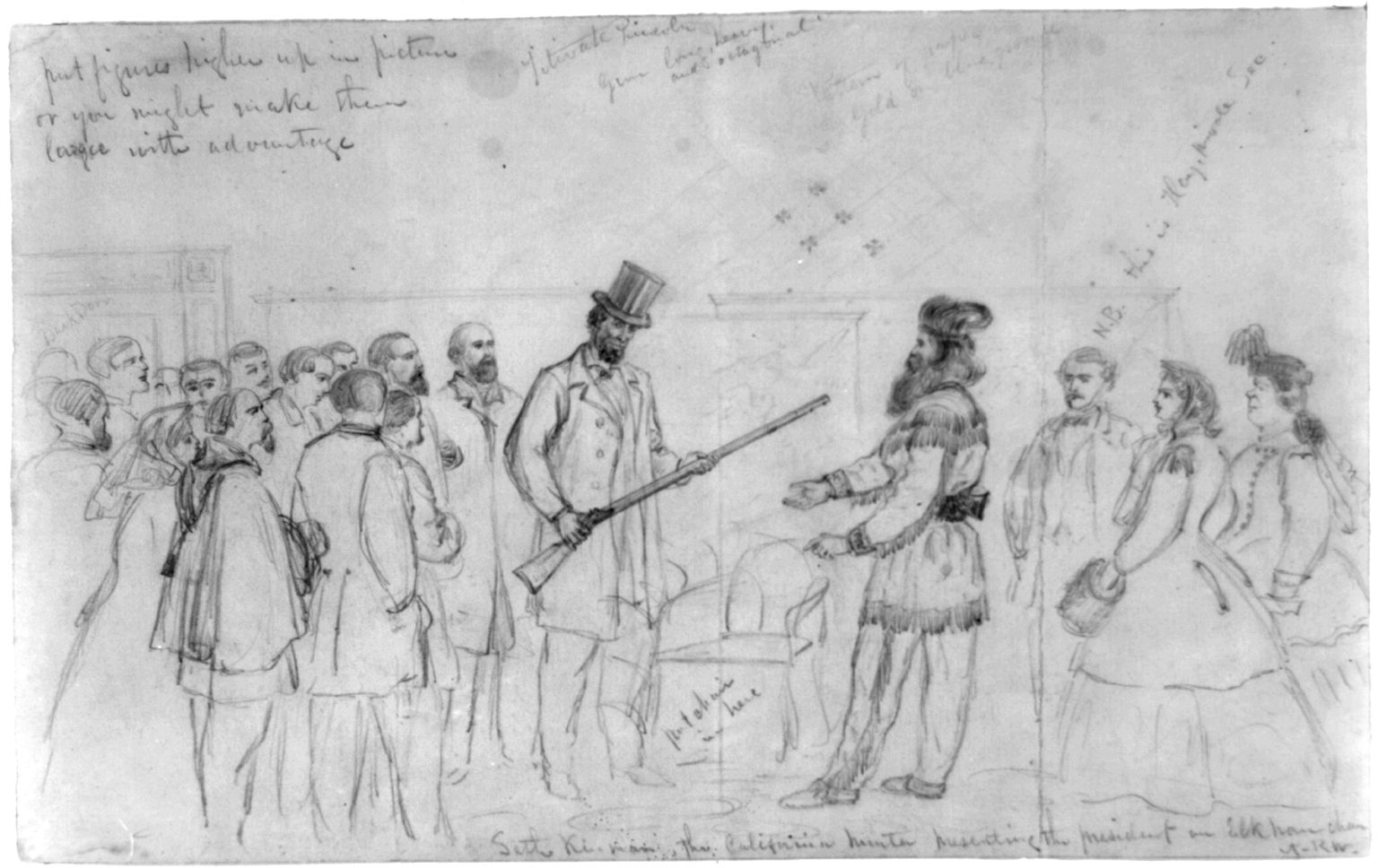
Lincoln examining Kinman's rifle in 1864, while accepting an elkhorn chair. Drawing by Alfred Waud.

In 1861 he advertised that he had made a chair that he would present to Napoleon III. Later, because of French involvement in Mexico, he abandoned the idea. Kinman took two chairs on his 1864 trip to the East Coast for use in exhibitions.

Kinman's presentation of an elkhorn chair to President Abraham Lincoln at 10 a.m. on Saturday, November 26, 1864, was recorded by artist Alfred Waud, the only known picture of Lincoln accepting a gift. The drawing shows Lincoln examining Kinman's rifle, which he called "Ol' Cottonblossum." Kinman also presented a fiddle made from the skull and a rib of his favorite mule and played the instrument.

Much to the amusement of Lincoln and other spectators, he played 'Essence of Old Virginia' and 'John Brown' on the bones of the mule. Lincoln said that if he could play the fiddle he would ask him for it, but since he could not, the fiddle would be better off in Mr. Kinman's hands.

— Stanley Kimmel., Mr. Lincoln's Washington, page 157

Within three weeks, Lincoln stated that he would prefer to eat Kinman's chair, antlers and all, than to appoint a certain office-seeker.

The following April, Kinman marched in President Lincoln's funeral cortege in Washington.

Kinman in the chair he presented to President Andrew Johnson in 1865

Kinman was allegedly in Ford's Theater the night of the assassination and witnessed the murder. He escorted Lincoln's body on its way to burial as far as Columbus, Ohio. On April 26, 1865, the New York Times described Kinman in the funeral cortege in New York City: "Much attention was attracted to Mr. Kinman, who walked in a full hunting suit of buckskin and fur, rifle on shoulder. Mr. Kinman, it will be remembered, presented to Mr. Lincoln some time ago a chair made of California elk-horn, and continuing his acquaintance with him, it is said, enjoyed quite a long conversation with him the very day before the murder."

During his stays on the East Coast, many cartes de visites photographs of Kinman and his chairs were taken by Mathew Brady. Kinman claimed to have paid Brady $2,100 in one three-month period for photos at 8 cents apiece, which calculates to an unlikely amount of over 26,000 photographs. Kinman sold these photographs, among other places, in the U.S. Capitol. He also toured the country, performing in his buckskins as a frontier story teller and fiddle player.

Kinman's tour de force in presidential chairs was presented to President Andrew Johnson on September 8, 1865.

This was intended to surpass all his previous efforts, and was made from two grizzly bears captured by Seth. The four legs and claws were those of a huge grizzly and the back and sides ornamented with immense claws. The seat was soft and exceedingly comfortable, but the great feature of the chair was that, by touching a cord, the head of the monster grizzly bear with jaws extended, would dart out in front from under the seat, snapping and gnashing its teeth as natural as life.

— Marshall R. Anspach, The Lost History of Seth Kinman (1947)

Johnson kept the chair in his White House library, the Yellow Oval Room.

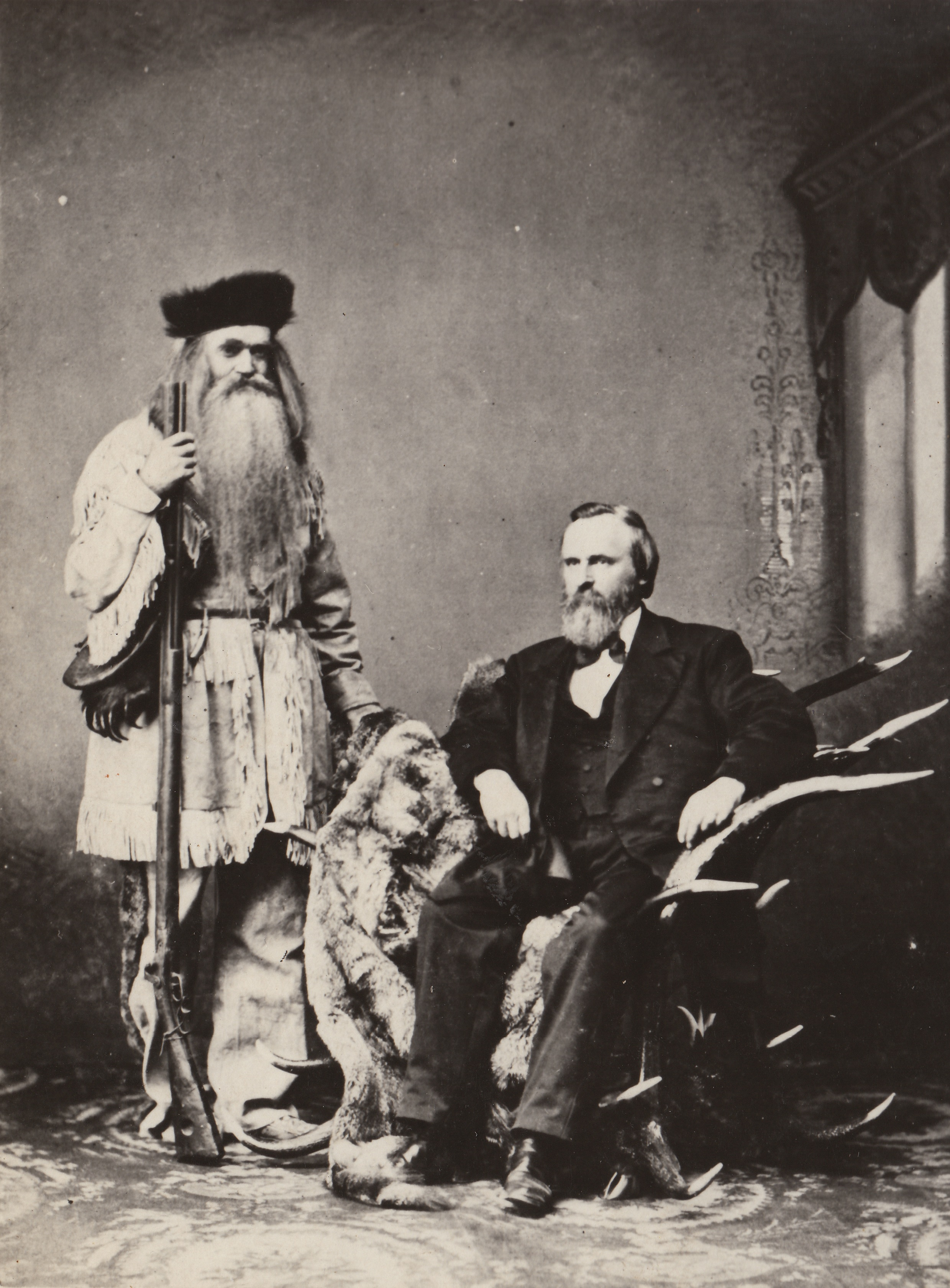
Kinman and Governor Rutherford B. Hayes on September 18, 1876

On September 18, 1876, Kinman presented an elkhorn chair to Governor Rutherford Hayes of Ohio, who was soon to become the President of the United States. The chair is now displayed in the Rutherford B. Hayes Presidential Center in Fremont, Ohio. He later gave a chair constructed of bearskin and other bear body parts to Hayes's vice-president William A. Wheeler.

== Legacy ==
In 1876, Kinman dictated his memoirs, but they were not published until 2010. Dictated to an "H. Niebur," they were originally titled Seth Kinman: Life and Adventures of the Renowned Humboldt and Trapper, Guide and Explorer. He also kept an extensive scrapbook of newspaper articles. About 1930, a one-time neighbor of Kinman, George Richmond, copied the memoirs and the scrapbook by hand. Original pieces of H. Niebur's dictations appear in Richmond's manuscript. Portions of H. Niebur's work is available for viewing at Humboldt State University Special Collections. The original manuscript and scrapbook were then sent to a potential publisher or agent, and lost after Richmond's death. The published version is from Richmond's copy. Richmond also recalled many of Kinman's stories and collected others from Kinman's family and friends, then retold these stories in a book now published as I'm a Gonna Tell Ya a Yarn.

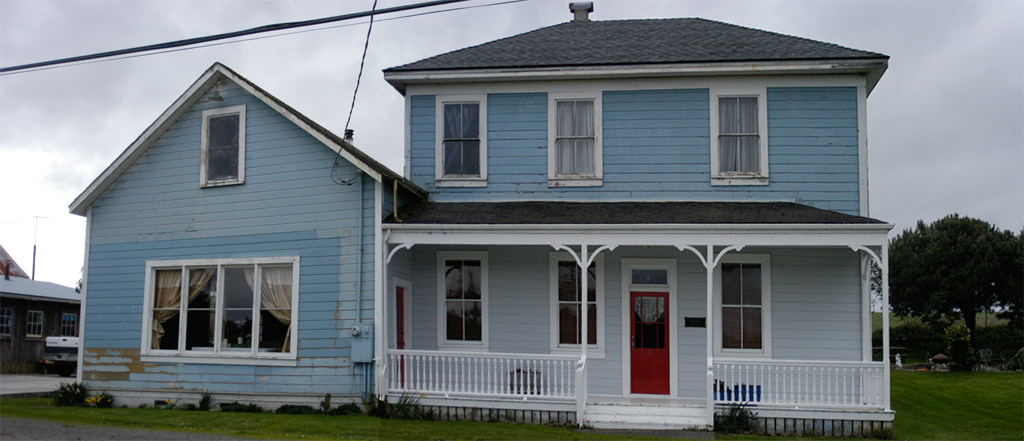
Seth Kinman's hotel and bar in 2010

In his later years, Kinman lived in Table Bluff, California with his family, where he owned a hotel and bar. In 1886, Kinman was preparing to send chairs to President Grover Cleveland and former presidential candidate General Winfield Scott Hancock. He died in 1888 after accidentally shooting himself in the leg. He was interred at Table Bluff Cemetery in Loleta, California, in his buckskin clothing.

External videos
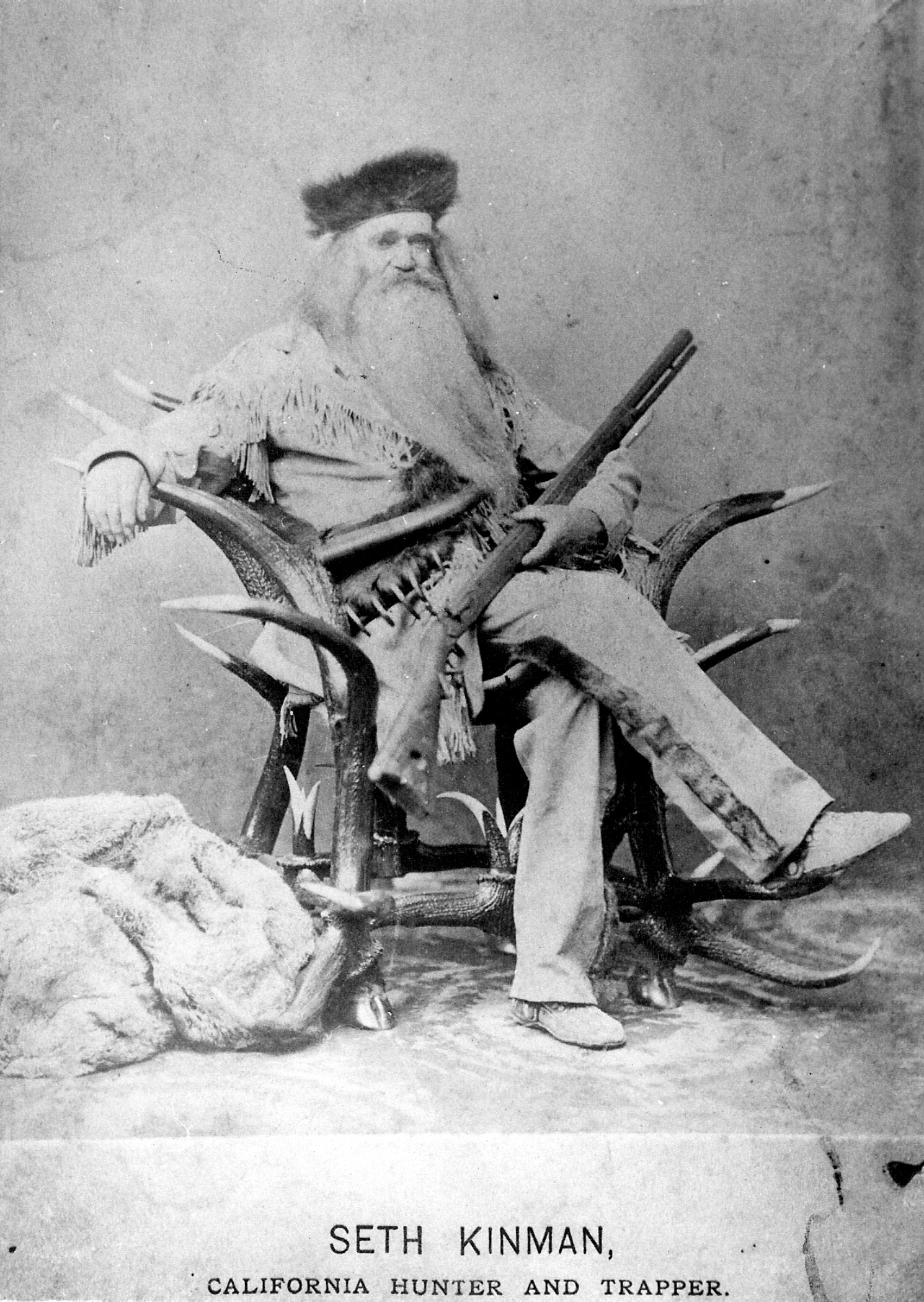
- The Rifle of Real-Life Mountain Man Seth Kinman, Rock Island Auction Company, 8:12
- Appraisal: Seth Kinman's Colt Model 1851 Presentation Pistol, Antiques Road Show, PBS, 9:03

Mrs. R.F. Herrick bought Kinman's traveling museum collection of 186 items, including at least two of his famous chairs, and displayed them in San Francisco in 1893. She then took the collection to Chicago to display them at the 1893 World's Columbian Exposition, where she reportedly sold the individual items.

The Clarke Historical Museum in Eureka once displayed a suit of his buckskins, complete with beaded moccasins, as well as a wooden chest he owned, but no longer does so due to Kinman's problematic legacy. The Ferndale Museum displays several Kinman items, including another of his buckskin suits.

=== Kinman's guns ===
At least two of Kinman's guns are believed to have survived and have been exhibited on video. His long rifle "Old Cotton Blossum" was placed for sale in 2018 at an Illinois auction house with an estimated sales price of $20,000 – $40,000. The auction house reported that the gun was offered for sale by a Kinman biographer Alan W. Maki, who bought the rifle from Kinman's great-great-granddaughter.

One of two pistols given to Kinman by President Buchanan was shown on Antiques Roadshow and valued for insurance purposes at about $50,000. It is a 36 caliber Colt model 1851 made in Hartford, Connecticut. Kinman modified the pistol, trimming the hammer and adding a front blade site made of horn or bone.

== Gallery ==
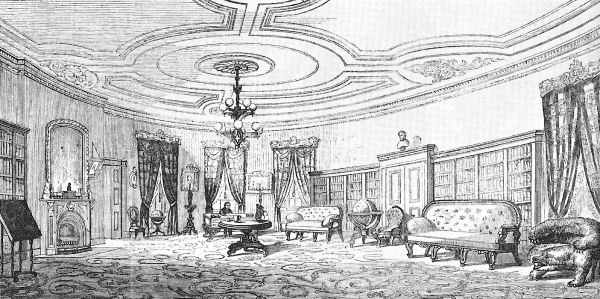
White House Yellow Oval Room, c. 1868 showing Kinman's chair at far right

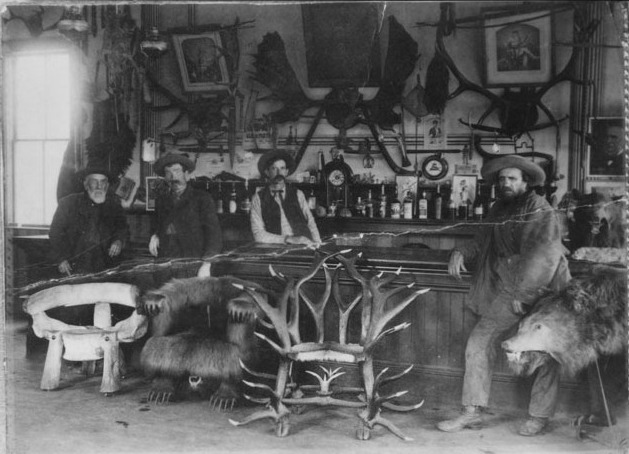
Kinman's bar in Table Bluff in 1889, with three chairs displayed

Mule skull fiddle and chair displayed at the World's Columbian Exposition

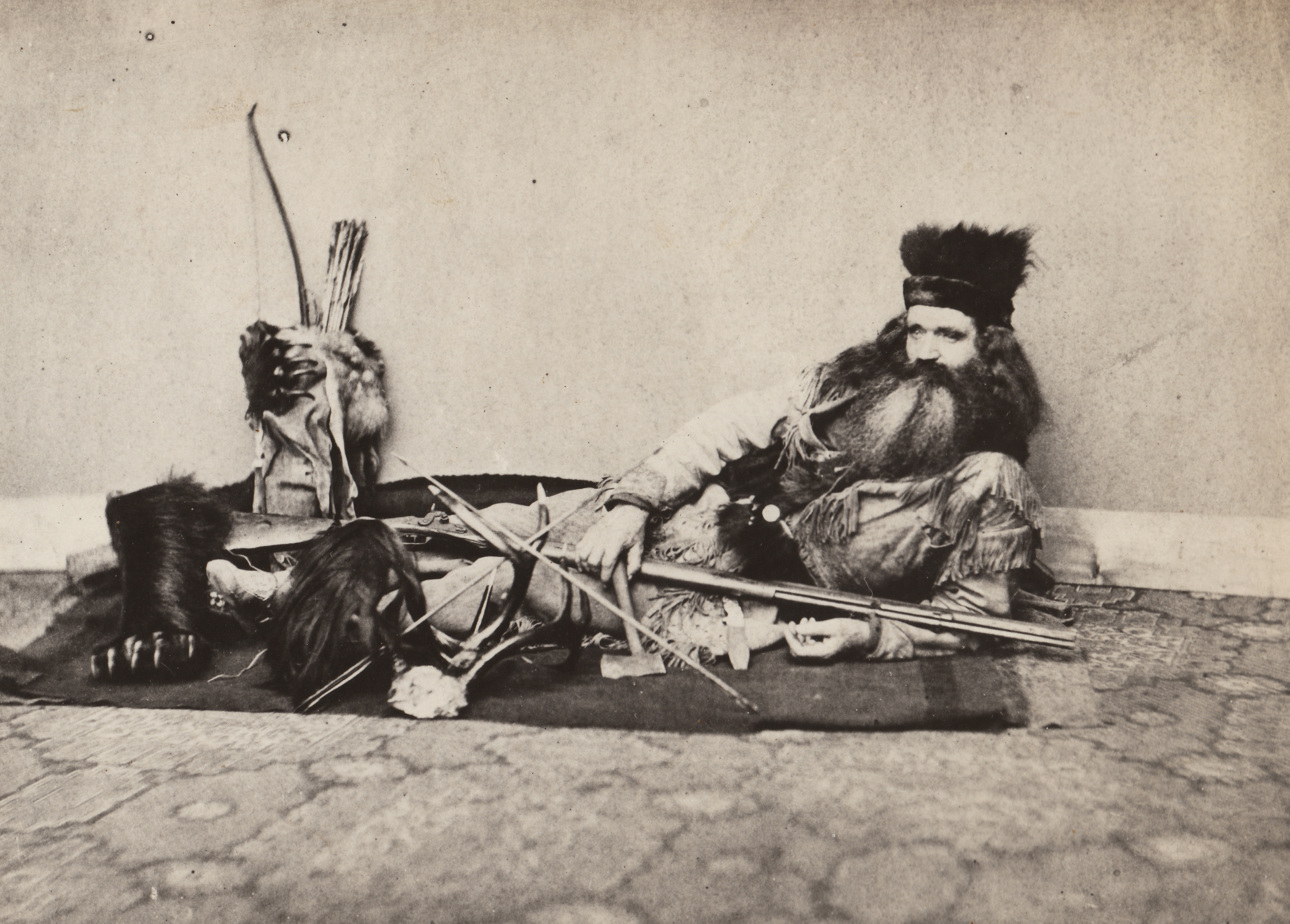
Kinman with his rifle, elk horns, bear feet, a bow and arrows, hatchet, and scalps

== See also ==
- Bald Hills War
- Mountain men
- Fur trappers
- North American fur trade
- Southport Landing

== Sources ==
- Autobiography:The Seth Kinman Story, 1876, handwritten manuscript dictated by Kinman, with additions and comments by H. Niebur, pp. 319, available in the Andrew Genzoli Collection, Humboldt State University Library
  - available as "Seth Kinman's Manuscript and Scrapbook," transcribed by Richard H. Roberts, published by Ferndale Museum, 2010.
  - other holdings at the Humboldt State University Library on Kinman
- Marshall R. Anspach, The Lost History of Seth Kinman, 1947
- Lynwood Carranco. September/October 1984. "The Curious Life and Bloody Times of Seth Kinman." The Californian, 2(5), 32–41, available in the Andrew Genzoli Collection, Humboldt State University Library
- Vanessa Bateman, "Ursus horribilis: Seth Kinman’s Grizzly Chair," RACAR: revue d'art canadienne / Canadian Art Review, Vol. 43, No. 1, 2018
