= Table Bluff =

Table Bluff may refer to:

- Table Bluff (California), geologic feature
- Table Bluff, California, unincorporated community
- Table Bluff Rancheria, Wiyot reservation
- Table Bluff Reservation--Wiyot Tribe, Native American tribe
- Table Bluff Light, lighthouse
