= Loleta, California =

Loleta, California Swauger and Swauger's Station
- unincorporated community census-designated place
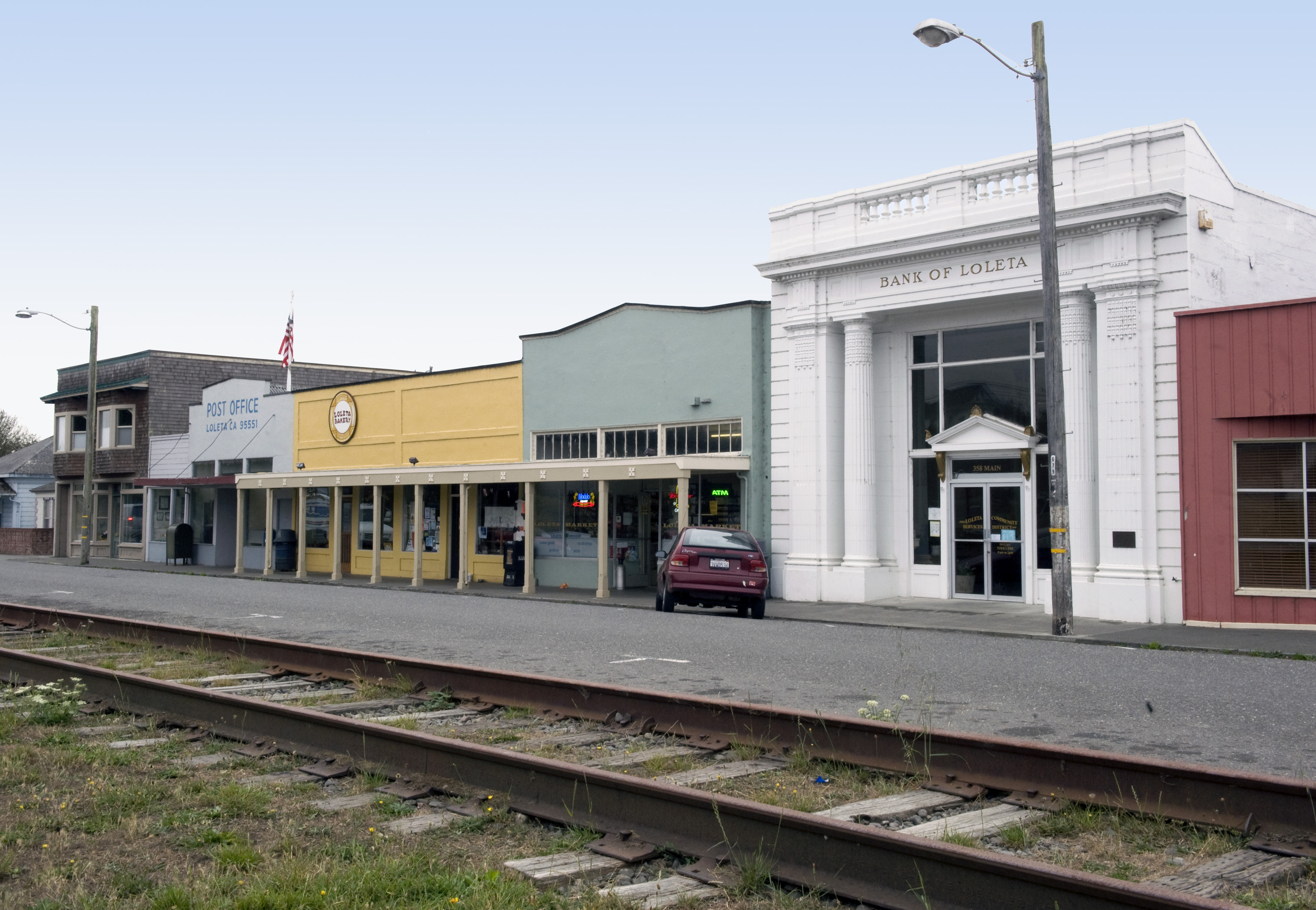
- Loleta's Main Street on south side of rail tracks

- Location of Loleta in Humboldt County, California.

- Location in California
- Coordinates: 40°38′27″N 124°13′31″W
- Country: United States
- State: California
- County: Humboldt

Area
  - Total: 2.124 sq mi (5.501 km^{2})
  - Land: 2.124 sq mi (5.501 km^{2})
  - Water: 0 sq mi (0 km^{2}) 0%
- Elevation: 46 ft (14 m)

Population (2020)
  - Total: 828
  - Density: 390/sq mi (151/km^{2})
- Time zone: UTC-8 (Pacific (PST))
  - Summer (DST): UTC-7 (PDT)
- ZIP Code: 95551
- Area code: 707
- GNIS feature IDs: 1656137; 2611440

Loleta (Wiyot: Guduwalhat) is an unincorporated community in Humboldt County, California, United States. Loleta is located 5.5 miles (9 km) south of Fields Landing, and 15 miles (24 km) south of Eureka at an elevation of 46 feet (14 m). The population was 828 at the 2020 census. For statistical purposes, the United States Census Bureau has defined Loleta as a census-designated place (CDP). Residents live in a central community area and rural outskirts. There are two separate Native American reservations on the rural outskirts of Table Bluff, California.

The ZIP Code is 95551, and the community is inside area code 707.

== History ==
European settlement began in the early 1850s although Wiyot people had inhabited the area for generations. Potato farming was the biggest agricultural use of land until the 1870s, when depleted soil and declining prices caused a turn to dairying. The town was originally known as Swauger or Swauger's Station, for local landowner Samuel A. Swauger.

The town was renamed Loleta in 1897. The name was reported to mean "pleasant place at the end of the tide water" in the language of the original Wiyot native inhabitants, although this is apparently contradicted linguistically as well as by a hearsay account from the 1950s, made notorious by a National Geographic blog post. However, a 1918 list of place names collected by Kroeber and Waterman two years after Kroeber's 1916 publication shows that the trail from Table Bluff along the peak of that feature was named "lalōekā".

The Eel River and Eureka Railroad reached Swauger's Station from Humboldt Bay in 1883. The Swauger post office opened in 1888, and changed its name to Loleta in 1898. The Humboldt Creamery plant (originally Diamond Springs Creamery, eventually a co-operative of the Golden State Creamery) opened in the town proper in 1893. Dairying continues to be a major economic influence. The Atchison, Topeka and Santa Fe Railway reorganized Loleta's railroad as the San Francisco and Northwestern Railway in 1903 and then completed the Northwestern Pacific Railroad to San Francisco in 1914.

== Environment ==
Located 1 mile (1.6 km) from the Eel River, which drains 10 percent of the total California watershed, and four miles from the Pacific Ocean and Humboldt Bay, fishing has also been a significant economic factor in the local economy. In the early years of the 20th century, fish buyers from San Francisco congregated in Loleta every autumn to bid on the salmon catch, which averaged $50,000.

There are two Humboldt County parks located near Loleta: Crab Park which is located on the estuary of the Eel River and Table Bluff County Park which is situated at the base of Table Bluff on the beach. To the north of Table Bluff County Park is BLM land and to the south is land managed by the California Department of Fish and Wildlife.

The Aleutian Cackling Goose (Branta hutchinsii leucopareia) has in recent years extended its spring staging area to Loleta. Flocks of over 400 individual birds may be seen in March.

== Demographics ==
Historical population
Census	Pop.	Note	%±
2010	783		—
2020	828		5.7%
U.S. Decennial Census; 1860–1870 1880-1890; 1900 1910 1920; 1930 1940 1950; 1960 1970 1980; 1990 2000 2010

Loleta appeared as a census designated place in the 2010 U.S. census.

The 2020 United States census reported that Loleta had a population of 828. The population density was 389.8 inhabitants per square mile (150.5/km^{2}). The racial makeup of Loleta was 630 (76.1%) White, 13 (1.6%) African American, 19 (2.3%) Native American, 10 (1.2%) Asian, 3 (0.4%) Pacific Islander, 76 (9.2%) from other races, and 77 (9.3%) from two or more races. Hispanic or Latino of any race were 151 persons (18.2%).

The whole population lived in households. There were 361 households, out of which 100 (27.7%) had children under the age of 18 living in them, 160 (44.3%) were married-couple households, 32 (8.9%) were cohabiting couple households, 89 (24.7%) had a female householder with no partner present, and 80 (22.2%) had a male householder with no partner present. 104 households (28.8%) were one person, and 35 (9.7%) were one person aged 65 or older. The average household size was 2.29. There were 220 families (60.9% of all households).

The age distribution was 173 people (20.9%) under the age of 18, 51 people (6.2%) aged 18 to 24, 220 people (26.6%) aged 25 to 44, 212 people (25.6%) aged 45 to 64, and 172 people (20.8%) who were 65 years of age or older. The median age was 41.5 years. For every 100 females, there were 90.8 males.

There were 376 housing units at an average density of 177.0 units per square mile (68.3 units/km^{2}), of which 361 (96.0%) were occupied. Of these, 176 (48.8%) were owner-occupied, and 185 (51.2%) were occupied by renters.

== Education ==
Loleta is the seat of the Loleta Union School District, and home of the Loleta Elementary School, a public K-8 school.

== Economy ==
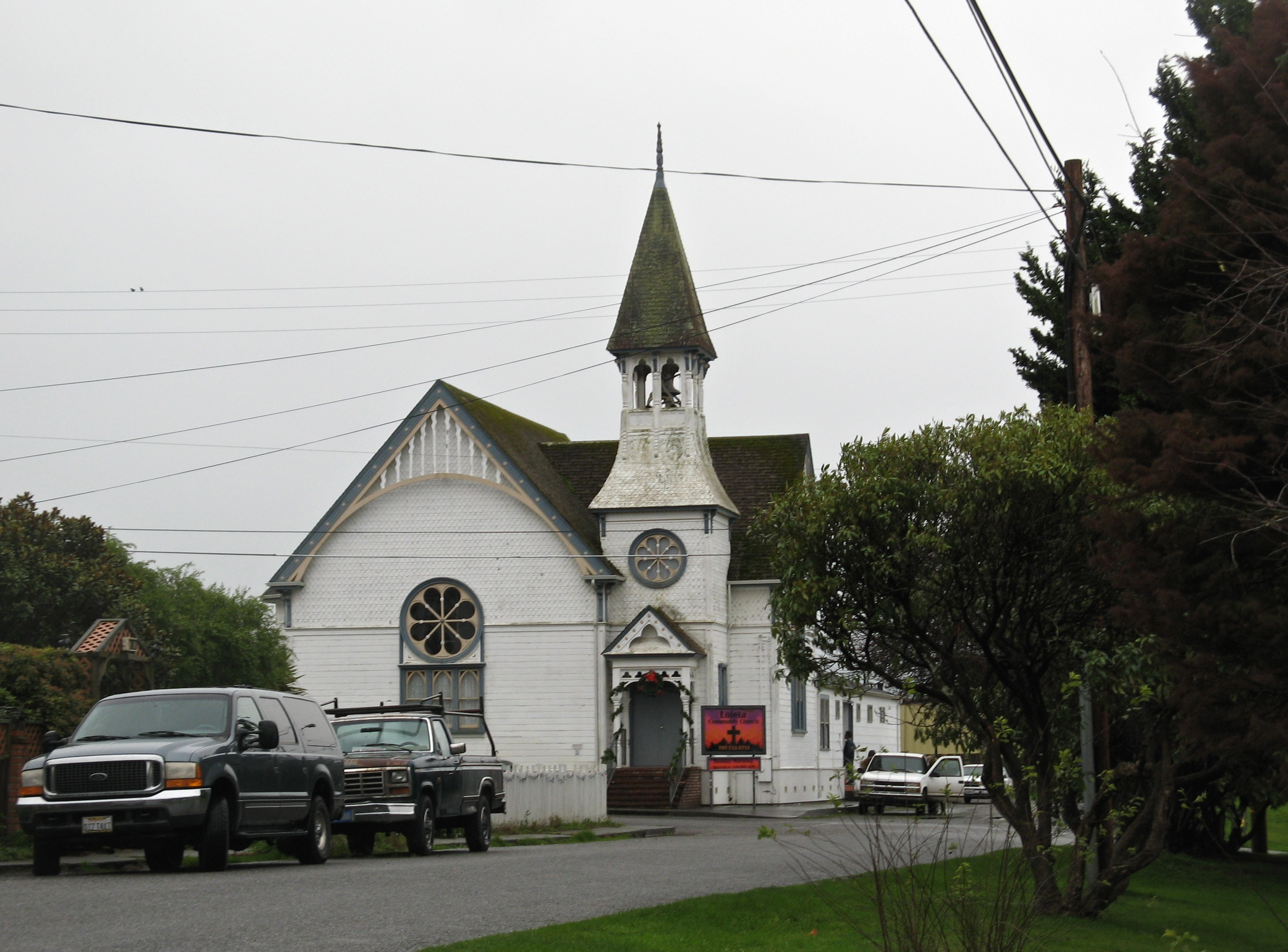
Loleta Community Evangelical Free Church, is one of the two churches in Loleta.

Although agriculture and dairy have been salient factors in Loleta's economy, most residents work outside the community in neighboring cities.

The Bear River Band of the Rohnerville Rancheria is headquartered in Loleta, where they operate the Bear River Casino.

The Loleta Elementary school, two churches and the firefighter's pavilion, managed by local volunteer firefighters, are close to U.S. 101.

== Popular culture ==
Loleta and Eureka were locations for filming the 1982 horror movie, Halloween III: Season of the Witch; scenes inside "the Silver Shamrock Novelties factory" were filmed in a former milk bottling plant for Familiar Foods on Loleta Drive at Railroad Avenue.

"Drive," Season 6, Episode 2 of the hit show The X-files, features Loleta momentarily near the end of the episode.

== Name ==
There is disagreement as to the origin of its name but was changed from Swauger Station to Loleta by the community in 1897. One story is that its derived name, lalōekā, is the Wiyot name for the trail on the top of Table Bluff, or possibly "The pleasant place by the water"

== Politics ==
In the state legislature, Loleta is in the 2nd senatorial district, represented by Democrat Mike McGuire, and the 2nd Assembly district, represented by Democrat Chris Rogers.

Federally, Loleta is in California's 2nd congressional district, represented by Democrat Jared Huffman.

== Notable people ==
- Seth Kinman, pioneer and hunter for Fort Humboldt
- Northwest school artist Morris Graves lived in Loleta from 1964 until his death in 2001, in a house designed by Seattle architect Ibsen Nelson.

== See also ==
- Humboldt Bay National Wildlife Refuge
- Humboldt Creamery
- Northwestern Pacific Railroad
