= Wiyot (disambiguation) =

The Wiyot are a Native American people of California.

Wiyot may also refer to:

- Wiyot language, extinct Algic language foremerly spoken by the Wiyot people
- Wiyot Tribe, a federally recognized Wiyot group
- Wiyot, or Weywot, a figure of Tongva mythology
