= Gospel Outreach (Humboldt) =

Defunct Christian church in California

Gospel Outreach was a Christian Church which emerged in Northern California in 1970 as part of the Jesus movement. Originally located at Table Bluff, in Humboldt County, California, 4.5 miles (7.2 km) south of Fields Landing, at an elevation of 318 feet (97 m) on a bluff adjacent to the Pacific Ocean, the local movement still exists with a school and Church in Eureka, California which was completed in 2009, as well as three churches located in Portland, Oregon, Olympia, Washington, and Tacoma, Washington.

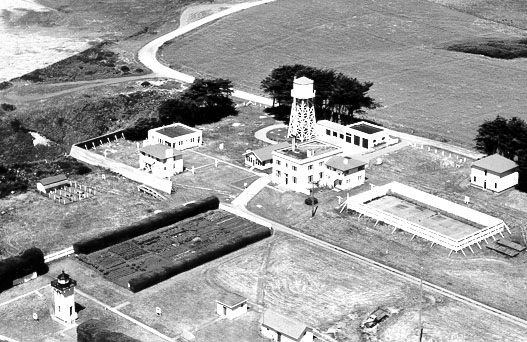
1951 view of Coast Guard Station that became "The Lighthouse Ranch" before most of buildings were razed, leaving the signal building. The Table Bluff Lighthouse (lower left) was moved to Eureka's Woodley Island Marina located in Humboldt Bay in 1987.

== Lighthouse Ranch ==
During the 1960s, members of the hippie counterculture sought a simple life; many were drawn to areas away from large cities and getting back to the land. The Lighthouse Ranch was an abandoned Coast Guard station occupying 8 acres (32,000 m2) of coastal land 11 miles south of Eureka, California. It was situated on the hippie trail that then extended along the west coast of California. The ranch was purchased by Norman Kenneth Smith, an evangelical minister, who converted it to a Christian commune. In 1971, Jim Durkin, a local pastor and real estate agent, formed Gospel Outreach to purchase the ranch from Ken Smith. It became a stopover for young adults seeking spiritual direction. Young travelers visited and many stayed, immersing themselves in Bible study, prayer and worship. They also attended services at Deliverance Temple, the church that Jim Durkin pastored in Eureka. They worked in the vegetable garden on the land, and at various other enterprises. In addition to the existing Coast Guard buildings, they built at least one alternative dwelling on the cliffside overlooking the ocean. Building plans were published in the Whole Earth Catalog as part of the Back-to-the-land movement.

== Church growth ==
By 1972, Gospel Outreach Lighthouse Ranch had grown to almost 300 members. In keeping with its name, Gospel Outreach began sending missionary teams throughout the world. Throughout the 1970s and 80's, the organization established churches in Palmer, Alaska; Chicago, Illinois; Brooklyn, New York; Silverton, Oregon; and Philadelphia, Pennsylvania. Teams were also sent to Germany, United Kingdom, Nicaragua, Brazil, and Hawaii. With 100 affiliated churches worldwide the Gospel Outreach network became one of the denominational legacies of the Jesus People Movement.

== Central message ==
In the 1970s Jim Durkin preached "God's Purpose And Vision" in sermons, books and television and radio broadcasts. God's purpose, according to Durkin, was to exalt Jesus Christ in all creation. And to accomplish this, He instilled in believers His vision--to preach the gospel throughout the world. Durkin also emphasized repentance, as in a need for a follower of Christ to experience a "turning away' from past wrongful behaviors. This concept was readily understood by young people who had recently identified themselves as hippies.

Durkin emphasized the importance of considering the needs of others first, and the personal growth of each individual. The name "Gospel Outreach" reflected the words of Jesus, "And he said unto them, Go ye into all the world, and preach the gospel (good news) to the whole creation."

== In literature ==
Three nonfiction books were written featuring the experiences of individuals involved with Lighthouse Ranch.
