= Daby Island =

Island in California

- Location within California Location within the United States

Geography
- Location: Northern California
- Coordinates: 40°48′40″N 124°09′07″W
- Highest elevation: 3 ft (0.9 m)

Administration
- United States
- State: California
- County: Humboldt
- City: Eureka

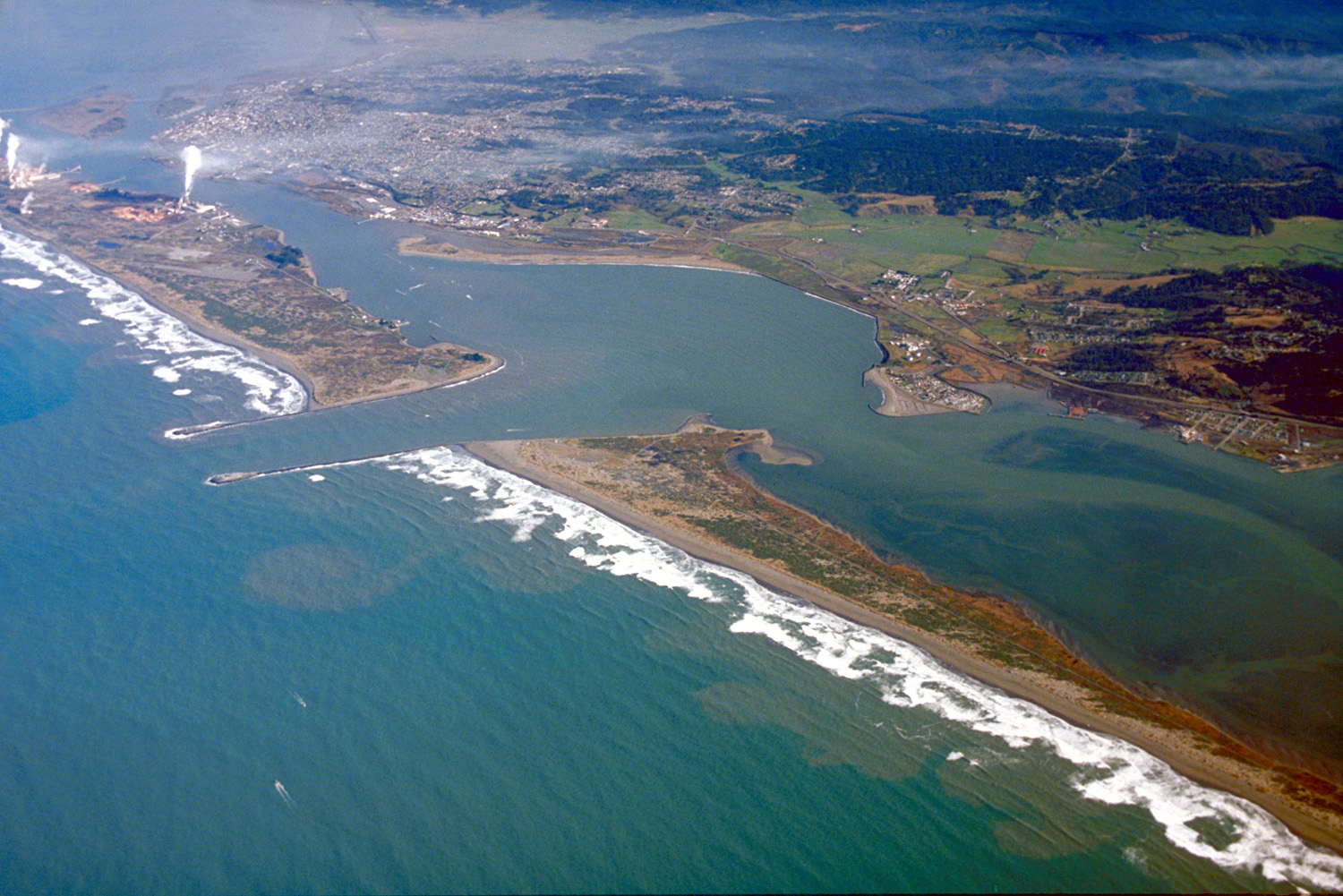
An aerial view of Humboldt Bay taken from the southwest. Daby Island can be seen in the top left, to the right of Tuluwat Island.

Daby Island is an island in Humboldt Bay in Humboldt County, California. Located east of Woodley Island, it is part of the city of Eureka and has an elevation of three feet.

There are 28 historic landmarks near the island.
