= Southport Landing =

Southport Landing may refer to:

- Southport Landing, California
- Southport, Maine
