= Table Bluff, California =

Coordinates: 40°39′29″N 124°12′59″W

Table Bluff is a locality in Humboldt County, California. It is located adjacent to the Pacific Ocean 4.5 miles (7.2 km) south of Fields Landing, at an elevation of 318 feet (97 m).

== History ==
The original hotel was built by pioneer Van Aerman in 1852.

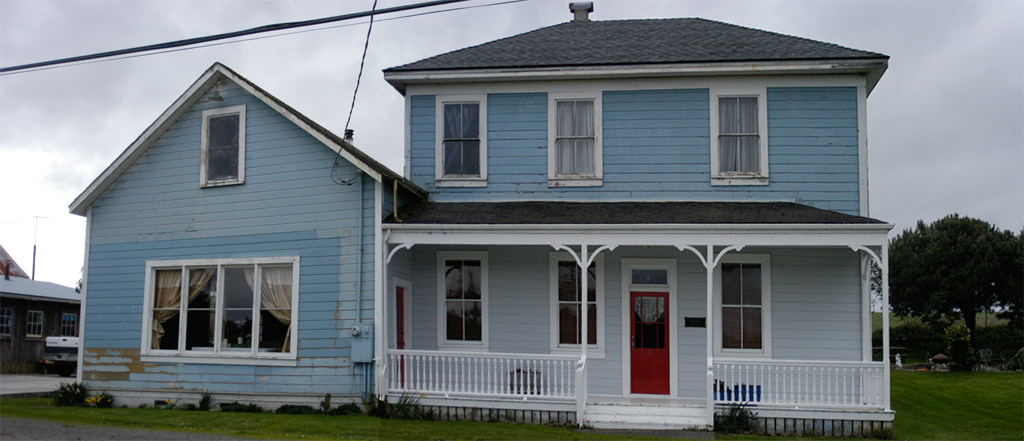
The historic Table Bluff Hotel

A post office operated at Table Bluff from 1861 to 1862, from 1867 to 1868, from 1870 to 1891, for a time in 1892, and from 1900 to 1901. From 1892 to 1975 the Table Bluff Light was located on Table Bluff. Table Bluff Rancheria of the Wiyot people is located on Table Bluff.

Gospel Outreach was a Christian community that was situated at Table Bluff on "Lighthouse Ranch" located on a former Coast Guard Station. From 1971 to the late 1980s many young people from the Jesus movement lived at the ranch.

== Notable residents ==
Seth Kinman ran the hotel/bar at Table Bluff for many years as well as owning a home there. He and his family are buried in the Table Bluff Cemetery.
