= Southport Landing, California =

Coordinates: 40°41′41″N 124°14′56″W

Southport Landing (formerly Myer's Landing and Myers Landing) is a locality in Humboldt County, California. It is located 2.5 miles (4 km) southwest of Fields Landing, at an elevation of 7 feet (2.1 m).

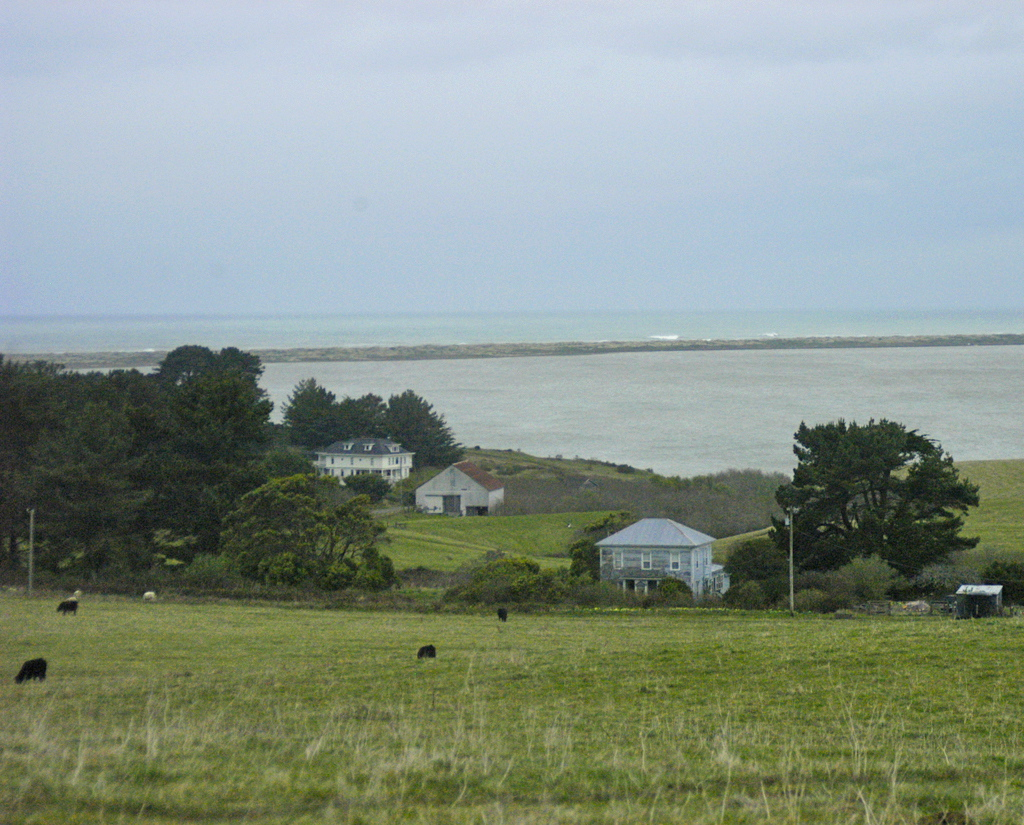
The Landing is at the end of the road where it meets the bay directly above Seth Kinman's blue house in the foreground.

The name "Myers" honors Jacob Myers, a prominent Humboldt Bay citizen in the 1850s. The large white home of the Heneys, a prosperous merchant family, and the home of Seth Kinman remain.

== Notable residents ==
Seth Kinman
