= Wiyot traditional narratives =

Wiyot traditional narratives include myths, legends, tales, and oral histories preserved by the Wiyot people of the Humboldt Bay area of northwestern California.

Wiyot oral literature shares elements with the distinctive Yurok-Karuk-Hupa area of northwestern California, as well as with the more widely distributed patterns of central California. (See also Traditional narratives (Native California).)

== On-Line Examples of Wiyot Narratives ==
- The North American Indian by Edward S. Curtis (1924)

== Sources for Wiyot Narratives ==
- Curtis, Edward S. 1907–1930. The North American Indian. 20 vols. Plimpton Press, Norwood, Massachusetts. (11 myths collected from Jerry James, vol. 13, pp. 190–198.)
- Gifford, Edward Winslow, and Gwendoline Harris Block. 1930. California Indian Nights. Arthur H. Clark, Glendale, California. (Three previously published narratives, pp. 83–84, 283–284, 296–297.)
- Kroeber, A. L. 1905. "Wishosk Myths". Journal of American Folklore 18:85–107. (Including comparative notes.)
- Kroeber, A. L. 1911. "The Languages of the Coast of California North of San Francisco". University of California Publications in American Archaeology and Ethnology 9:273–435. Berkeley. (Includes Wiyot myths, pp. 404–406.)
- Kroeber, A. L. 1925. Handbook of the Indians of California. Bureau of American Ethnology Bulletin No. 78. Washington, D.C. (Creation myth and comparisons, pp. 119–120.)
- Margolin, Malcolm. 1993. The Way We Lived: California Indian Stories, Songs, and Reminiscences. First edition 1981. Heyday Books, Berkeley, California. (Pleides myth, pp. 88, from Curtis 1907–1930.)
- Reichard, Gladys A. 1925. "Wiyot Grammar and Texts". University of California Publications in American Archaeology and Ethnology 22:1–215. Berkeley. (Recorded in 1922–1923.)
- Teeter, Karl V. 1964. The Wiyot Language. University of California Publications in Linguistics No. 37. Berkeley. (Narratives collected in 1956–1959.)
