= Loleta Union School District =

School district headquartered in Loleta, California

Address
- 700 Loleta Drive Loleta, California, 95551; United States

District information
- Type: Public
- Grades: K–8
- NCES District ID: 0622320

Students and staff
- Students: 97
- Teachers: 6.0 (FTE)
- Staff: 19.08 (FTE)
- Student–teacher ratio: 16.17

Other information
- Website: loletaschool.org

The Loleta Union School District, headquartered in Loleta, California, oversees public education, through grade 8, in a portion of coastal central Humboldt County, California. The school it operates is the Loleta Elementary School in Loleta.

The school board consists of five members:

- John Simmons
- John Oswald
- Roseann Millhorn
- Glen Shewry

The superintendent is Autumn Chapman.
