= Wiyot Tribe =

Coordinates: 40°41′02″N 124°14′44″W

Total population
- 600 enrolled members

Regions with significant populations
- United States (California)

Languages
- American English, formerly Wiyot

Religion
- Traditional tribal religions

Related ethnic groups
- Yurok, other Wiyot

The Wiyot Tribe is a federally recognized tribe of the Wiyot. They are the Indigenous people of Humboldt Bay, Mad River, and lower Eel River.

Other Wiyot are enrolled in the Blue Lake, Rohnerville and Trinidad Rancherias.

== Reservation ==
Location of Table Bluff Reservation

The Wiyot Tribe's land base includes two Reservations: the Table Bluff Reservation and the Old Table Bluff Reservation, which are located 16 mi (26 km) southwest of Eureka, California. The new Table Bluff Reservation is 88-acres. The Old Table Bluff Reservation was established in 1908, when a church donated 20 acres of land to the Wiyot Tribe. The land was allotted to individuals. The Reservation was formally recognized by the government in 1981 and 102 acres was purchased for the tribe. The Reservation is located on Table Bluff in Humboldt County, California. It lies at an elevation of 236 feet (72 m). The land is also known as the "Old Reservation" for the Wiyot. As of the 2010 Census the population was 103.

== Government ==
The Wiyot Tribe is headquartered in Loleta, California. The tribe is governed by a democratically elected, seven-member tribal council. The current tribal administration is as follows:

- Tribal Chair: Ted Hernandez
- Vice Chairperson: Brian Mead
- Secretary: Leona Wilkinson
- Treasurer: Linda Lange
- Councilperson: Kirsten Boyce
- Councilperson: Hazel James

== Language ==
English is commonly spoken by the tribe. The Wiyot language belongs to the California branch of the Algic languages. The language is written in the Latin script, and a dictionary and grammar has been published for Wiyot. The last fluent speaker of Wiyot died in 1962.

== History ==
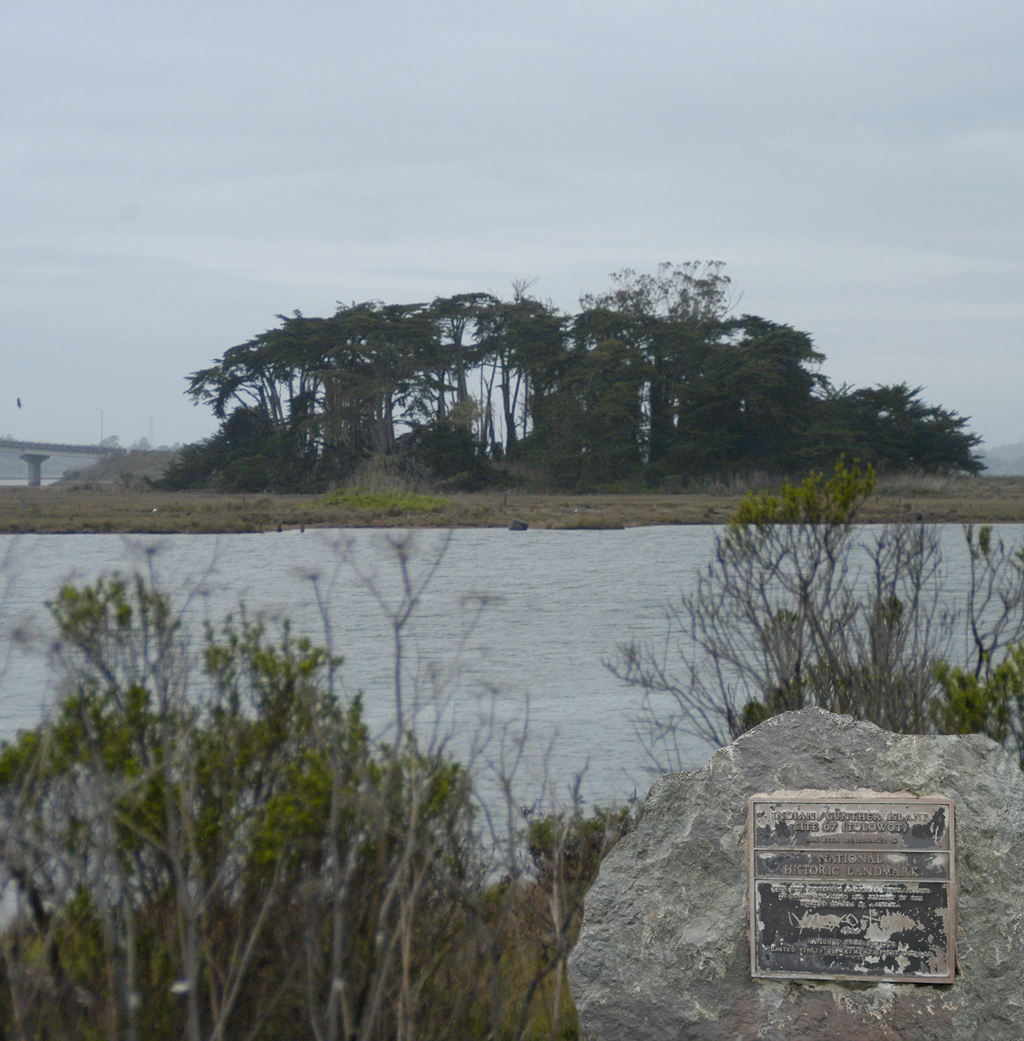
Tuluwat Island, California

Prior to European contact, Wiyot people numbered approximately 2,000. They first encountered Europeans in 1802. Non-native settlers overran Wiyot lands during the California Gold Rush that started in 1849. Wiyots were killed in the Rogue River Indian War in 1852.

On 26 February 1860, as the Wiyot people were celebrating their world renewal ceremony, European-American people ambushed Wiyot elders, women, and children in the (Wiyot Massacre, now known as the Indian Island Massacre) on what is now Tuluwat Island (previously Indian Island and Gunther Island).
