= Woodley Island =

Island in California

Woodley
- Location within California Location within the United States

Geography
- Location: Northern California
- Coordinates: 40°48′35″N 124°09′38″W
- Adjacent to: Humboldt Bay

Administration
- United States
- State: California
- County: Humboldt
- City: Eureka

Woodley Island is an island located in Humboldt Bay in the city of Eureka, California. The Table Bluff Lighthouse was moved to the island in 1987. There is also a marina on the island. The island is accessible by boat and car and is located across from downtown Eureka.
