= Tuluwat Island =

Archaeological site in California, United States

- Gunther Island Site 67
- U.S. National Register of Historic Places
- U.S. National Historic Landmark
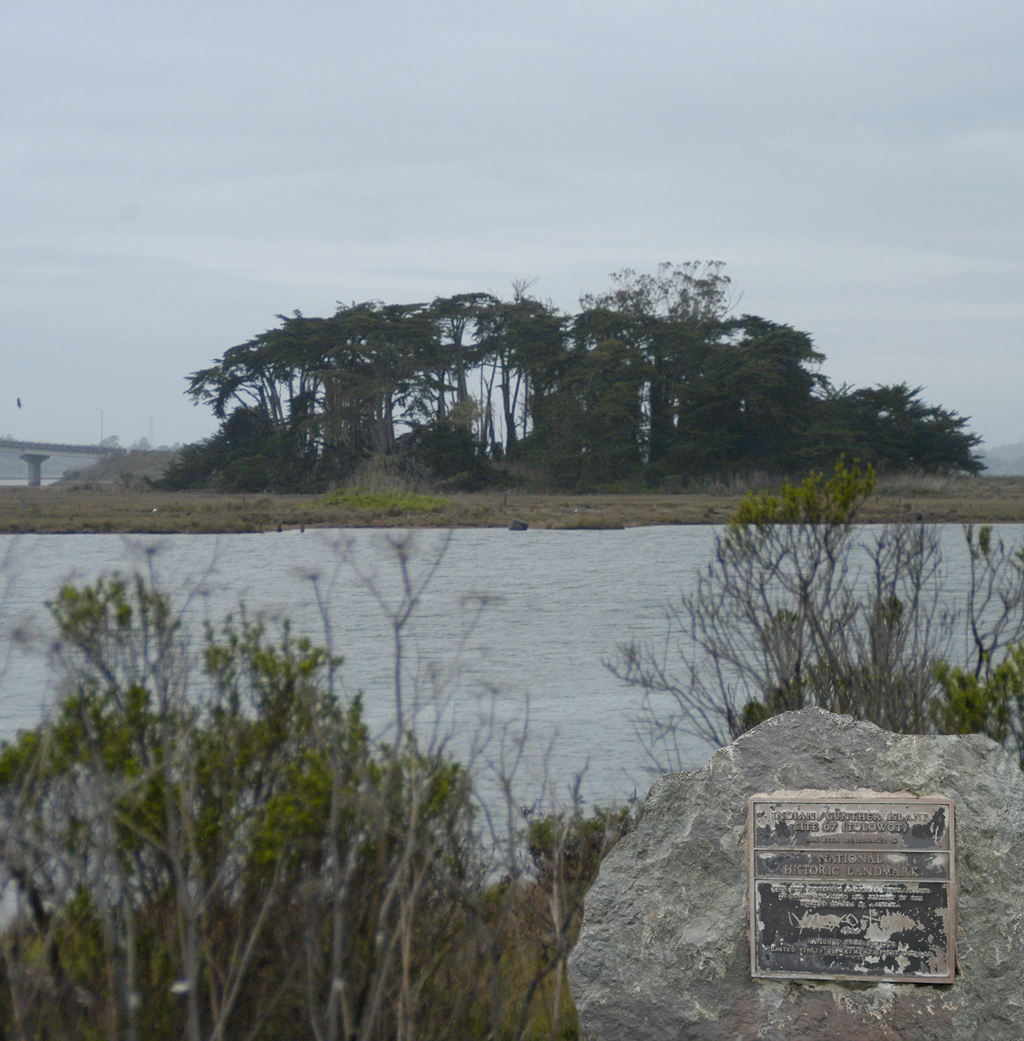
- National Register of Historic Places marker on Woodley Island in foreground, Tuluwat Island on other side of channel.

- Location within California Location within the United States
- Location: Address restricted
- Nearest city: Eureka, California
- Coordinates: 40°48′36″N 124°10′12″W
- Area: 280 acres (1,100,000 m^{2})
- NRHP reference No.: 66000208

Significant dates
- Added to NRHP: October 15, 1966
- Designated NHL: July 19, 1964

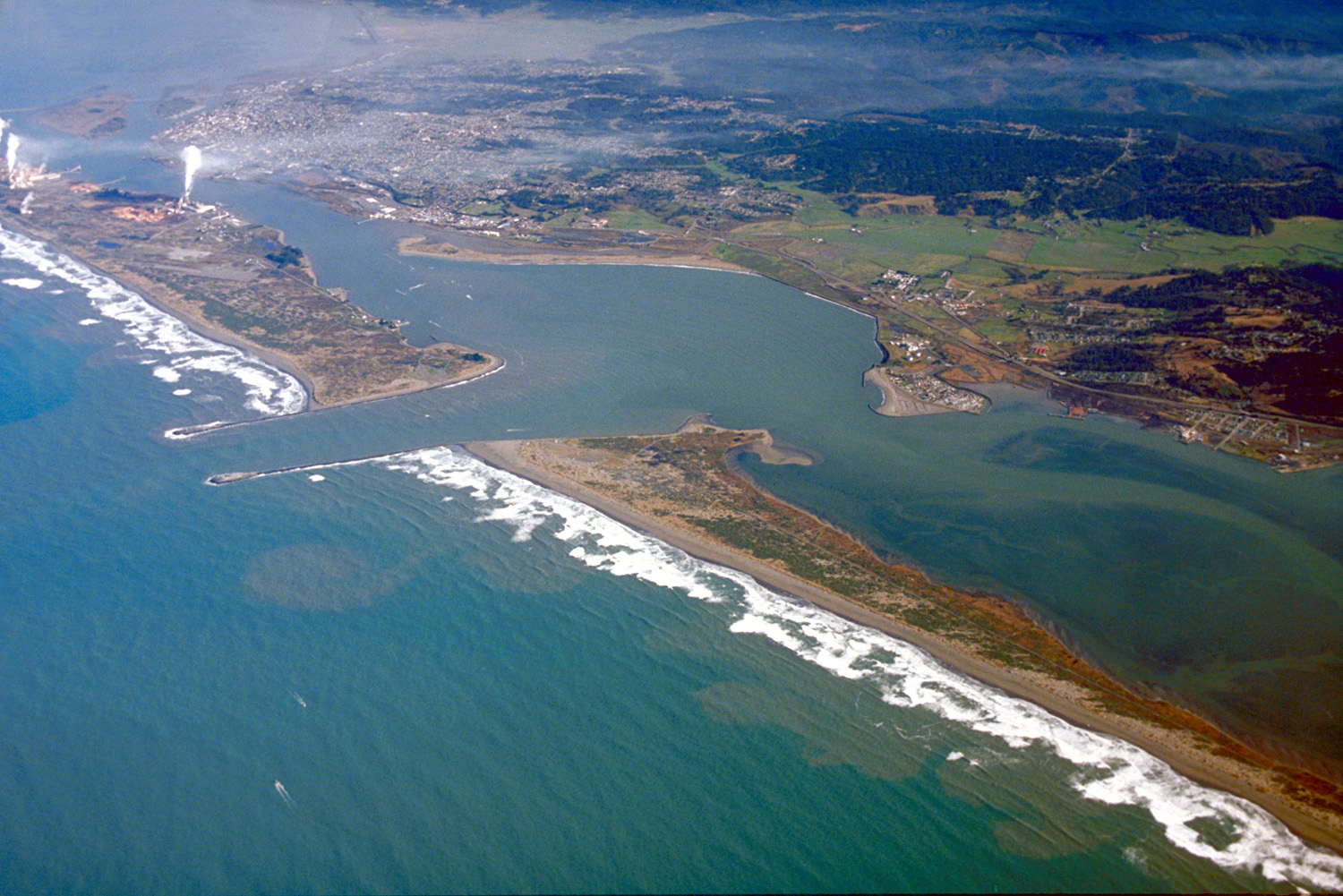
An aerial view of Humboldt Bay taken from the southwest. Tuluwat Island can be seen on the top left, next to Daby Island.

Tuluwat Island (formerly Indian Island or Gunther Island) is located on Humboldt Bay within the city of Eureka, California. The 1860 massacre of the Wiyot people was perpetrated in the village of Tolowot or Tuluwat on this island. A National Historic Landmark encompasses the midden at Gunther Island Site 67. Since October 21, 2019, the Wiyot Tribe have had the land deed to almost all of the island.

== Geography ==
Tuluwat Island is the largest of three islands located between the Samoa and Eureka Channels within Humboldt Bay and primarily consists of tidal marsh. Over time, human habitation on the island changed its topography, in part due to a process known as shell mounding, which increased the elevation of the island as Wiyot continually placed shells remaining from subsistence fishery management in the same location over a period of centuries.

The current island measures about 280 acres (110 ha), with about 40 acres (16 ha) to the north-east of California State Route 255 and the rest to the south-west.

== History ==
=== Early history ===
The indigenous Wiyot lived in Tolowot village on Duluwat Island long enough to alter the topography by the accumulation of shell fragments in middens, and the island became tall enough to be visible on the horizon from several miles away.

A non-degree student and employee of the University of California, Llewellyn Lemont Loud (1879–1946), conducted archaeological excavations of the island in 1918 that showed evidence of habitation since around 900 CE. The group of artifacts he excavated and described became known as the Gunther Pattern or Gunther Phase which encompasses the final phase of native dominance lasting until historic times and describes a style of Native American projectile points, grave goods and other archaeological remains which identify a second migration within California around 300 CE. The first major evidence of this came from Gunther Island Site 67 on Indian Island.

=== 1860 massacre ===
On February 26, 1860, about two hundred Wiyot people, mainly women and children, were massacred while most of the men were away during a World Renewal Ceremony. The massacre was carried out by European immigrants, who had settled in the area since 1850 as part of the California Gold Rush. There were few survivors.

=== European settlement ===
Robert Gunther acquired the island in 1860, three days before the massacre, giving it the name it had for much of recent history. Gunther diked the island and ran dairy cattle there for nearly 40 years.

In the 1870s a shipyard repair facility was constructed. The shipyard operated until the 1980s.

=== Modern era ===
In 1971 Caltrans built a series of bridges (known collectively as the Samoa Bridge), which cross Humboldt Bay and now directly connect the city of Eureka with the peninsula. Two of these bridges have footings on Tuluwat Island.

Every year since 1992, the Wiyot people and supporters come to the island on the last Saturday in February to heal the community, and remember the human lives lost at the time of the Massacre. Every year participation has increased at the vigil on a nearby island.

In 1998, the Wiyot people began fundraising to repurchase the island in order to be able to again dance the World Renewal ceremony on the island. The first purchase of 1.5 acres (0.61 ha) was made in 2000. In June 2004, the city of Eureka repatriated a further 67 acres (27 ha) to the Wiyot Tribe.

The city of Eureka and the Wiyot Tribe installed a temporary erosion control system to mitigate erosion on the site. Clean-up of contamination from the shipyard activities on the first site was certified complete in 2014.

On December 5, 2018, the Eureka City Council voted unanimously to return its remaining land on the island to the Wiyot people, deeding it to the Wiyot Tribe on October 21, 2019. Since that transfer, the Wiyot have owned all of the island except for a few privately owned parcels. Tuluwat Island's repatriation is believed to be the first time a U.S. municipality has returned land to an Indigenous community without strings attached.
