= Table Bluff (California) =

Terrace in Humboldt County, California

Coordinates: 40°39′29″N 124°12′59″W

Table Bluff (Wiyot: Giloulh) is a semi-flat terrace in Humboldt County, California, that terminates above the ocean in a dramatic, 165-foot (50 m) high cliff with views of the Eel River delta, the South Spit of Humboldt Bay, and the Pacific Ocean. It separates Humboldt Bay to the north from the Eel River to the south. It overlooks approximately 9,000 acres (36 km^{2}) of wildlands administered by various federal and county agencies. It is 12 miles (19 km) south of Eureka and 5.5 miles (8.9 km) west of US Highway 101. Table Bluff County Park provides access to the South Spit. The park is also used as a hang-gliding and paragliding staging area. The federally endangered western lily, Lilium occidentale, is found growing on Table Bluff at Table Bluff Ecological Reserve.

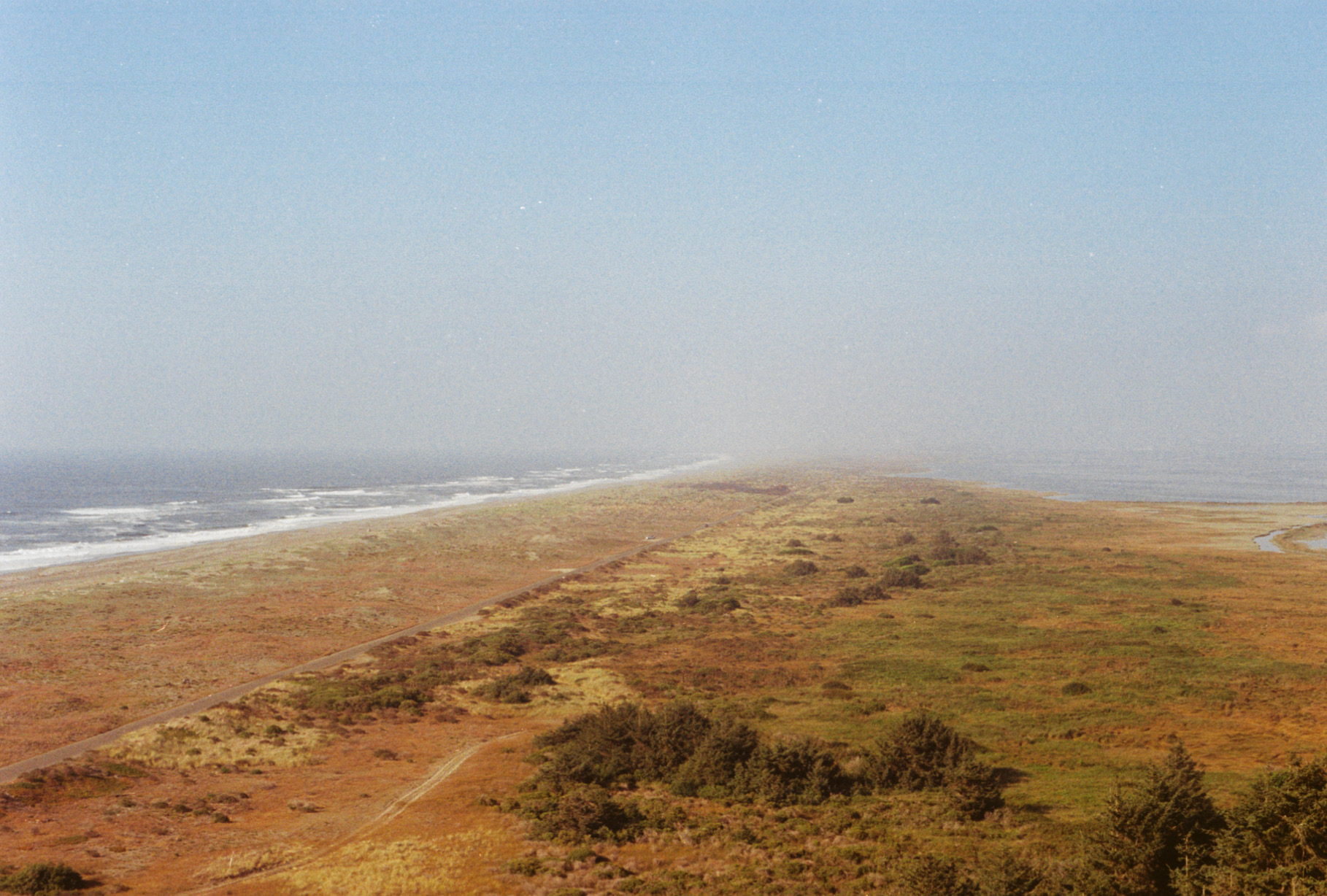

== History ==
Early explorers of the bay called the landform Ridge Point and Brannan Bluff, but by 1851 Table Bluff had stuck. Seth Kinman was an early resident. Because of its rich soil, Table Bluff has been the site of a small agricultural community since the 1850s. At present, hay fields and cattle ranches occupy most of the bluff.

A reservation of the native Wiyot tribe is also located here. Table Bluff Rancheria was established in 1908. It originally comprised 20 acres (81,000 m^{2}) donated by a local church. An additional 102 acres (0.4 km^{2}) were purchased for the tribe by the federal government in 1981 as the result of a lawsuit settlement.

In 1892, a lighthouse was built on the bluff to replace an older one on the North Spit. A fog horn and a Navy wireless telegraphy (later radio) station were in place by 1915 at what eventually became a Coast Guard facility at the point of the bluff. The lighthouse was abandoned in 1972 after automated beacons were installed at the Humboldt Bay entrance. Its entire tower was moved to Woodley Island, across from the Eureka waterfront, in 1987.

In 1970, the Coast Guard cited Seaman Robert Mark for "extraordinary heroism" while serving as crew of CG-44234, for rescuing the operator of the fishing vessel Alice, which sank just west of Table Bluff.

8 acres (32,000 m^{2}) of the surplus Coast Guard property were purchased by Norman Kenneth Smith, an evangelical minister, in 1970, and renamed Lighthouse Ranch, which was part of what became an international ministry known as Gospel Outreach. The "Ranch" became a half-way house for young adults seeking spiritual direction. This ministry later became Gospel Outreach of Eureka. The lighthouse is no longer staffed.

The California Coastal Conservancy began the process of acquiring 5.5 acres (22,000 m^{2}) of this property in 2005.
