= Fields Landing, California =

Fields Landing
- census-designated place
- Location of Fields Landing in Humboldt County, California.

- Location in California
- Coordinates: 40°43′28″N 124°12′54″W
- Country: United States
- State: California
- County: Humboldt

Area
  - Total: 0.280 sq mi (0.725 km^{2})
  - Land: 0.277 sq mi (0.717 km^{2})
  - Water: 0.0031 sq mi (0.008 km^{2}) 1.1%
- Elevation: 13 ft (4 m)

Population (2020)
  - Total: 287
  - Density: 1,040/sq mi (400/km^{2})
- Time zone: UTC-8 (Pacific (PST))
  - Summer (DST): UTC-7 (PDT)
- ZIP Code: 95537
- Area code: 707
- GNIS feature IDs: 1656012; 2628730

Fields Landing (formerly, South Bay, South Bay Station, and Adele) is a census-designated place in Humboldt County, California, United States. It is located on Humboldt Bay, 6 miles (9.7 km) south-southwest of downtown Eureka, at an elevation of 13 feet (4 m). The ZIP Code is 95537. The population was 287 at the 2020 census.

== History ==
Before the arrival of European settlers, the area now known as Humboldt County was occupied by a number of indigenous peoples, including the Wiyot, Yurok, Hupa, Karuk, Chilula, Whilkut, and the southern Athabascans. Fields Landing is located within the original territory of the Wiyot tribe.

The first recorded entrance into Humboldt Bay occurred in 1806 by members of a Russian-American company from Sitka. The Josiah Gregg party arrived by land in December 1849, and by 1850 the first ships came to the bay bringing men seeking gold. As the Gold Rush subsided, the economy shifted to the use of the surrounding natural resources, mainly timber, salmon, and agricultural land. The area was a prime exporter of agricultural products from 1857 to 1900.

Fields Landing was named for Waterman Field, a resident of Humboldt County since 1861. He established the town in 1862. Field owned 160 acres in what is currently known as Fields Landing. Waterman Field built a dock there to ship his farm products and the name "Fields Landing" was derived from this landing place for ships.

Fort Humboldt, built in 1853 to protect settlers from retaliatory attacks and keep peace between the settlers and the natives, was a failure, as the garrison did neither successfully. Indians were enslaved under the terms of the 1850 "Act for the Government and Protection of Indians" that provided legal basis for the continued Californio practice of capturing and using Native people as forced workers, particularly that of young women and children, which was carried on as a legal business enterprise. Intrusion of professional hunters and settlers and their herds of cattle and pigs into the hunting and gathering areas of the natives in the interior led the reduction of their food supplies and native resistance to this began the Bald Hills War. Development around the bay, disease, and the February 26, 1860 Indian Island Massacre, and consequences of the Bald Hills War, led to decimation of the peaceful Wiyot reducing their numbers from 3,000 to less than 100 survivors by 1865.

In the 1880s, docks were built in Fields Landing for shipping redwood and other timber. When the Northwestern Pacific Railroad was extended into the Humboldt Bay area in 1914, it functioned as a dike, and allowed the tidal marshes to be converted into agricultural lands. The construction of U.S. Route 101 in 1927 also created more fill, allowing most of the marshes to be drained and diked.

After World War II, a new Douglas fir and plywood industry brought in many out-of-state loggers and mill workers. From 1940 to 1951, a whaling station operated in Fields Landing. However, the timber industry continued to dominate life in the community into the 1970s. The demise of the timber industry in the 1980s forced a fresh perspective on resource use. New groups of people began to arrive, namely Hispanic workers and families, and refugees from the Vietnam War.

== Demographics ==
Historical population
Census	Pop.	Note	%±
2010	276		—
2020	287		4.0%
U.S. Decennial Census; 1860–1870 1880-1890; 1900 1910 1920; 1930 1940 1950; 1960 1970 1980; 1990 2000 2010

Fields Landing first appeared as a census designated place in the 2010 U.S. census.

=== 2020 ===
The 2020 United States census reported that Fields Landing had a population of 287. The population density was 1,036.1 inhabitants per square mile (400.0/km^{2}). The racial makeup of Fields Landing was 192 (66.9%) White, 3 (1.0%) African American, 16 (5.6%) Native American, 7 (2.4%) Asian, 0 (0.0%) Pacific Islander, 14 (4.9%) from other races, and 55 (19.2%) from two or more races. Hispanic or Latino of any race were 47 persons (16.4%).

The whole population lived in households. There were 139 households, out of which 19 (13.7%) had children under the age of 18 living in them, 40 (28.8%) were married-couple households, 15 (10.8%) were cohabiting couple households, 47 (33.8%) had a female householder with no partner present, and 37 (26.6%) had a male householder with no partner present. 57 households (41.0%) were one person, and 23 (16.5%) were one person aged 65 or older. The average household size was 2.06. There were 63 families (45.3% of all households).

The age distribution was 60 people (20.9%) under the age of 18, 27 people (9.4%) aged 18 to 24, 87 people (30.3%) aged 25 to 44, 72 people (25.1%) aged 45 to 64, and 41 people (14.3%) who were 65 years of age or older. The median age was 35.7 years. For every 100 females, there were 114.2 males.

There were 139 housing units at an average density of 501.8 units per square mile (193.7 units/km^{2}), of which 139 (100.0%) were occupied. Of these, 75 (54.0%) were owner-occupied, and 64 (46.0%) were occupied by renters.

== Economy ==
The economic base of Fields Landing was founded on fishing and timber. The commercial fishing industry experienced a steep decline in recent years, and in 2013 the major industries are tourism and timber.

Fields Landing is located within the Port of Humboldt Bay Harbor, Recreation and Conservation District and the Port of Humboldt. Two shipping terminals are based in Fields Landing. Humboldt Bay Forest Products docks include one berth with a 600 feet (180 m) wooden dock with two approach ramps. Fields Landing Terminal includes one berth with a 900 feet (270 m) dock. A public boat ramp provides boating access for smaller craft.

=== Commercial fishing ===
In 2000, of the 42 vessels that delivered to Fields Landing all were commercially registered. There was at least one seafood processing plant located here in 2000, whose shipments included $182,000 worth of crab and over $1.5 million worth of groundfish.

Fields Landing residents owned eight vessels in 2000, all of which participated in the federally managed groundfish fishery. Seven federally managed groundfish fishery permits were held by three Fields Landing residents in 2000.

=== Statistics ===
The 2024 U.S. Census data indicates that 0% of the employed civilian population (532 persons in the Fields Landing CDP) 16 years and over worked in the agriculture, forestry, fishing, and hunting industries. A total of 0% worked in arts, entertainment, recreation, and accommodation and food services. Additionally, 53% worked in educational, health, and social services, while 36.7% were employed by the government. The 2024 U.S. Census states that there were 109 persons listed as unemployed, and 193 not in active labor force, but not listed as unemployment figures For the population 16 years and older, 41.9% were not in the labor force, while 40% were employed.

Also, according to the 2024 U.S. Census (DP03 data), in 2024 the median household income was $78,686 and the mean was $73,777 with a margin of error of +/- 14,574. About 24.5% of the population was living below poverty level in 1999. That number has changed only slightly through 2024. Of the 95 housing units in 2000, 89.5% were occupied and 10.5% were vacant. Of the occupied housing units, 40% were owner occupied, while 60% were renter occupied.

== Government ==
In the state legislature, Field's Landing is in the 2nd senatorial district, represented by Democrat Mike McGuire, and the 2nd Assembly district, represented by Democrat Chris Rogers.

Federally, Field's Landing is in California's 2nd congressional district, represented by Democrat Jared Huffman.

== Infrastructure ==
Fields Landing is accessible by a number of transportation options. Amtrak, and Redwood Transit, provide bus service respectively from nearby communities to greater metropolitan areas throughout the country. There is no current railroad connection, however that connection to points south of the region are provided by Amtrack bus service. The major highway that intersects Fields Landing is U.S. Highway 101. Despite common misconceptions to the contrary, it is the only roadway into Fields Landing.

== Education ==
Students attend local elementary, middle, and high schools in the nearby community of Eureka and closer schools such as South Bay and Pine Hill Elementary schools. Although the College of the Redwoods main campus is technically inside Eureka City Limits, Fields Landing is the nearest community to the college by road. Electricity is provided to community residents by Pacific Gas and Electric. Water and sewer services are supplied by Humboldt Community Services District. The Humboldt County Sheriff Department provides local law enforcement. The closest healthcare facility, St. Joseph Hospital, is located nearby in Eureka. Fields Landing accommodations include one motel. However, additional lodging is available in nearby communities and some rentals via AirBnB and Vrbo.

== See also ==
- Northwestern Pacific Railroad
