= Table Bluff Light =

Lighthouse in California, United States

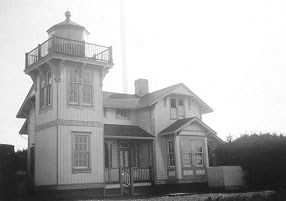
- U.S. Coast Guard Archive
- Location: Table Buff; California; United States
- Coordinates: 40°41′45.02″N 124°16′26.16″W

Tower
- Constructed: 1892
- Construction: wooden tower
- Automated: 1953
- Height: 35 ft (11 m)
- Shape: square tower attached to dwelling
- Markings: white tower, black lantern and trim
- Operator: Humboldt Bay Harbor, Recreation and Conservation District

Light
- Deactivated: 1971
- Focal height: 14 m (46 ft)
- Lens: Fourth order Fresnel lens (on display at the Humboldt Bay Maritime Museum)

Table Bluff Light is a lighthouse in California, United States, which was located on Table Bluff just south of Humboldt Bay. Built to guide vessels away from the notoriously dangerous and rough coastline and to let them know proximity of the nearby bay and entrance, the lighthouse was one of the first to be automated. The lighthouse tower portion is now located at the Woodley Island Marina within the City of Eureka.

== History ==
Table Bluff Lighthouse was built in 1892. A fixed, fourth-order Fresnel lens was removed from the Humboldt Harbor Light and installed in the 35-foot (11 m) tower at Table Bluff in late October 1892. In 1911, the fixed Fresnel lens was replaced with a revolving one. A modern optic was installed in the tower, and the Fresnel lens was shipped to San Diego to be displayed in the Old Point Loma Light. The lighthouse was deactivated in 1975.

The Humboldt Harbor Light located on the north spit of the Humboldt Bay Bar entrance had for many years been criticized as being too low. In 1892 the Lighthouse Service constructed a light station on Table Bluff, a promontory south of Humboldt Bay, but within-view of the bay. The original station consisted of a duplex Victorian quarters, fog-signal building, and a keepers quarters with light tower attached. The quarters were redwood Italianette–Stick Victorian, and the keepers quarters/light tower were almost exactly the same as San Luis Obispo Light. There were also two wash houses, an oil house and a carpenter shop. In 1906 the Navy established a radio station on the property and during World War II the station was expanded to include lodging for mounted beach patrols, a coastal lookout post, and a radio compass station. During the war and immediately afterwards most of the original buildings were razed along with some of the newer structures. The quarters portion of the lighthouse was razed leaving only the tower. This and the fog signal building were all that remained of the original buildings.

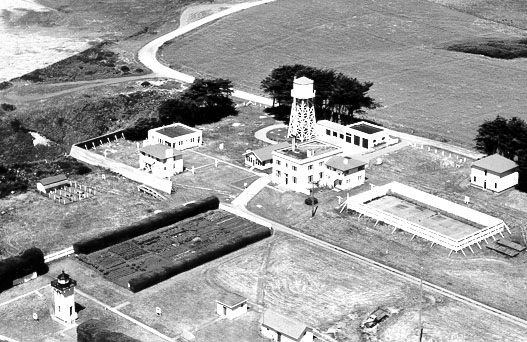
USCG photo shows lighthouse complex. Note lighthouse on lower left corner of photo. Circa 1951

In 1953 the rotating 4th order lens was removed and a fixed 3½ order lens installed. The 4th order optic was shipped to the Point Loma Light in San Diego which is operated as a museum by the National Park Service. The fog signal was discontinued the same year and the station automated. In 1975 the light was discontinued and the property transferred to the US government General Services Administration and sold. The 2½ order lens was shipped to the Smithsonian.

The lighthouse tower was cut in two and moved to Woodley Island Marina in Eureka, California, (40.808140°N 124.165411°W) in 1987. The lens in it now is not the original.

== See also ==
- List of lighthouses in the United States
