= 1860 Wiyot massacre =

Attacks near California, US

Coordinates: 40.815°N 124.161°W

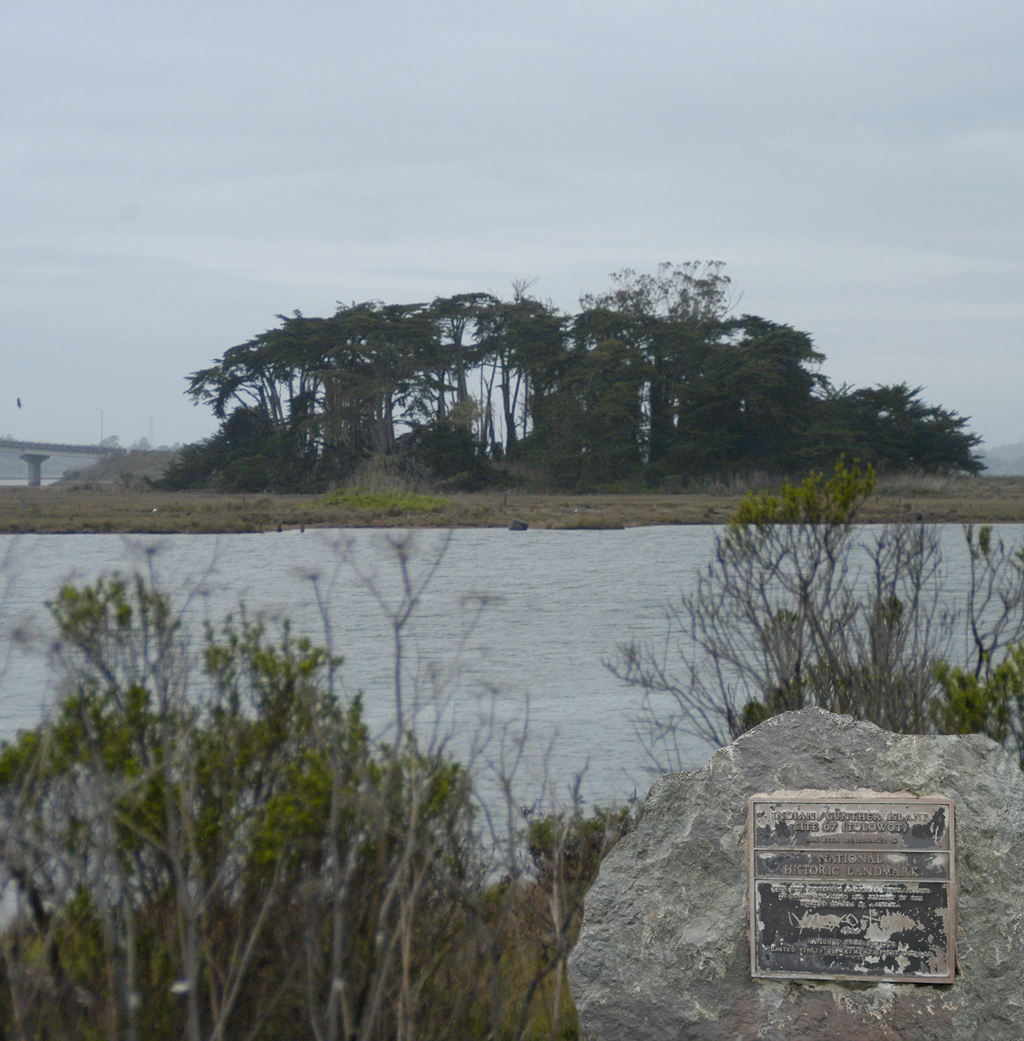
Tuluwat Island, site of the massacre

The Wiyot massacre refers to the atrocities on February 26, 1860, at Tuluwat (also known as Indian Island), near Eureka in Humboldt County, California. In coordinated attacks beginning at about 6 am, white settlers murdered 80 to 250 Wiyot people, mostly women and children, with axes, knives, and guns. The attack formed part of the broader California Genocide of Native Americans; similar bloody attacks on other Wiyot villages took place on the same day and later in the week.

== Background ==
Immigrants had settled in the area since the California Gold Rush, during the 10 years prior to the massacre. The Wiyot were at this time a peaceful tribe. They had never fought with white settlers and were not expecting an attack. The killings followed two years of hostility by a group of local whites against the residents of Indian Island, numerous editorials in the local newspapers, and the formation of volunteer militia groups. Settlers let their cattle stray onto Indian lands; Indians used the cattle, and the cattle owners accused them of rustling and retaliated.

At the time of the attack in late February, the Wiyots were preparing for their annual World Renewal Ceremony, which was held on the island and lasted seven to ten days. Traditionally, people gathered on the island but adult able-bodied men left at night to gather supplies for the ceremony while women, children, and older men slept.

== Massacre ==
On the night of February 26, 1860, a small group of settlers crossed Humboldt Bay and attacked the village, which was defenseless because almost all the able-bodied men were away. To avoid drawing attention from nearby Eureka residents, many of whom may not have condoned the killings, they used primarily handheld weapons: hatchets, clubs, and knives. Some Eureka residents reported hearing gunshots that night, but knowledge of the attack was not widespread at the time. News accounts report only adult men being shot. Arcata's local newspaper, the Northern Californian, described the scene as follows:

Blood stood in pools on all sides; the walls of the huts were stained and the grass colored red. Lying around were dead bodies of both sexes and all ages from the old man to the infant at the breast. Some had their heads split in twain by axes, others beaten into jelly with clubs, others pierced or cut to pieces with bowie knives. Some struck down as they mired; others had almost reached the water when overtaken and butchered.

Based on Wiyot Tribe estimates, 80 to 250 Wiyot people were murdered. Another estimate is that 150 were killed.

== Survivors ==
There were few survivors. One woman, Jane Sam, survived by hiding in a trash pile. Two cousins, Matilda and Nancy Spear, hid with their three children on the west side of the island and later found seven other children still alive. A young boy, Jerry James, was found alive in his dead mother's arms. Polly Steve was wounded badly and left for dead, but recovered. One of the few Wiyot men on the island during the attack, Mad River Billy, jumped into the bay and swam to safety in Eureka. Kaiquaish (also known as Josephine Beach) and her eleven-month-old son William survived because although she had set out for the island in a canoe to participate in the ceremonies, she became lost in the fog and returned home.

== Coordinated attacks ==
The massacre was part of a coordinated simultaneous attack that targeted other nearby Wiyot sites, including an encampment on the Eel River. The same day the same party was reported to have killed 58 more people at South Beach, about 1 mile (1.6 km) south of Eureka, even though many of the women worked for the white families and many could speak "good English". Two days after the Tuluwat massacre, on February 28, 40 more Wiyot were killed on the South Fork of the Eel River, and a few days later 35 more were killed at Eagle Prairie.

== Media reaction ==
Bret Harte wrote an editorial in The Northern California in Union (now Arcata, California) condemning the massacre; soon after, he had to leave the area because of threats against his life by the genocide sympathizers. In the editorial, Harte wrote:

[A] more shocking and revolting spectacle was never exhibited to the eyes of a Christian and civilized people. Old women, wrinkled and decrepit, lay weltering in blood, their brains dashed out and dabbled with their long gray hair. Infants scarce a span long, with their faces cloven with hatchets and their bodies ghastly with wounds."

Several prominent local citizens also wrote letters to the San Francisco papers angrily condemning the attacks and naming suspected conspirators.

== Investigation ==
The local sheriff, Barrant Van Ness, stated in a newspaper editorial published in the San Francisco Bulletin a few days after the massacre that the motive was revenge for cattle rustling. Ranchers in the inland valleys claimed as much as one-eighth of their cattle had been stolen or slaughtered by Indians over the previous year and one rancher, James C. Ellison, was killed while pursuing suspected rustlers in May 1859. The area where the ranches were located was occupied by the Nongatl tribe, not the Wiyot, so the victims of the massacre would not have been responsible for any rustling. Van Ness ended his written statement by saying he did not excuse the killers for their deeds.

Major Gabriel J. Rains, Commanding Officer of Fort Humboldt at the time, reported to his commanding officer that a local group of vigilantes had resolved to "kill every peaceable Indian - man, woman, and child". The vigilantes, calling themselves the Humboldt Volunteers, Second Brigade, had been formed in early February 1860 in the inland town of Hydesville, one of the ranching communities in the Nongatl area. They spent most of February "in the field" attacking Indians along the Eel River. A petition had been sent to California Governor John G. Downey asking that the Humboldt Volunteers be mustered into service and given regular pay. Downey refused the petition, stating that the U.S. Army was sending an additional Company of Regulars to Fort Humboldt.

Subsequent communications to Governor Downey show that the volunteer company commanded by Seman Wright wanted to become officially recognized as state militia, thereby becoming eligible for state funding. Hydesville rancher E. L. Davis, who had presided at the meeting where the company was formed, wrote Downey just after the massacre, stating that "This company is needed for the protection of lives & property & if we do not get it we will never ask the state again & I for one shall oppose paying any more state Taxes & [we will] fight our own battles in our own way-- exterminate the Indians from the face of the earth as far as this county is concerned. In fact, the little mess at Indian Island is only a beginning if we can't get our just protection from [the] state or [federal] government that the citizens are entitled to."

Despite condemnation of the attack in the press outside Humboldt County, no one was ever prosecuted for the murders.

== Aftermath and present day ==
The Wiyot Tribe said their people were not allowed to return to Tuluwat or their other lands. Soldiers from Fort Humboldt took many of the surviving Wiyot into protective custody at the fort, later transporting them to the Klamath River Reservation. Several nonetheless returned home soon after, and attacks on white settlements were stronger in areas with sparse settlement of white people.

White settler Robert Gunther gained ownership over the island in 1860, the year of the massacre. He diked the island and used it as a dairy ranch. It was later used as a shipyard repair facility, which led to toxic chemicals contaminating the island.

In 1998, the Wiyot Tribe began raising funds to repurchase the land in order to perform their annual World Renewal Ceremony. They bought the first parcel in 2000. They remediated the land, and in 2018 the Eureka City Council voted to return all the city's remaining holdings on the island to the tribe free of charge. The Wiyot Tribe now controls all but a few privately owned parcels, and resumed the World Renewal Ceremony on Tuluwat in 2014.

== In popular culture ==
The massacre of the Wiyot people is referenced by the American alternative rock band Frank Black and the Catholics in the song "Humboldt County Massacre" on their 1998 EP All My Ghosts. The song discusses the suffering of the Wiyot people, the reaction of Robert Gunther, and the lack of punishment for the perpetrators of the massacre.

== See also ==
- Henry P. Larrabee
- List of Indian massacres
