= Wiyot =

Indigenous people of California

Ku'wil
- Map of Wiyot villages and dialects

Total population
- 450

Regions with significant populations
- United States (California)

Languages
- English, historically Wiyot

Religion
- Christianity, Native American Church, Wiyot religion

Related ethnic groups
- Yurok

The Wiyot (Note: Wiyot: Wíyot; Tolowa: Wee-'at xee-she / Wee-yan' Xee-she'; Tututni: Wii-yat-dv-ne, lit. 'Mad River People'; Yurok: Weyet) are an Indigenous people of California living near Humboldt Bay, California, and a small surrounding area. They are culturally similar to the Yurok people (Hiktok). They simply called themselves the Ku'wil, meaning 'the People'. Today, there are approximately 450 Wiyot people. They are enrolled in several federally recognized tribes, such as the Wiyot Tribe (also known as the Table Bluff Reservation—Wiyot Tribe), Bear River Band of the Rohnerville Rancheria, Blue Lake Rancheria, and the Cher-Ae Heights Indian Community of the Trinidad Rancheria.

== History ==
The Wiyot and Yurok are the westernmost people to speak an Algic language. Their languages, Wiyot and Yurok, are distantly related to the Algonquian languages. The Wiyot people's traditional homeland ranged from Mad River (potawot) through Humboldt Bay (including the present cities of Eureka and Arcata) to the lower Eel River basin. Inland, their territory was heavily forested in ancient redwood. Their stretch of shoreland was mostly sandy, composed of dunes and tidal marsh. They recognized three divisions based on dialect and geography (from north to south):

- the Patawat Wiyot, Batawat Wiyot, Mad River Wiyot about Mad River (potawot)
- the Wiki Wiyot, Humboldt Bay Wiyot or Wikigadakwi' ('poor folks') about Humboldt Bay (wiki)
- the Wiyat Wiyot or Eel River Wiyot about Eel River delta (wiyat)

The Wiyots were among the last Indigenous people in California to encounter white settlers. Spanish missions extended only as far north as San Francisco Bay. Russian fur traders in search of sea otter arrived in 1806 but were driven out. During the Gold Rush the Josiah Gregg party came upon Humboldt Bay and skirted the shore. Ships set out to explore northern California's unknown coast. The schooner Laura Virginia located the bay, and in April 1850 made its way in through the dangerous entrance. At the same time pioneers were arriving by land to establish the area's towns. The way of life of the Wiyot people, after many centuries of isolated development, was disrupted by the settlement of Europeans.

Fort Humboldt was established on January 30, 1853, by the Army as a buffer between Native Americans, gold-seekers and settlers under the command of Brevet Lieutenant Colonel Robert C. Buchanan of the U.S. 4th Infantry Regiment. Among the miners, farmers, ranchers and loggers pouring into California, many settled at what is now Eureka. Relationships between the Wiyot and the white colonizers became hostile, marked by raids and vigilante justice.

=== Massacre ===
On February 26, 1860, the Wiyot experienced a massacre which devastated their numbers and has remained a pervasive part of their cultural heritage and identity.

Three days before the massacre, on Washington's birthday, a logging mill engineer from Germany named Robert Gunther bought property on "Indian Island".

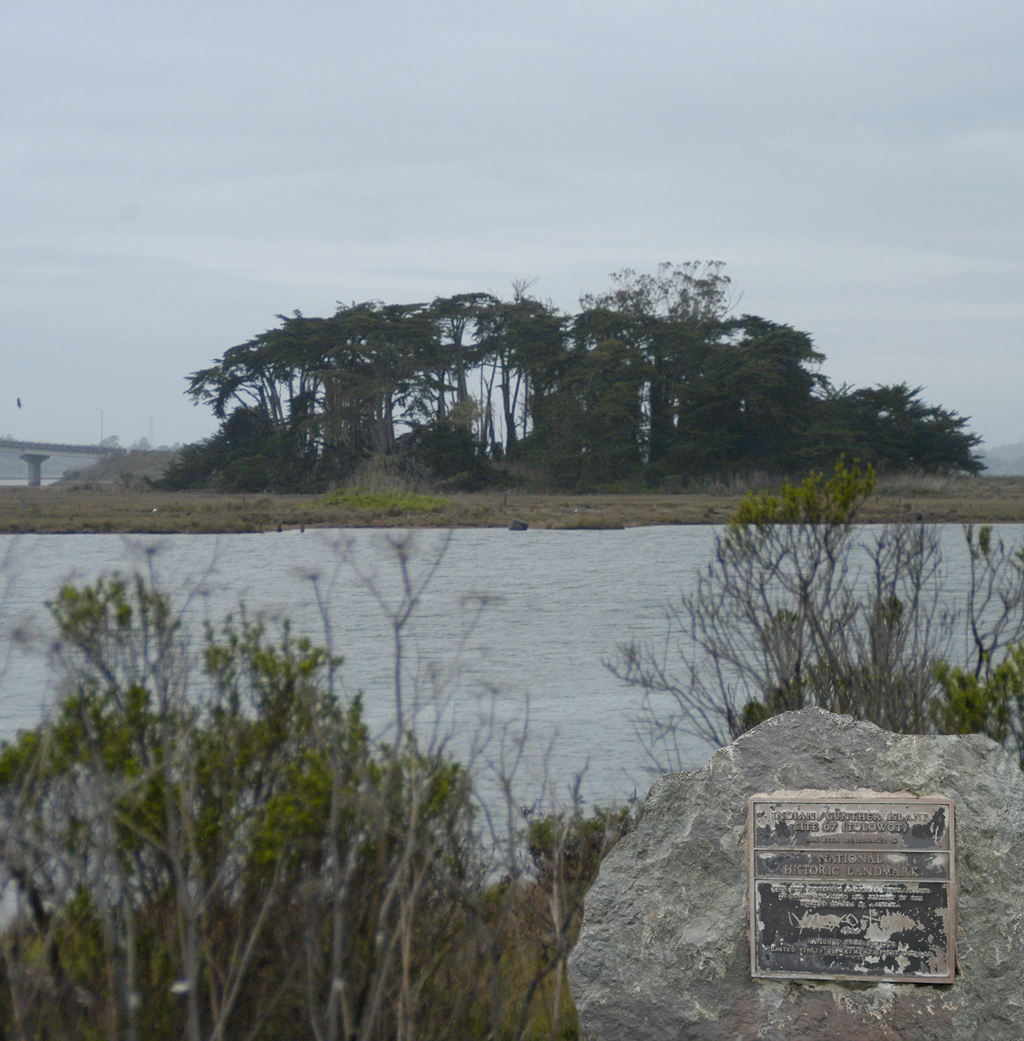
Indian Island. View North from Woodley Island Marina at end of Startare Drive showing National Register Marker with Indian Island shell midden on other side of channel.

The day before the massacre, 25 February, the Weekly Humboldt Times editorialized: "The Indians are still killing stock of the settlers in the back country and will continue to do so until they are driven from that section, or exterminated"; meanwhile prominent local residents had already formed a vigilante committee to deal with the problem, and were sworn to never reveal their membership.

For several days before the massacre, World Renewal ceremonies were being held at the village of Tuluwat, on Indian Island less than a mile offshore from Eureka in Humboldt Bay. Up to 250 Wiyot participated in the ceremonies. The leader of the Humboldt Bay Wiyots was Captain Jim. He organized and led the ceremony to start a new year.

A group of white men came to the island in the early morning after the last ceremony was completed and most of the Indian men had left the island, leaving only women and children. The whites were armed with hatchets, clubs and knives and had left their guns behind so the noise of the slaughter would be only screams rather than gunshots. This was not the only massacre that took place that night. Two other village sites were raided, on the Eel River and on the South Spit. Reports of the number of Wiyots killed that night vary from 80 to 200; they were mostly women and children, who were apart from the men conducting ceremonies. There was one survivor of the massacred group on Tuluwat, an infant named Jerry James.

Gunther had been asleep on the mainland across Humboldt Bay from the Island and had awakened to what he thought were screams, but went back to sleep. The next morning he was awakened by the Justice of the Peace who went with Gunther to inspect the Island following reports that Indians had been killed. He was appalled by what he saw, recalling " …what a sight presented itself to our eyes. Corpses lying all around, and all women and children, but two. Most of them had their skulls split. One old Indian, who looked to be a hundred years old, had his skull split, and still he sat there shivering". Gunther initially desired to bring the guilty to justice, but learned "We soon found that we had better keep our mouths shut."

Three other attacks on Indian settlements took place within two days: at the South Spit (Eureka), at South Fork Eel River (Rohnerville), and at Eagle Prairie (Rio Dell). Gunther said, "It was never publicly known who did the killing, yet secretly the parties were pointed out."

The 1860 massacre was well documented historically and was reported in San Francisco and New York City by the young American writer Bret Harte. Harte was working as a printer's helper and assistant editor at a local newspaper at the time, and his boss was temporarily absent, leaving Harte in charge of the paper. Harte published a detailed account condemning the event, writing, "a more shocking and revolting spectacle never was exhibited to the eyes of a Christian and civilized people. Old women wrinkled and decrepit lay weltering in blood, their brains dashed out and dabbled with their long grey hair. Infants scarcely a span along, with their faces cloven with hatchets and their bodies ghastly with wounds."

Major Gabriel J. Rains, commander of Fort Humboldt, reported on the massacre to his superiors that "Captain Wright's Company [of vigilantes] held a meeting at Eel River and resolved to kill every peaceable Indian – man, woman, and child." The vigilantes were also known as the "Humboldt Volunteers, Second Brigade," reported to have organized at Hydesville (the town called "Eel River" by Major Rains is now named Rohnerville). Rains reported that around five men had formed a volunteer squad to murder the sleeping women and children on the island. In his army reports, appalled at the massacres and at the openly discussed aims of the local white settlers to kill the Wiyot, he stated there were 55 killed at Indian Island, 40 on South Fork Eel River, and 35 at Eagle Prairie. South Fork Eel River became Rohnerville and was later annexed by Fortuna; Eagle Prairie is now the site of the town of Rio Dell.

Meanwhile, The Humboldt Times newspaper editorialized, "For the past four years we have advocated two—and only two—alternatives for ridding our country of Indians: either remove them to some reservation or kill them. The loss of life and destruction of property by the Indians for ten years past has not failed to convince every sensitive man that the two races cannot live together, and the recent desperate and bloody demonstrations on Indian Island and elsewhere is proof that the time has arrived that either the pale face or the savage must yield the ground."

The Times apparently represented the mainstream opinion in the area at the time. An investigation failed to identify a single perpetrator, although those who did the killing were rumored to be well known. Although a grand jury summoned witnesses and held hearings, no one was indicted. Harte was threatened and in danger of mob violence. He quit his job and left Union in March 1860 by the steamer Columbia for San Francisco, where an anonymous letter published in a city paper is attributed to him, describing widespread community approval of the massacre.

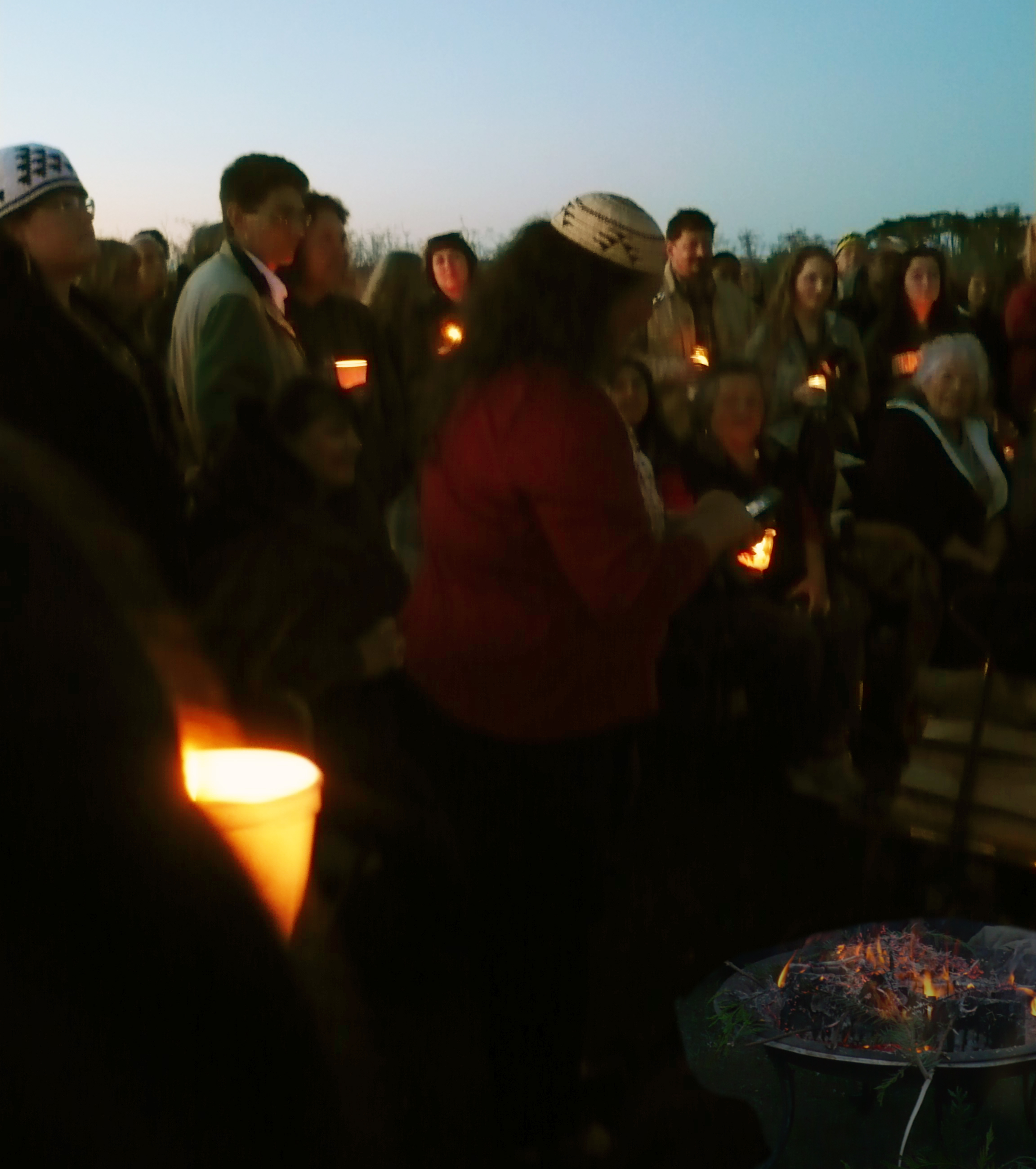
Wiyot elders in 2014 at a vigil memorializing the 1860 Wiyot Massacre

The Wiyot people were thus decimated. They were corralled at Fort Humboldt for protection however many died there. Survivors were herded mostly to Round Valley, established as an Indian reservation within California, but they kept escaping and returning to their homeland.

=== Population decline ===
By 1850, there were about 2,000 Wiyot and Karok people living within this area. After 1860, there were an estimated 200 people left. By 1910, there were fewer than 100 full-blood Wiyot people living within their ancestral territory. This rapid decline in population occurred due to disease, slavery, murder, protection, being herded from place to place (survivors' descendants describe this as "death marches"), and massacres.

Memorials have been held annually at Tuluwat village, on what is now known as Tuluwat Island, since 1992, and a major cultural and environmental restoration project is underway there. More recently, the long-awaited World Renewal Ceremony has returned to the island, and is in the process of being revived by current tribal members. This event is private and central to Wiyot cultural beliefs.

=== Reservation ===
In 2000, the Wiyot established the Table Bluff Reservation on 88 acres (360,000 m^{2}) of their homeland. The reservation is 16 miles (26 km) south of Eureka between Loleta and the South Jetty of Humboldt Bay. Some 350 people are enrolled in the Table Bluff Reservation – Wiyot Tribe. "Table Bluff Rancheria of Wiyot Indians of California" is the name under which the United States federal government previously listed the Table Bluff Reservation in the Bureau of Indian Affairs list of federally recognized tribes; "Table Bluff Reservation – Wiyot Tribe" is the current designation. Some people of Wiyot descent are enrolled in the Bear River Rancheria.

Since October 2019, the Wiyot have had the land deed to most of Tuluwat Island, which previously was owned by the City of Eureka.

== Culture and religion ==
The last documented native speaker of Wiyot died in 1962. The Wiyot tribal government is in the process of reviving the language.

The people ate mostly clams and acorns, and made long, carved, log canoes. Healers and ceremonial leaders were mostly women, who received their powers on mountaintops during the night.

The Wiyot religion shares much in common with that of the neighboring Yurok with certain differences.

A central act in the Wiyot people's spirituality is an annual World Renewal Ceremony held at Tuluwat village. Tuluwat Island, formerly Indian Island, was and is the center of the Wiyot world. On the island, at the start of each year, a ceremonial dance called the World Renewal ceremony was held, which lasted seven to ten days. Ceremonial masks were worn during the dance. All people were welcomed; no one was turned away. It was held at the village site of Tuluwat on the northern part of the island. Traditionally the men would leave the island and return the next day with the day's supplies. The elders, women and children were left to rest on the island along with a few men.

== Population ==
Alfred L. Kroeber put the 1770 population of the Wiyot at 1,000. Sherburne F. Cook initially offered an estimate of 1,500 but subsequently raised this to 3,300. Kroeber reported the population of the Wiyot in 1910 as 100.

The Wiyot suffered a devastating onslaught of violence by American settlers in the 1850s and 1860s, wiping out the majority of those alive in 1850 and dispossessing them of their lands. Surviving members of the tribe intermarried with neighboring groups, including the Yurok. About 500 Wiyot live in Northern California today, still well below their mid-19th century population of 2,000.

== Recent events ==
In a step towards making amends, in June 2004 the Eureka City Council transferred 40 acres (160,000 m^{2}) of Tuluwat Island back to the Wiyot tribe, to add to 1.5 acres (6,100 m^{2}) the Wiyot had purchased. The council also transferred 60 acres (240,000 m^{2}) on the northeast tip of the 275-acre (1.11 km^{2}) island on May 18, 2006.

Tuluwat, the sacred Wiyot village of Tuluwat Island, is currently being restored by the Wiyot tribe. Eureka businesses have stepped forward to donate supplies and trash barges, and the citizens of Eureka have donated to a Tuluwat restoration fund.

In 2013, Wiyot tribe members returned to Tuluwat Island by canoe, and announced plans to hold another World Renewal Ceremony; it will be the first such ceremony to take place on the island since the massacre.

In 2022, the Wiyot historical culture center opened in Eureka.

In November 2024, Digawututklh protected area, formerly called Samoa Dunes and Wetlands Conservation Area, was transferred to the Wiyot tribe.

== See also ==
- Wiyot traditional narratives
