= List of National Natural Landmarks in California =

There are 37 National Natural Landmarks in California.

California National Natural Landmarks (clickable map)

Name	Image	Date	Location	County	Ownership	Description
Amboy Crater		May 1973	34°31′11.69″N 115°43′26.92″W	San Bernardino	Federal (Bureau of Land Management)	A 6,000-year-old volcanic cinder cone, made up of pahoehoe, just off historic U.S. Highway 66.
American River Bluffs and Phoenix Park Vernal Pools	American River	1976	38°39′10.33″N 121°12′59.95″W	Sacramento	Federal (United States Bureau of Reclamation), state (California State Parks), and municipal (Fair Oaks Recreation and Park District)	Contains vernal pools, and blue oak woodlands.
Año Nuevo State Reserve	Año Nuevo State Reserve	1980	37°7′7.24″N 122°18′24.02″W	San Mateo	State (California Department of Parks and Recreation)	One of the largest mainland breeding grounds for the northern elephant seal.
Anza-Borrego Desert	Anza-Borrego Desert	1974	33°14′57.38″N 116°24′24.63″W	Imperial, Riverside, San Diego	State (California Department of Parks and Recreation)	The largest desert state park in the nation.
Audubon Canyon	Audubon Canyon	1968	37°55′46.01″N 122°40′55.85″W	Marin	Private	The largest known nesting area for great blue herons and great and snowy egrets on the Pacific Coast.
Black Chasm Cave	Black Chasm Cave	1976	38°26′3.4″N 120°37′35.3″W	Amador	Private	A small three-level cave containing a variety of speleothems and some of the best helictite formations in the western U.S.
Burney Falls	Burney Falls	1984	41°0′43.79″N 121°39′7″W	Shasta	State (California Department of Parks and Recreation)	Contains some of the best examples in the western United States of a river drainage regulated by stratigraphically controlled springs.
Cinder Cone Natural Area	Cinder Cone	1973	35°17′21.95″N 115°35′6.99″W	San Bernardino	Federal (Mojave National Preserve)	A complex of over 20 large cinder cones of recent origin with extensive and continuous lava flows.
Cosumnes River Riparian Woodlands	Cosumnes River Preserve	1976	38°15′56.57″N 121°26′21.22″W	Sacramento	Private, Federal, State, and County	A small remnant of a rapidly-disappearing riparian woodland community type that once formed a major part of the central valley.
Deep Springs Marsh		1975	37°20′00″N 118°01′03″W	Inyo	Private	An example of increasingly rare desert marsh.
Dixon Vernal Pools		1987	38°16′31.29″N 121°49′25.49″W	Solano	Private	The best example of valley needlegrass grassland in the central valley.
Elder Creek		1964	39°43′32.04″N 123°37′34.35″W	Mendocino	State (University of California Natural Reserve System)	A largely undisturbed watershed containing large old stands of Douglas fir, broadleaf evergreens, and deciduous trees.
Emerald Bay	Emerald Bay	1968	38°57′25.49″N 120°5′36.3″W	El Dorado	State (California Department of Parks and Recreation)	An outstanding example of glacial geology.
Eureka Dunes		1983	37°5′45.6″N 117°40′30″W	Inyo	Federal (Death Valley National Park)	The tallest dune complex in the Great Basin.
Fish Slough Area of Critical Environmental Concern		1975	37°28′8.69″N 118°24′3.1″W	Inyo, Mono	Mixed- federal (Bureau of Land Management), state, municipal	A large, essentially undisturbed, desert wetland that provides habitat for the alkali mariposa lily and the endangered Owens pupfish.
Guadalupe-Nipomo Dunes	Guadalupe-Nipomo Dunes	1974	34°57′56.13″N 120°39′1.24″W	San Luis Obispo	Mixed- federal (Guadalupe-Nipomo Dunes National Wildlife Refuge), state, private	A coastal dune tract with off-road vehicle recreation, a national wildlife refuge, beaches, and nesting for the western snowy plover.
Imperial Sand Hills		1966	32°55′0″N 115°3′0″W	Imperial	Federal (Bureau of Land Management)	One of the largest dune patches in the United States.
Irvine Ranch Natural Landmarks		2006	33°43′53.4″N 117°41′34.8″W	Orange	Mixed- state, county, municipal	A remarkably complete stratigraphic succession ranging in age from late Cretaceous to the present.
Lake Shasta Caverns	Lake Shasta Caverns	May 2012	40°48′16.2″N 122°18′15.98″W	Shasta	Private	A well-decorated Solutional cave that contains a diverse assemblage of calcite cave formations.
Lanphere Dunes and Ma-le'l Dunes		2021		Humboldt	Federal (Bureau of Land Management, Humboldt Bay National Wildlife Refuge)	Considered to be the largest and best quality sand dune ecosystems representing coastal dunes in the area.
Miramar Mounds		1972	32°50′43″N 117°8′19″W	San Diego	Federal (Marine Corps Air Station Miramar)	Contains unique soil features called mima mounds, which are found in only three or four locations in the country, and vernal pools.
Mitchell Caverns and Winding Stair Cave	Mitchell Caverns	1975	34°56′26.97″N 115°30′51.97″W	San Bernardino	State (California Department of Parks and Recreation)	Regarded as the most important solution caverns in the Mojave Desert.
Mt. Diablo State Park	Mt Diablo	1982	37°52′37.75″N 121°55′25.79″W	Contra Costa	State (California Department of Parks and Recreation)	One of the few areas in the region where geologic strata of Jurassic, Cretaceous, and Tertiary age can be seen in an aggregate thickness of 42,000 feet (13,000 m).
Mount Shasta	Mount Shasta	1976	41°24′35.6″N 122°11′41.52″W	Siskiyou	Federal (Shasta-Trinity National Forest)	One of the world's largest and most impressive stratovolcanoes, within the Shasta-Trinity National Forest.
Pixley Vernal Pools		1987	35°59′3.85″N 119°12′45.04″W	Tulare	Private	One of the few remaining natural vernal pools containing rare endemic crustacean species such as vernal pool fairy shrimp.
Point Lobos	Point Lobos	1967	36°31′1.56″N 121°56′33.36″W	Monterey	State (California Department of Parks and Recreation)	An outstanding example of terrestrial and marine environments in close association, and the only known habitat of Monterey cypress and variegated brodiaea.
Pygmy Forest at Jug Handle State Natural Reserve	Pygmy forest at Jug Handle State Natural Reserve	1969 1973	39°22′29.3″N 123°47′22.15″W	Mendocino	State (California Department of Parks and Recreation)	Includes a five step ecological staircase on which a unique forest of low, stunted trees and shrubs is located.
Rainbow Basin	Rainbow Basin syncline	1966	35°1′46″N 117°2′12″W	San Bernardino	Federal (Bureau of Land Management)	Deep erosion canyons with rugged rims with fossil evidence of insects and Miocene mammals.
La Brea Tar Pits (Rancho La Brea)		1964	34°3′46.62″N 118°21′21.49″W	Los Angeles	Municipal (City of Los Angeles)	Site of the world-famous natural asphalt tar pits.
San Andreas Fault	San Adreas Fault	1965		San Benito	Private	One of the best illustrations of earth displacement caused by small crustal movements.
San Felipe Creek Area		1974	33°10′11″N 115°49′19″W	Imperial, San Diego	Federal (Bureau of Land Management), state (California Department of Fish and Wildlife)	A marsh containing probably the last remaining perennial natural desert stream in the Colorado Desert region.
Sand Ridge Wildflower Preserve	Sand Ridge Wildflower Preserve	1984	35°18′31.26″N 118°47′24.29″W	Kern	Private	A remnant natural area displaying a great diversity of floral species including the Bakersfield cactus.
Sharktooth Hill		1976	35°26′30.57″N 118°56′26.18″W	Kern	Private	One of the most abundant, diverse and well- preserved fossil marine vertebrate sites in the world.
Tijuana River Estuary	Tijuana River	1973	32°33′7.2″N 117°7′9.59″W	San Diego	Federal (Tijuana River National Estuarine Research Reserve), state, municipal	One of the finest remaining saltwater marshes on the California coastline.
Torrey Pines State Natural Reserve	Torrey Pintes	1977	32°54′59.58″N 117°14′58.7″W	San Diego	State (California Department of Parks and Recreation)	Contains a natural Torrey pine forest, high bluffs and sea cliffs, and endangered bird species.
Trona Pinnacles	Trona Pinnacles	1967	35°37′3.81″N 117°22′5.08″W	San Bernardino	Federal (Bureau of Land Management)	A relict landform from the Pleistocene containing unique formations of calcium carbonate.
Turtle Mountain	Turtle Mountains (California)	1973	34°19′5.53″N 114°51′7.28″W	San Bernardino	Federal (Bureau of Land Management), state	Contains two mountain sections of entirely different composition.

== See also ==
- List of National Historic Landmarks in California
