= Ma-le'l Dunes =

Coordinates: 40.8724°N 124.1518°W

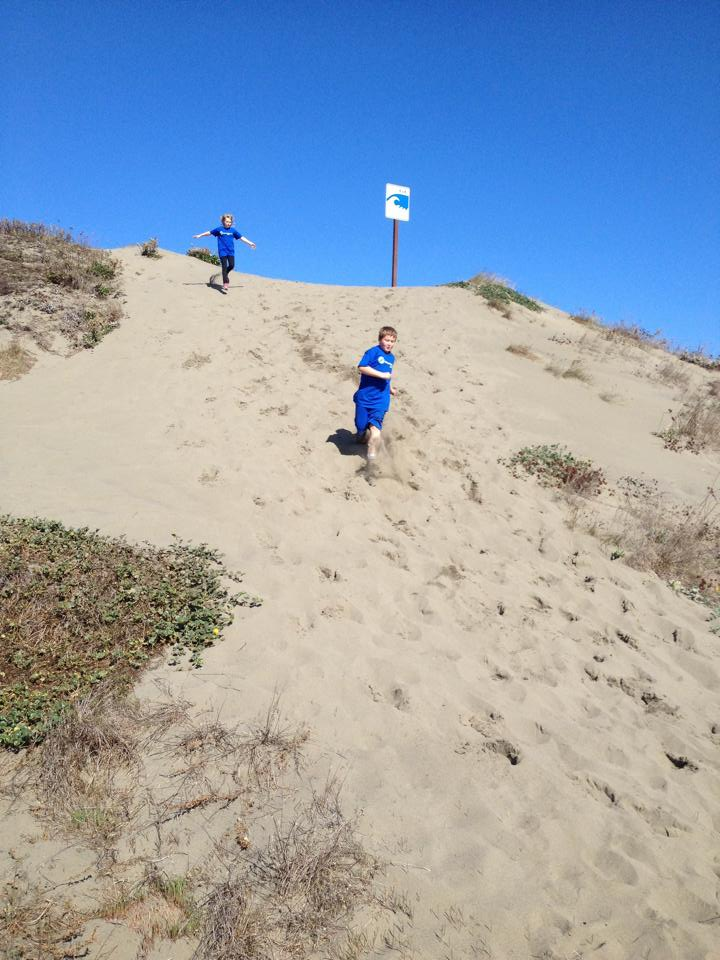
Recreation at Ma-le'l Dunes

The Ma-le’l Dunes Cooperative Management Area (CMA) is located south of Lanphere Dunes at the upper end of the North Spit of Humboldt Bay, being approximately one mile north of the unincorporated town of Manila and 3.5 miles (5.6 km) west of the City of Arcata, in Humboldt County, California. It consists of approximately 444 acres (180 ha) of public land. Ma-le’l dunes are divided into northern and southern sections. The northern portion is part of Humboldt Bay National Wildlife Refuge and is administered by the U.S. Fish and Wildlife Service (FWS). The southern portion of Ma-le’l is managed by the Bureau of Land Management (BLM) and provides access to the coastal dune environment for dog-walking and equestrian use on designated trails.

== Flora ==
Dunes succession is well-illustrated at Ma-le’l Dunes, which also provides habitat for unique flora, with two listed under the Endangered Species Act: Humboldt Bay wallflower (Erysimum menziesii) and beach layia (Layia carnosa). From 2005 to 2010 removal of European beachgrass (Ammophila arenaria) and other non-native plants was done in an attempt to provide native species expansion and increase biodiversity. Invasive species eradication removes vegetation that inhibits natural succession and/or alters soil that impacts native species.
