= Coul Links =

Area of sand dunes in Scotland

Coordinates: 57.925°N 4.009°W

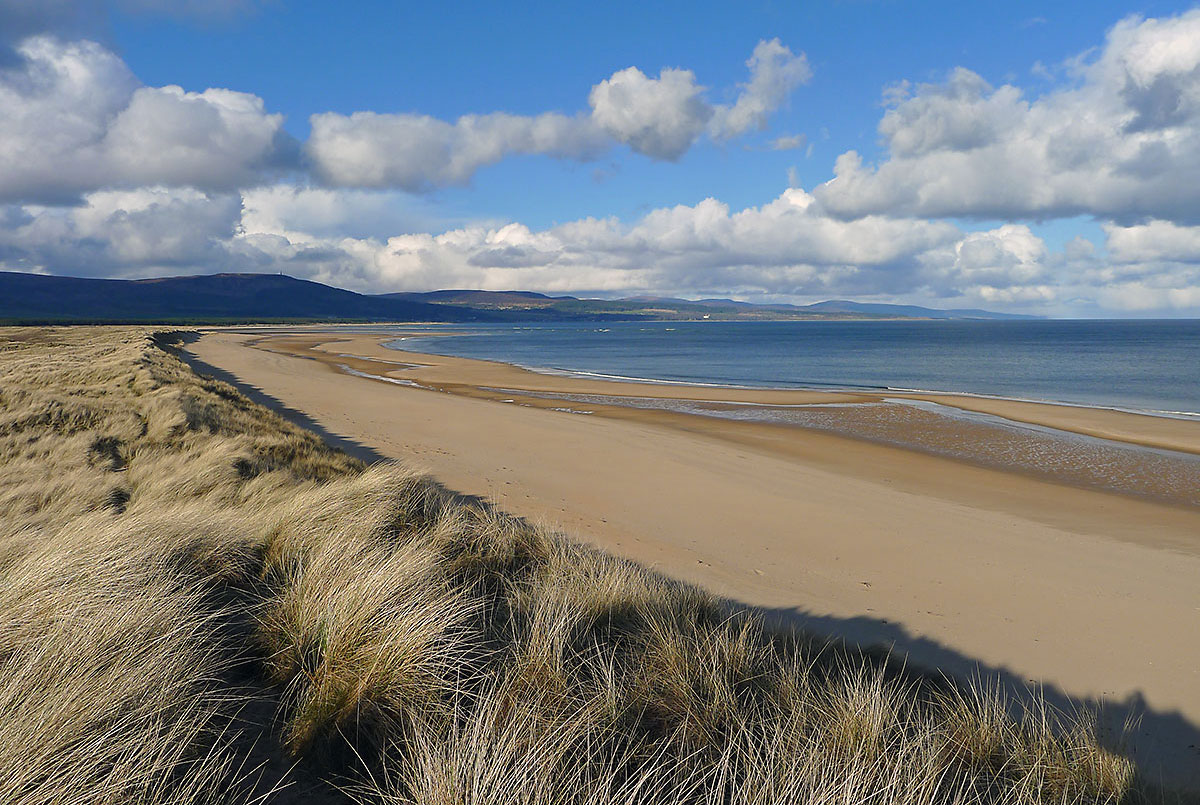
The beach of Embo Sands lies alongside Coul Links.

Location of Coul Links within Sutherland

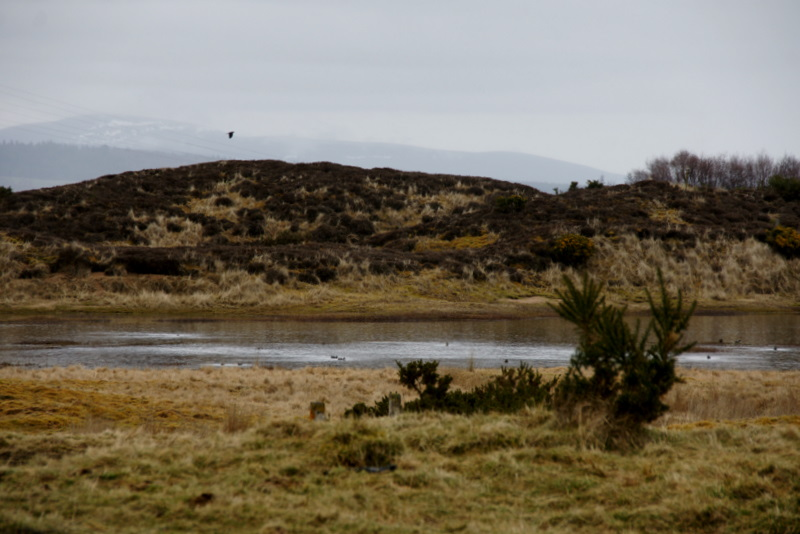
A lochan between the dunes at Coul Links.

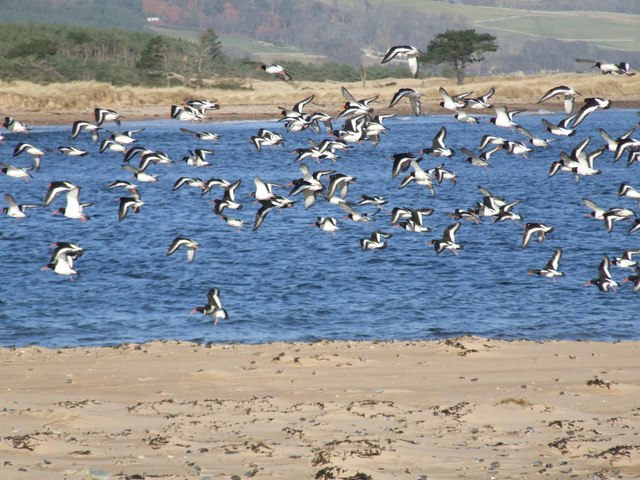
Oystercatchers at the mouth of Loch Fleet, at the northern end of the links.

Coul Links is an area of sand dunes (referred to as "links" in the Scots language) in Sutherland, on the east coast of Scotland. It is located between Golspie and Dornoch, lying just to the north of the small village of Embo. The links are considered unusual within Scotland in displaying a complete transition from the foredune to dune system and coastal heathland. They also include habitats such as flooded slacks (troughs between dunes) and seasonal lochs. The links lie on the eastern side of Loch Fleet, and form part of the Loch Fleet Site of Special Scientific Interest (SSSI), the Dornoch Firth and Loch Fleet Special Protection Area (SPA), and the Dornoch Firth and Loch Fleet Ramsar site, but are outwith the Loch Fleet national nature reserve (NNR). Between 1985 and 2010 the Scottish Wildlife Trust (SWT) managed Coul Links under an agreement with the landowner, however the agreement was not renewed when it expired. The SWT continues to be involved in the management of the adjacent Loch Fleet NNR.

A wide variety of plants are found on the links, including variegated horsetail, purple milk-vetch, rue-leaved saxifrage, moonwort and frog orchid. The heathland parts of the links host areas of juniper scrub. The site is important for Fonseca's seed fly (Botanophila fonsecai), as it represents over 30% of the known global range of the species, which is endemic to the sand dunes of the east coast of Scotland. The links also host several other nationally rare species of invertebrate. Dog walkers, horse riding and unauthorised vehicle use at the links have been known to disturb terns, which occasionally attempt to nest on Coul Links.

== Golf course proposals ==
In 2015 a company led by American Todd Warnock proposed to build a golf course on the links, which would have involved disturbing about 13 ha of dune habitat at Coul Links. Objections to the golf course were submitted by the Scottish Wildlife Trust, Scottish Natural Heritage, RSPB Scotland, Plantlife Scotland, Ramblers Scotland, the National Trust for Scotland and the International Otter Survival Fund. The objectors claimed that creation of a golf course would fundamentally affect the natural processes which have created the links, ending the natural movement of material that was a key part of the dune system, and would adversely affect the unique and protected flora and fauna of the site, as well as failing to fulfil legal obligations in respect of international conservation designations such as the Ramsar listing.

The developers claimed that a golf course would improve conditions for birdlife on the links, as shooting of wildfowl would no longer be permitted, and that disturbance from visitors would reduce, especially during winter months when the course was closed. They noted that site received no specific habitat management, and claimed that this would be undertaken as a legally binding planning condition if permission were to be granted. The developers also proposed to purchase adjacent land and manage this for conservation purposes, and forecasted potential economic benefits such as increased employment and more tourism in the local area. Objectors questioned the economic case, noting that the controversial Menie golf development at Balmedie (which was undertaken by The Trump Organization, and has been compared to the Coul Links situation) failed to create the number of jobs or economic benefits predicted.

Highland Council approved the plan on 20 June 2018, however in August the Scottish Government decided to "call in" the decision for further scrutiny at a national level. On 26 February 2019 the government decided that the matter would be decided by a planning inquiry, and the government's Planning and Architecture Division formally refused permission for the development in February 2020.
