= Seed fly =

Seed fly may refer to:

- the bean seed fly (Delia platura), a fly species in the family Anthomyiidae
- the ragwort seed fly (Botanophila seneciella), a fly species in the family Anthomyiidae
