= Lanphere Dunes =

Dune complex in California

Coordinates: 40°53′56″N 124°8′41″W

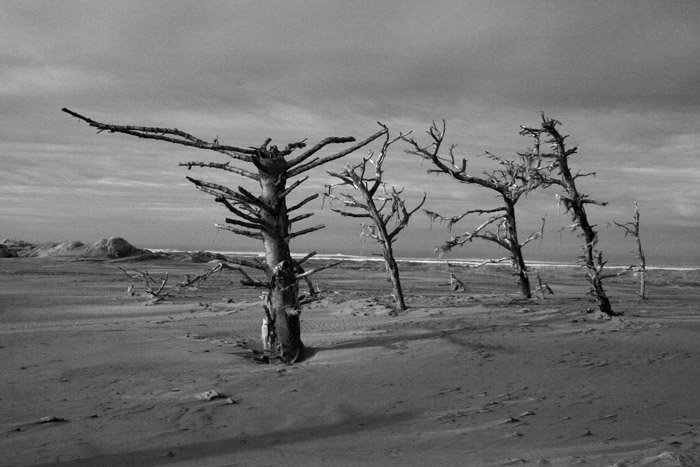
The Lanphere Dunes before a storm

The Lanphere Dunes National Natural Landmark a unit of the Humboldt Bay National Wildlife Refuge Complex, is located in Humboldt County, California. The dune complex consists of the wave slope, fore dune, herbaceous and woody swales, coniferous and riparian forest, freshwater swamp, freshwater marsh, brackish marsh, salt marsh, and intertidal mudflats. The site exemplifies dunes succession.

== History ==
The area was historically occupied by Wiyot prior to European settlement when, in the 1930s, William and Hortense Lanphere made it their home. For the next 40 years they maintained the dunes in a relatively pristine state. In 1975 a movement for permanent protection was made by the Lanpheres and faculty from Humboldt State University who used the area for botany classes. Working with The Nature Conservancy the area was protected and turned over to the National Wildlife Refuge System for management. Site management focuses on the prevention and eradication of invasive plants and the restoration of dune and estuarine processes. In January 2021, nine hundred acres of Lanphere Dunes and Ma-le'l Dunes, the first dune habitat restoration project on the West Coast, were designated as National Natural Landmarks by the U.S. Department of the Interior and will continue to be managed by the U.S. Fish and Wildlife Service and the Bureau of Land Management.

== Flora and fauna ==
=== Flora ===
Due to its isolation, Lanphere Dunes is home to many uncommon and geographically displaced flora including two federally listed species found in this habitat: Humboldt Bay wallflower (Erysimum menziesii subsp. menziesii) and beach layia (Layia carnosa). Other rare and endangered plants include Pink sand-verbena (Abronia umbellata subsp.brevifolia), Humboldt Bay owl's clover (Castilleja ambigua subsp. humboldtiensis), Point Reyes bird's-beak (Cordylanthus maritimus subsp. palustris), dark-eyed gilia (Gilia millefoliata), American glehnia (Glehnia littoralis subsp. leiocarpa), western sand spurrey (Spergularia canadensis subsp. occidentalis) and the sea-watch (Angelica lucida). Other species of plants include Kinnikinnick (Arcotstaphylos uva-ursi) and reindeer lichen (Cladonia rangiferina).

Many of the lichens and flora that still thrive in the Lanphere Dunes, including reindeer lichens, date back to the Ice Age. Varieties of flora often found in Lanphere Dunes that are typically common are often far away from their natural ranges. Sands that are blown in with the occasional ocean breezes remain trapped in the forests, killing off the trees and leaving behind "skeleton forests," areas where all the husks of former trees are plentiful. American Dunegrass (Leymus mollis) used to be plentiful, once found along the west coast as south as Morro Bay in California, this native grass now occurs in just two areas along the California coast, Point Reyes and the Lanphere Dunes. European Beachgrass is an invasive species that was found to be omnipresent in the Lanphere Dunes, having taken over many of the areas formally occupied by native grasses. Between 1992 and 1997, European Beachgrass from the dune zone was manually removed by laborers from the California Conservation Corps funded by the Nature Conservancy. After starting the restoration project in 1992, native plant cover in Lanphere Dunes increased by 47% by the year 1997 without the assistance of active re-planting.

Native species of dunes grass that have experienced a comeback in population count are American dunegrass, silver bursage, beach morning glory (Convolvulus soldanella), and dune tansy also referred to as (Tanacetum douglasii). Together, all these dune grasses form the fore dune's ecosystem that used to be extensive along the coast before the spread of invasive species.

=== Fauna ===
Lanphere Dunes provides shelter and forage for larger animals including black-tailed deer, bobcat, mountain lion, grey fox and porcupine. Smaller mammals that live in Lanphere Dunes include the dusky-footed woodrat, white-footed deer mouse, Pacific jumping mouse, California harvest mouse, Trowbridge shrew, Vagrant shrews, shrew moles, California voles, the rare white-footed vole and Botta's pocket gopher (Homomys bottae laticeps) are recorded. Due to their adaptability, coyote, gray fox, Virginia opossum and raccoon can be found in a wide variety of the refuge habitats.
