= Botanophila fonsecai =

Conservation status
- Endangered (IUCN 3.1)

Scientific classification
- Kingdom: Animalia
- Phylum: Arthropoda
- Class: Insecta
- Order: Diptera
- Family: Anthomyiidae
- Genus: Botanophila
- Species: B. fonsecai

Binomial name
- Botanophila fonsecai Ackland, 1989

Species of fly

Botanophila fonsecai, also known as Fonseca's seed fly, is a small fly endemic only to an approximately 100 m stretch of coastal dune system of north-eastern Scotland. The fly is named after British entomologist Evelyn d'Assis-Fonseca. It is classified as an endangered species by the IUCN Red List due to its small habitat range and constant threats to these limited environments. The fly is probably the rarest endemic insect species in the UK.

The species was initially described in 1965 during a survey of Dornoch Firth, with the type specimen caught by d'Assis-Fonseca in 1971. However it was first described as a novel species in 1989 by Michael Ackland. The type specimen is housed at the Natural History Museum, London.

This fly is endemic to the county of Sutherland in northeastern Scotland. Its range extends for a length of about 8.1 km (5.0 mi) along the coast of the Dornoch Firth, and it has a total area of occupancy of about 16 km^{2} (6.2 mi^{2}) at four known locations. Its habitat is the dune system where lyme grass (Leymus arenarius), cord grass (Spartina anglica) and marram grass (Ammophila arenaria), ragwort (Jacobaea vulgaris) and sow thistle (Sonchus spp) grow, along with limited amounts of cat's-ear (Hypochaeris radicata) and hawkweed (Hieracium spp). On the more consolidated back part of the dunes there is a richer flora which includes devil's bit scabious (Succisa pratensis) as well as ragwort.

A 2013 survey commissioned by Scottish Natural Heritage found some specimens of the fly, and a potential association of the larvae with ragwort or sow thistle. The survey suggested that populations have declined since similar surveys conducted in the 1970s and 1980s. Threats to the fly include trampling of habitat from people on the dunes, as well as a potential golf course at Coul Links.
