= Botanophila vallaris =

Scientific classification
- Kingdom: Animalia
- Phylum: Arthropoda
- Clade: Pancrustacea
- Class: Insecta
- Order: Diptera
- Family: Anthomyiidae
- Genus: Botanophila
- Species: B. vallaris

Binomial name
- Botanophila vallaris (Huckett, 1965)

Species of fly

Botanophila vallaris is a species of fly from Botanophila genus, Anthomyiidae family. It was described for first time by H. C. Huckett in 1965. According to the Catalogue of Life, Botanophila Species vallaris does not have any known subspecies.
