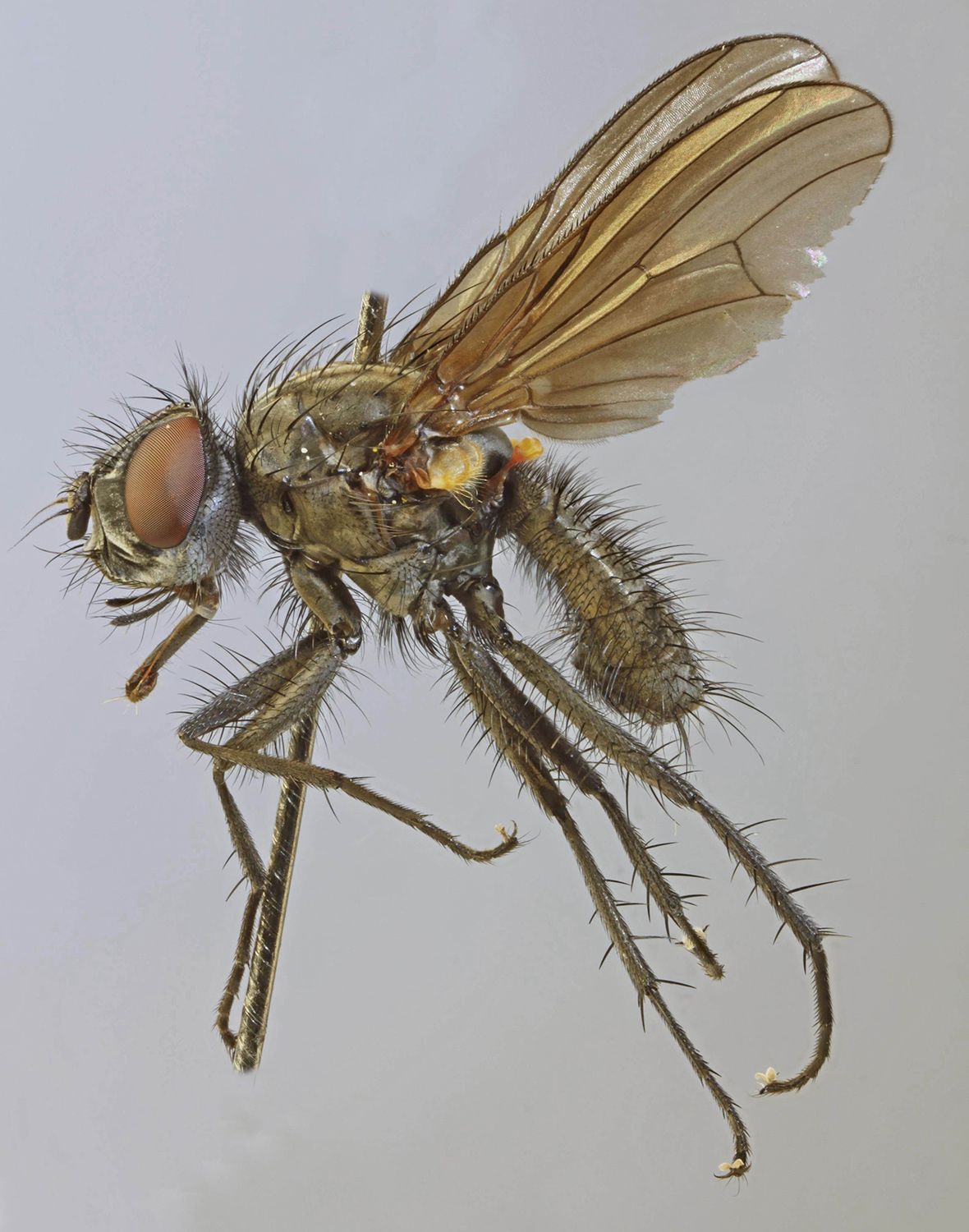
- Botanophila discreta North Wales

Scientific classification
- Kingdom: Animalia
- Phylum: Arthropoda
- Class: Insecta
- Order: Diptera
- Family: Anthomyiidae
- Genus: Botanophila
- Species: B. discreta

Binomial name
- Botanophila discreta (Meigen, 1826)

Synonyms
- Anthomyia discreta Meigen, 1826

= Botanophila discreta =

Species of fly

Botanophila discreta is a species of fly in the family Anthomyiidae. It is found in the Palearctic.
