= Botanophila lobata =

Scientific classification
- Domain: Eukaryota
- Kingdom: Animalia
- Phylum: Arthropoda
- Class: Insecta
- Order: Diptera
- Family: Anthomyiidae
- Genus: Botanophila
- Species: B. lobata

Binomial name
- Botanophila lobata (Collin, 1967)

Species of fly

Botanophila lobata is a species of fly in the genus Botanophila, Anthomyiidae family. It was described the first time by James Edward Collin in the year 1967. The species can be found in England, Czechoslovakia and in Korea
