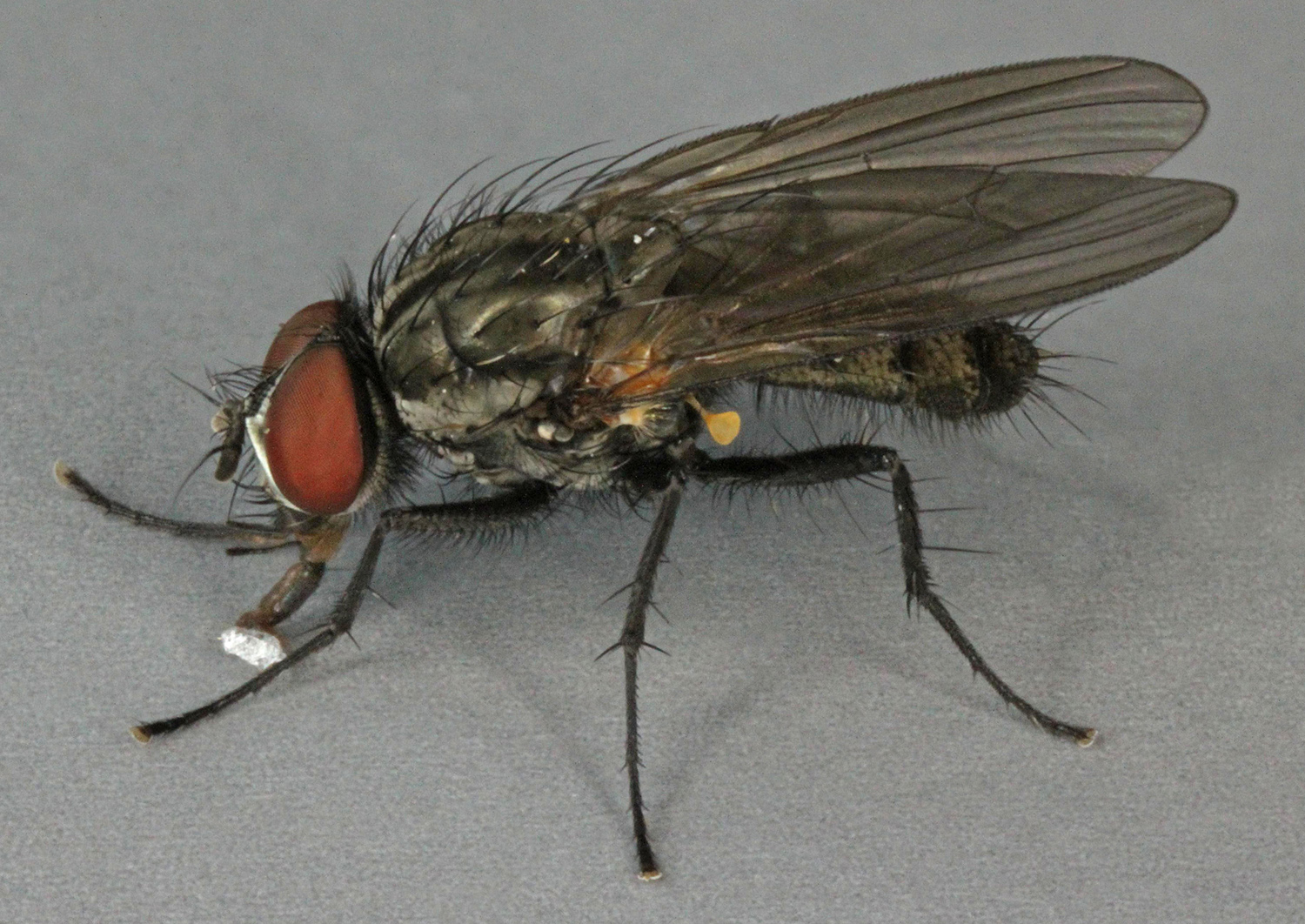
- Botanophila fugax North Wales

Scientific classification
- Kingdom: Animalia
- Phylum: Arthropoda
- Class: Insecta
- Order: Diptera
- Family: Anthomyiidae
- Genus: Botanophila
- Species: B. fugax

Binomial name
- Botanophila fugax (Meigen, 1826)

Synonyms
- Anthomyia fugax Meigen, 1826; Chortophila pudica Rondani, 1866

= Botanophila fugax =

Species of fly

Botanophila fugax is a species of fly in the family Anthomyiidae. It is found in the Palearctic. The larva is a stem borer.

Fungal species Strongwellsea crypta (from genus Strongwellsea, order Entomophthorales) is known to infect Botanophila fugax. It creates abdominal holes in the infected hosts which then develop rapidly and become strikingly large and almost rhomboid in shape.
