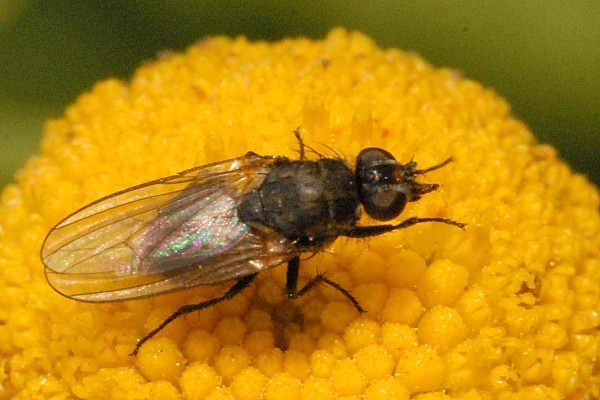
- Botanophila fugax

Scientific classification
- Kingdom: Animalia
- Phylum: Arthropoda
- Class: Insecta
- Order: Diptera
- Family: Anthomyiidae
- Subfamily: Anthomyiinae
- Tribe: Anthomyini
- Genus: Botanophila; Lioy, 1864

Type species
- Anthomyia varicolor Meigen, 1826

Synonyms
- Egeria Robineau-Desvoidy, 1830; Pegohylemyia Schnabl & Dziedzicki, 1911; Pseudomyopina Ringdahl, 1933; Xanthocnemia Karl, 1943

= Botanophila =

Genus of flies

Botanophila is a genus of flies of the family Anthomyiidae.

== Species ==
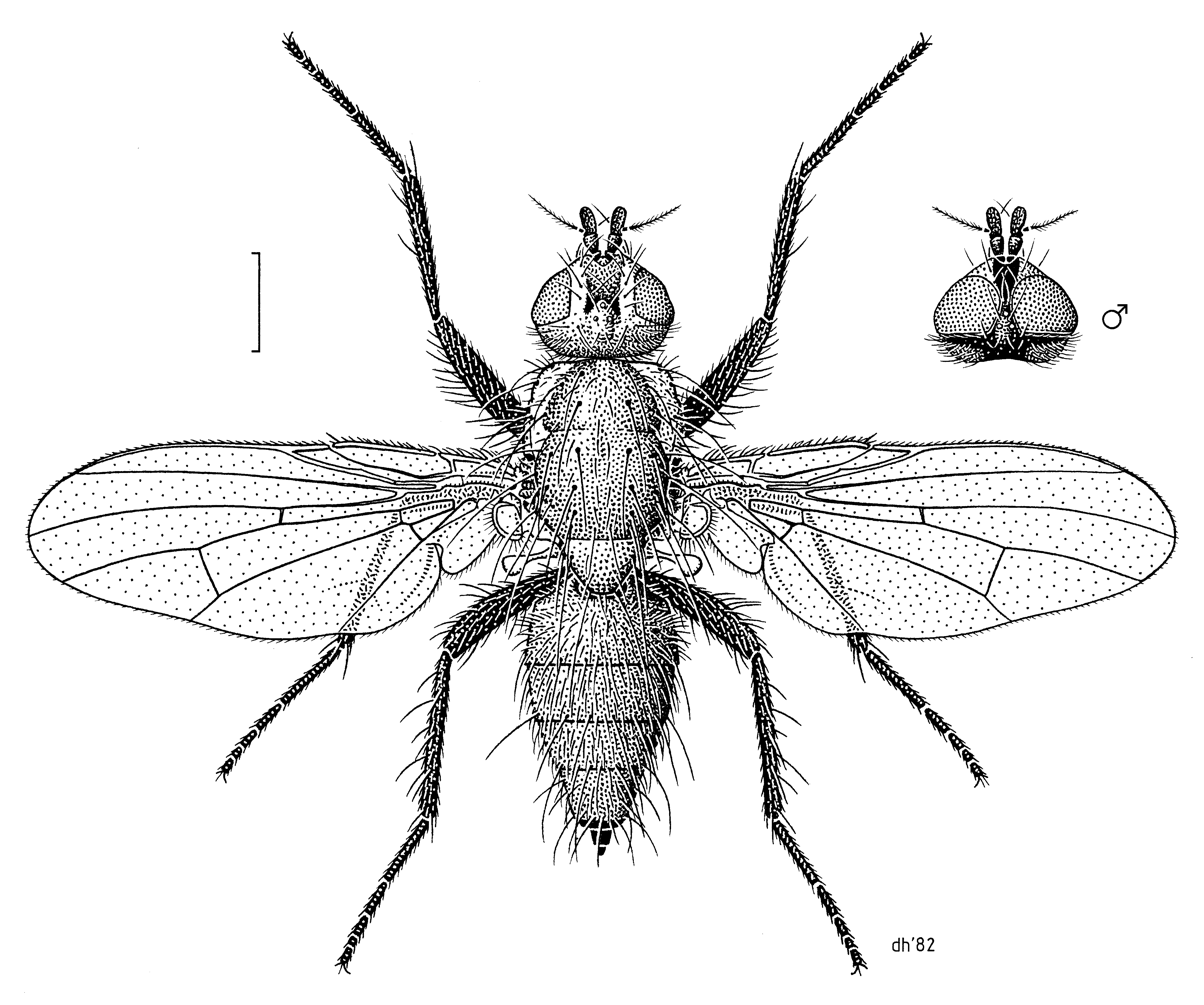
Botanophila jacobaeae illustrated by Des Helmore

List of species according to Catalogue of Life:

- Botanophila abitibiensis
- Botanophila aborta
- Botanophila acquiescens
- Botanophila acudepressa
- Botanophila acuticauda
- Botanophila adusta
- Botanophila aklavika
- Botanophila alatavensis
- Botanophila alcaecerca
- Botanophila aliena
- Botanophila alishana
- Botanophila alligata
- Botanophila anane
- Botanophila angulosa
- Botanophila angustisilva
- Botanophila apiciseta
- Botanophila apodicra
- Botanophila appendiculata
- Botanophila araeoglossa
- Botanophila argyrometopa
- Botanophila ascoidica
- Botanophila atra
- Botanophila atrovittata
- Botanophila aurisquama
- Botanophila benegalensis
- Botanophila betarum
- Botanophila bicillaris
- Botanophila bidens
- Botanophila bidigitata
- Botanophila biseriata
- Botanophila bompadrei
- Botanophila brevipalpis
- Botanophila brunneilinea
- Botanophila caligotypa
- Botanophila centaureae
- Botanophila cercodiscoides
- Botanophila changbaishanensis
- Botanophila chelonocerca
- Botanophila choui
- Botanophila chui
- Botanophila ciliata
- Botanophila clavata
- Botanophila coloriforcipis
- Botanophila consolata
- Botanophila convexifrons
- Botanophila cordifrons
- Botanophila cornuta
- Botanophila costispinata
- Botanophila cruriseta
- Botanophila cuneata
- Botanophila curvimargo
- Botanophila cuspidata
- Botanophila cylindrica
- Botanophila defector
- Botanophila degeensis
- Botanophila densisphinula
- Botanophila densispinula
- Botanophila depressa
- Botanophila destinatum
- Botanophila deuterocerci
- Botanophila dichops
- Botanophila discreta
- Botanophila dissecta
- Botanophila dolichocerca
- Botanophila edwardsiana
- Botanophila emeisencio
- Botanophila endotylata
- Botanophila enigmatica
- Botanophila estonica
- Botanophila eurymetopa
- Botanophila extensa
- Botanophila facettii
- Botanophila fanjingensis
- Botanophila fibulans
- Botanophila flavidisquama
- Botanophila flavisquama
- Botanophila fonsecai
- Botanophila formiceps
- Botanophila fugax
- Botanophila fumidipennis
- Botanophila fumidorsis
- Botanophila furcula
- Botanophila gemmata
- Botanophila gentianae
- Botanophila gentianaella
- Botanophila glauca
- Botanophila gnava
- Botanophila gnavoides
- Botanophila graeca
- Botanophila guizhouensis
- Botanophila hedleya
- Botanophila helviana
- Botanophila herschelensis
- Botanophila higuchii
- Botanophila himalacia
- Botanophila hortensis
- Botanophila hucketti
- Botanophila humeralis
- Botanophila impersonata
- Botanophila incrassata
- Botanophila infrafurcata
- Botanophila inornata
- Botanophila intermedia
- Botanophila isikariana
- Botanophila israelitica
- Botanophila jacobaeae
- Botanophila kanmiyai
- Botanophila karibae
- Botanophila kenji
- Botanophila kitadakeana
- Botanophila kitayamae
- Botanophila koreacola
- Botanophila kurilensis
- Botanophila lactuaeformis
- Botanophila laterella
- Botanophila latifrons
- Botanophila latifrontalis
- Botanophila latigena
- Botanophila latirufifrons
- Botanophila laxifrons
- Botanophila leucosa
- Botanophila lobata
- Botanophila longifurca
- Botanophila longifurcula
- Botanophila maculipedella
- Botanophila maculipes
- Botanophila marginata
- Botanophila marginella
- Botanophila mediospicula
- Botanophila mediotubera
- Botanophila medoga
- Botanophila melametopa
- Botanophila menyuanensis
- Botanophila miniatura
- Botanophila monacensis
- Botanophila monoconica
- Botanophila monostyla
- Botanophila monticola
- Botanophila montivaga
- Botanophila moriens
- Botanophila nigricauda
- Botanophila nigrifrontata
- Botanophila nigrigenis
- Botanophila nigriterminis
- Botanophila nigrodorsata
- Botanophila nitiditheca
- Botanophila nordica
- Botanophila nupera
- Botanophila nyamgasana
- Botanophila obtruda
- Botanophila odontogaster
- Botanophila okai
- Botanophila oraria
- Botanophila palgongsana
- Botanophila pamirensis
- Botanophila pamiricola
- Botanophila papiliocera
- Botanophila papilioformis
- Botanophila paraturcica
- Botanophila parvicornis
- Botanophila peltophora
- Botanophila peninsularis
- Botanophila pentachaeta
- Botanophila petrophila
- Botanophila phrenione
- Botanophila piloseta
- Botanophila pilosibucca
- Botanophila pinguilamella
- Botanophila platysurstyla
- Botanophila praefecta
- Botanophila prenochirella
- Botanophila profuga
- Botanophila prominens
- Botanophila prominula
- Botanophila protuberans
- Botanophila pseudomaculipes
- Botanophila pseudospinidens
- Botanophila puberalis
- Botanophila pulvinata
- Botanophila pulviventris
- Botanophila purpurea
- Botanophila qinghaisenecio
- Botanophila quinlani
- Botanophila recedens
- Botanophila rectangularis
- Botanophila relativa
- Botanophila retusa
- Botanophila ringdahli
- Botanophila robusta
- Botanophila rotundivalva
- Botanophila rubrifrons
- Botanophila rubrigena
- Botanophila rupicapra
- Botanophila salicis
- Botanophila salti
- Botanophila salutaris
- Botanophila sanctiforceps
- Botanophila sanctimarci
- Botanophila sansa
- Botanophila seneciella
- Botanophila sericea
- Botanophila setiforceps
- Botanophila setifrons
- Botanophila setisilva
- Botanophila seungmoi
- Botanophila shinonagai
- Botanophila shirozui
- Botanophila sichuanensis
- Botanophila silva
- Botanophila silvatica
- Botanophila sodalis
- Botanophila solidiceps
- Botanophila sonchi
- Botanophila sperata
- Botanophila spinidens
- Botanophila spinisternata
- Botanophila spiniventris
- Botanophila spinosa
- Botanophila spinulibasis
- Botanophila stenocerca
- Botanophila striolata
- Botanophila subnitida
- Botanophila subobscura
- Botanophila subquadrata
- Botanophila subspinata
- Botanophila subspinulibasis
- Botanophila suwai
- Botanophila testacea
- Botanophila tetracrula
- Botanophila tetraseta
- Botanophila tibetiana
- Botanophila trapezina
- Botanophila tridentifera
- Botanophila tridigitata
- Botanophila trifida
- Botanophila triforialis
- Botanophila trifurcata
- Botanophila trifurcatoides
- Botanophila trigemina
- Botanophila trigeminata
- Botanophila trilineata
- Botanophila trinivittata
- Botanophila trisetigonita
- Botanophila tristylata
- Botanophila trivittata
- Botanophila truncata
- Botanophila turcica
- Botanophila tuxeni
- Botanophila vallaris
- Botanophila varians
- Botanophila varicolor
- Botanophila velutina
- Botanophila verticella
- Botanophila vicaria
- Botanophila vicariola
- Botanophila vitticollis
- Botanophila zhuoniensis
