= Castle Rock National Wildlife Refuge =

Protected area in California, US

- IUCN category IV (habitat/species management area)
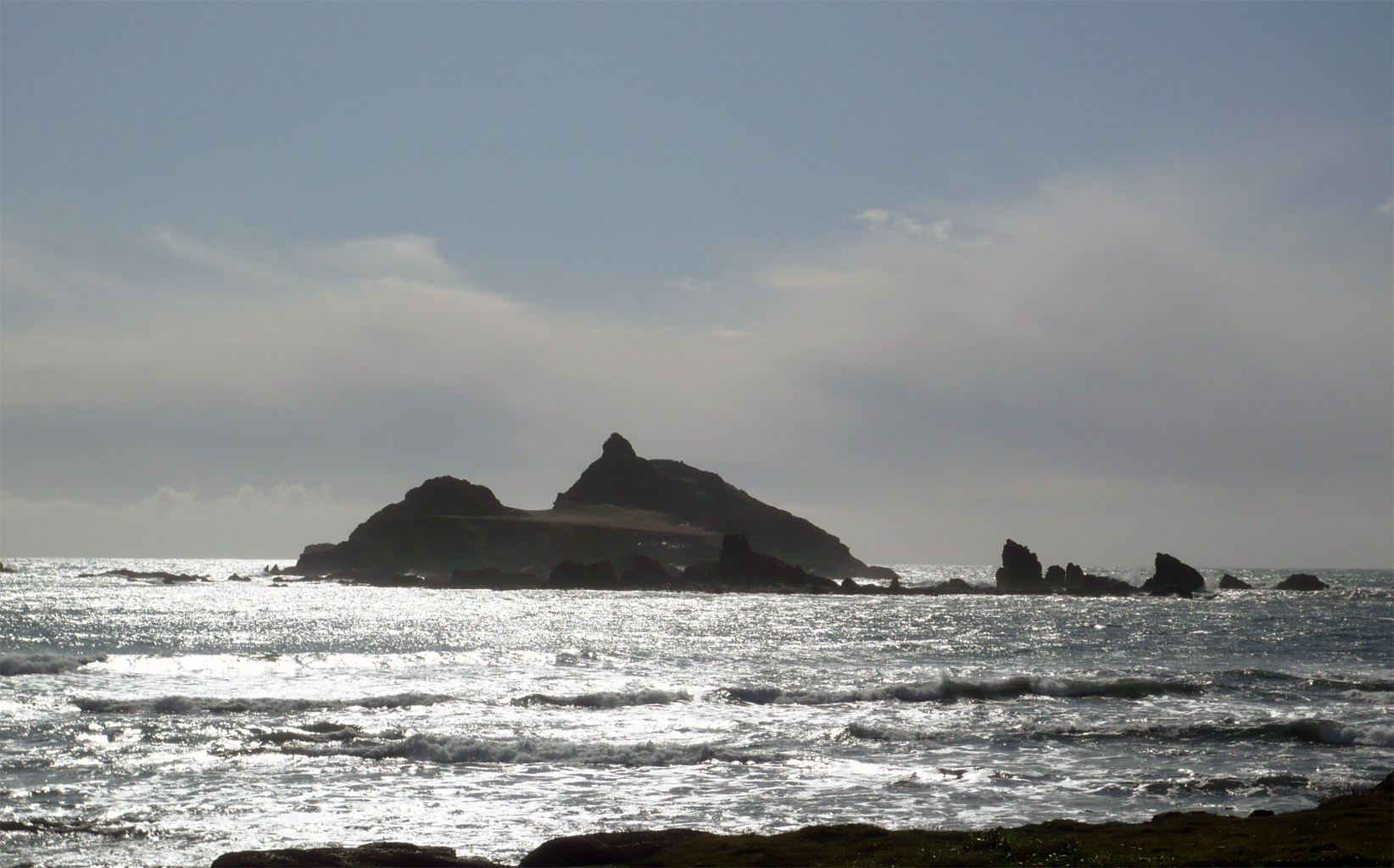
- Castle Rock

- Location within the United States
- Location: Del Norte County, California, United States
- Nearest city: Crescent City, California
- Coordinates: 41.76178°N 124.24952°W
- Area: 14 acres (0.057 km^{2})
- Established: 1979
- Governing body: U.S. Fish and Wildlife Service
- Website: Castle Rock National Wildlife Refuge

Castle Rock National Wildlife Refuge is 0.5 miles (0.80 km) offshore from Crescent City in northern California. This coastal rock covers approximately 14 acres (5.7 ha), and rises steeply 335 feet (102 m) above sea level. The refuge provides an important sanctuary for the Aleutian cackling goose and nesting seabirds.

== History ==
Tolowa people foraged on, but did not live on the island, their village sites were on the headlands near Castle Rock and towards Point St. George where the intertidal zone provided shellfish and seaweed.

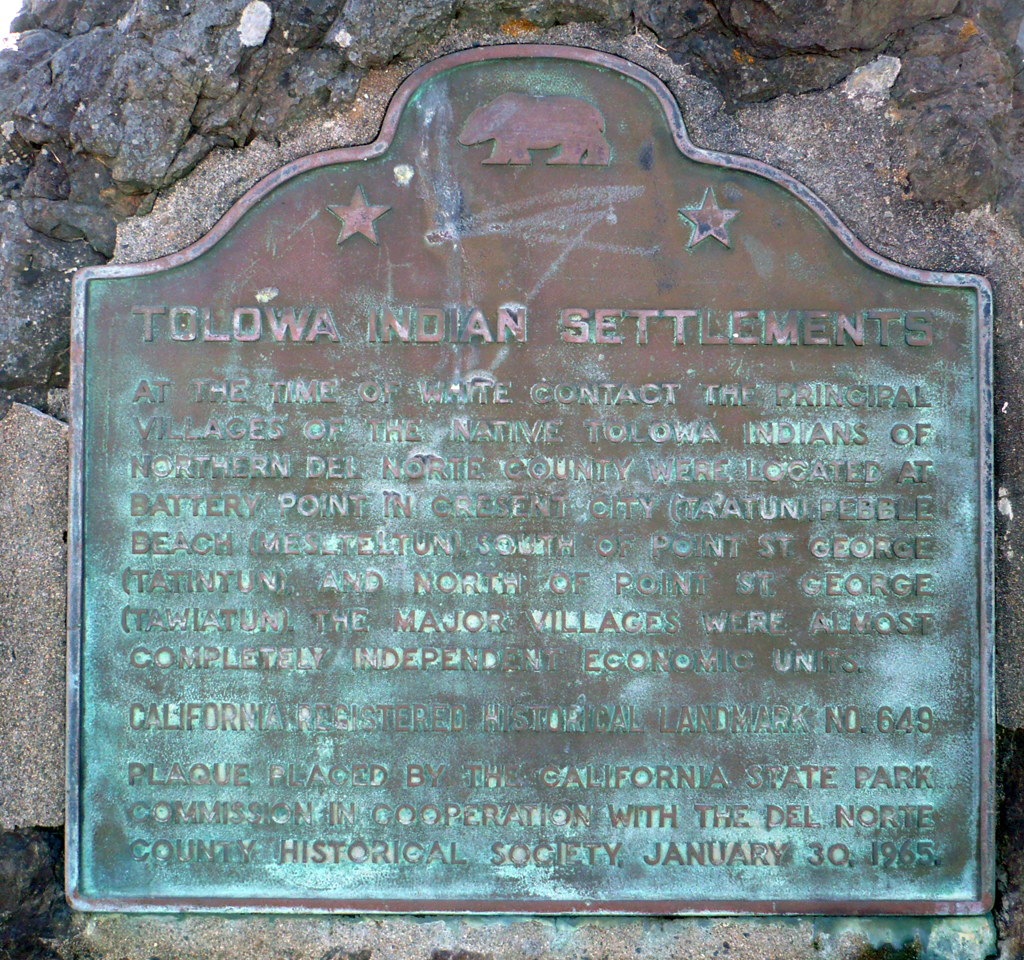
Tolowa Indian Settlements are California Registered Historical Landmark No. 649

The Tolowa hunted sea lions from 30 to 40 feet (9.1 to 12.2 m) long sea-going canoes at St. George Reef and Castle Rock. They also hunted and ate sea otters, sea lions, whales, harbor and fur seals as well as birds, eggs and juvenile birds with the most common midden bird bones being from immature cormorants. In May, men would collect eggs to be eaten as well as blown empty and used to make decorative garlands. There are no known archaeological sites on the island.

White settlement in 1850 was followed by decimation of natives; only about 300 were still alive six years later. The island was claimed by the U.S. Government at the end of the 1800s, but from 1900 to 1920, it was being grazed by a private sheepherder with a cabin constructed for his use. Egg collectors and oologists visited from around 1917 to the 1960s. Private owners who planned to quarry rock for harbors and jetties bought Castle Rock from the U.S. Government in 1937. They also considered mining guano or building a tourist attraction on the island.

The island was proposed for protection following the rediscovery of the Aleutian cackling goose, which was thought to be extinct but was found to be using the island in the spring of 1975. At that time, the entire population of the species used the areas as a spring staging ground for their northward migrations. Castle Rock remained in private ownership until 1979, when the United States Fish and Wildlife Service purchased it from The Nature Conservancy to conserve habitat for marine mammals and seabirds.

Castle Rock refuge is not open to the public to prevent disturbance to the marine mammals and sea birds. It may be viewed, and birds seen with spotting scope from the interpretive panel overlook on Pebble Beach Drive south of Washington Boulevard in Crescent City, California.

Castle Rock Refuge is managed as a component of the Humboldt Bay National Wildlife Refuge Complex from headquarters in Loleta, California (located south of Eureka).

== Geology ==
Castle Rock is assigned to be part of the Franciscan Assemblage with a base of pillow basalt rising 200 feet (61 m) on the west while the eastern end is composed of shale and greywacke. Late Pleistocene soil and a sandy subsoils up to 25 feet (7.6 m) are present on flatter areas, covered by a dark humus which can range to 12 inches (0.30 m) thick.

Wave erosion of north to south trending faults have produced large sea caves on the south side of the island, and the 100 feet (30 m) "pit" on the eastern side is not a product of quarrying but was created when a fault collapsed connecting to the ocean under an arch of remaining land. Prevailing ocean currents flow from north to south and prevailing winds from the northwest.

== Wildlife ==
Castle Rock is the second largest nesting seabird colony south of Alaska (after the Farallon Islands), is a nationally significant sea bird colony and one of only two island National Wildlife Refuges in offshore California; the other is Southeast Farallon Island. As many as 150,000 seabirds are estimated to use Castle Rock, which has the largest breeding population of common murres on the Pacific Coast, with population estimates ranging as high as 100,000 for just this one species.

Eleven species of seabirds, one shorebird (the black oystercatcher) and two pinnipeds are documented to breed on Castle Rock. Castle Rock is the northernmost breeding colony of northern elephant seals, which like harbor seals breed on the island; California sea lions and Steller sea lions use the island as a haul-out but do not breed there.

Harbor porpoises and gray whales are the most common cetaceans year round, with most sightings of the gray whales during their migration when they feed around Castle Rock.

Mostly nocturnal, burrow and crevice nesting sea birds including tufted puffins, fork-tailed storm petrels, and Leach's storm petrels, Cassin's auklets, rhinoceros auklets, double-crested cormorant, Brandt's cormorant, pelagic cormorant and pigeon guillemots avoid predation by the diurnal western gulls which also breed on the island. April and May are prime months to see tufted puffins on the island. Peregrine falcons used to breed on the site but have not been documented since the 1940s. U.S. Endangered Species Act protected brown pelicans use the island as a communal roost but do not breed north of Monterey, California. Over 21,000 Aleutian cackling geese roost on the island, flying at dawn to feed on nearby agricultural lands and returning to the island in the evening.
