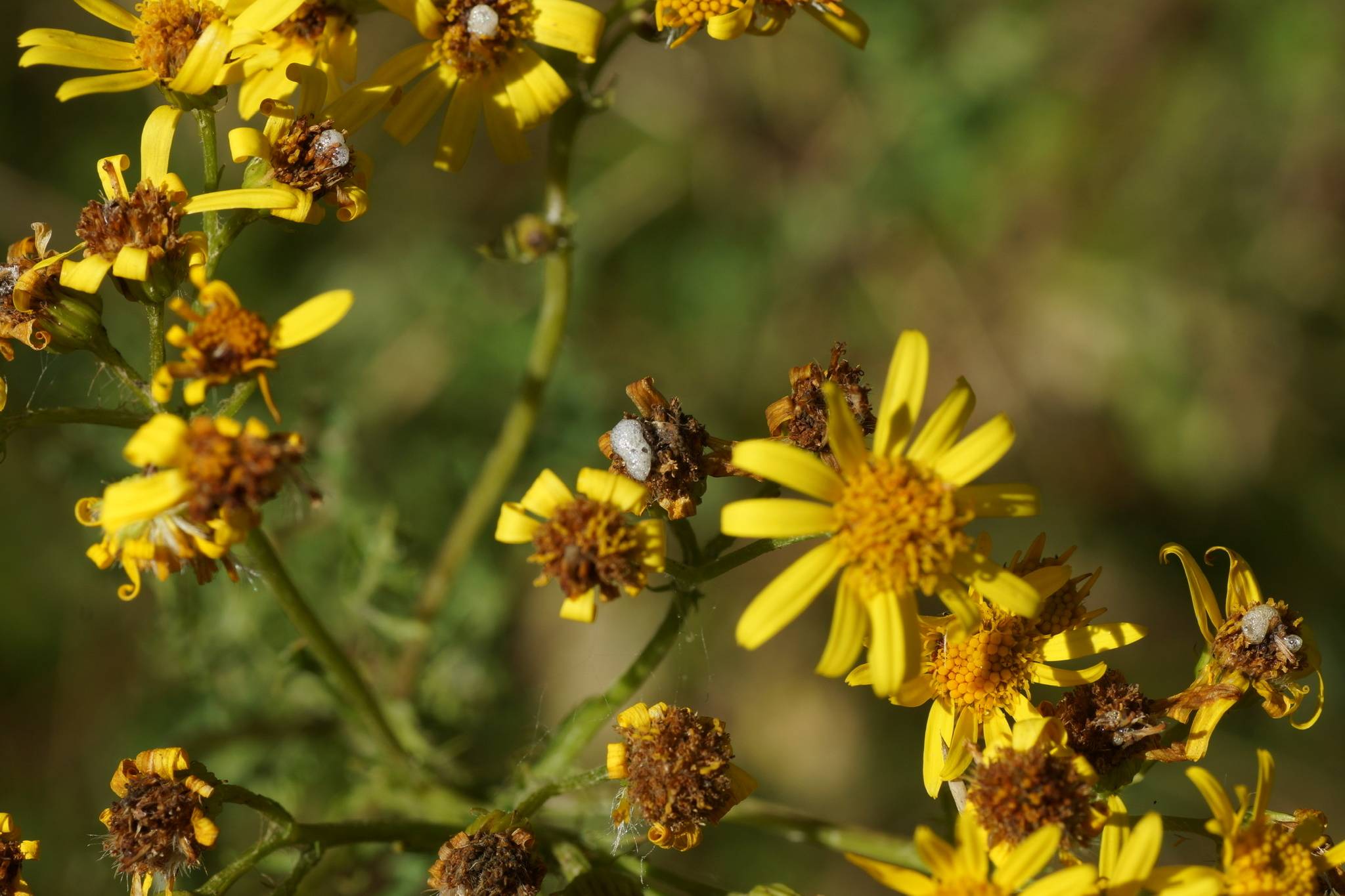
- Botanophila seneciella on Jacobaea vulgaris in Kystvej, Storvorde, North Jutland, Denmark

Scientific classification
- Kingdom: Animalia
- Phylum: Arthropoda
- Class: Insecta
- Order: Diptera
- Family: Anthomyiidae
- Genus: Botanophila
- Species: B. seneciella

Binomial name
- Botanophila seneciella (Meade, 1892)

Synonyms
- Hylemya seneciella; Pegohylemyia seneciella

= Botanophila seneciella =

Species of fly

Botanophila seneciella, the ragwort seed fly or ragwort seed head fly, is a fly species in the family Anthomyiidae.

Larvae feed within seed heads of Jacobaea vulgaris (the tansy ragwort), often destroying all of the developing seeds. It is also found feeding on Senecio vulgaris (the groundsel).

These flies originated in France. Together with the cinnabar moth (Tyria jacobaeae) and the tansy ragwort flea beetle (Longitarsus jacobaeae), the ragwort seed fly can be used for the biological control of the tansy ragwort. It has been approved and released for Senecio control in California, Australia and elsewhere.
