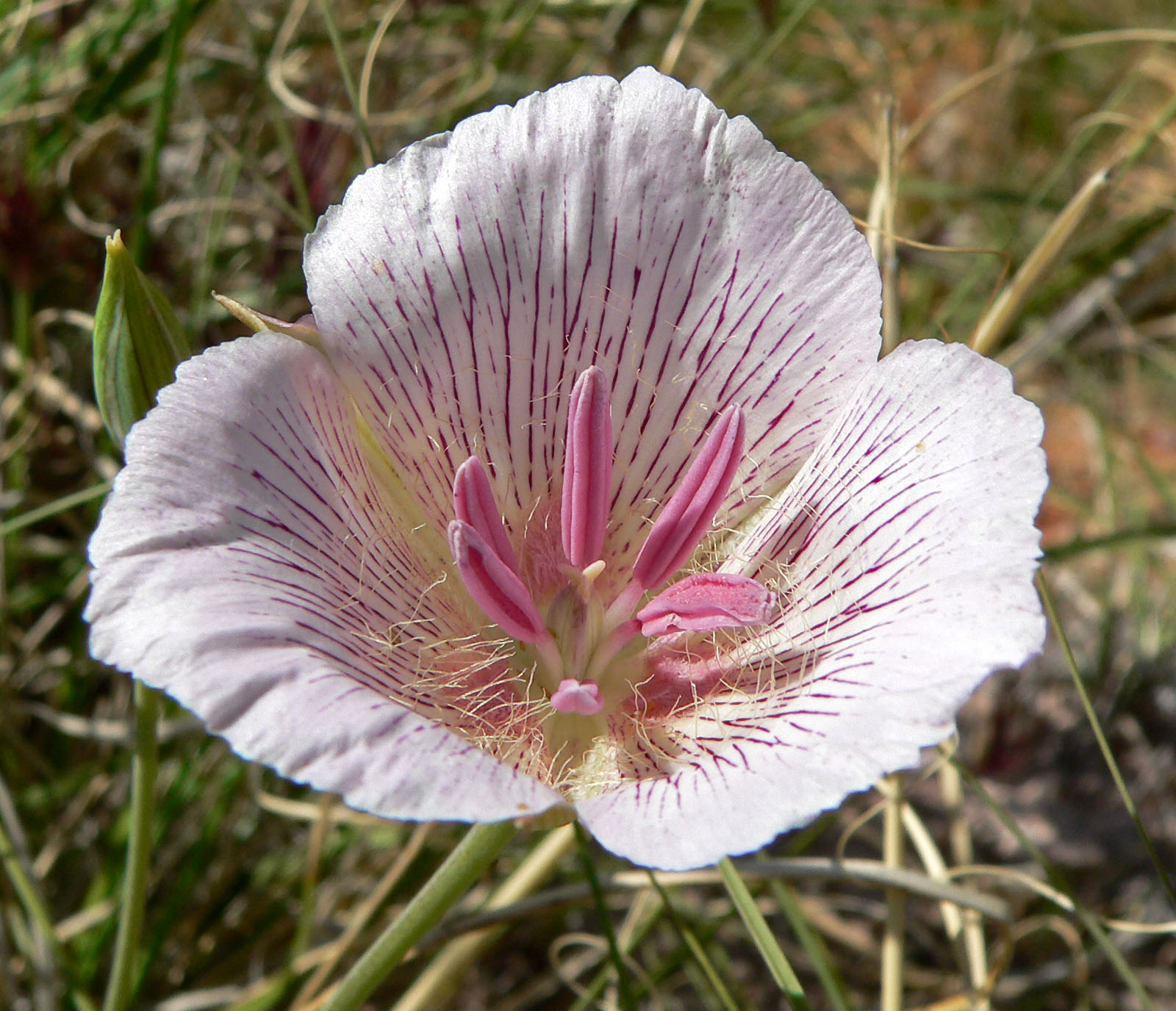

Conservation status
- Vulnerable (NatureServe)

Scientific classification
- Kingdom: Plantae
- Clade: Tracheophytes
- Clade: Angiosperms
- Clade: Monocots
- Order: Liliales
- Family: Liliaceae
- Genus: Calochortus
- Species: C. striatus

Binomial name
- Calochortus striatus Parish

Synonyms
- Calochortus comosus A.Nelson

= Calochortus striatus =

Species of flowering plant

Calochortus striatus, known by the common name alkali mariposa lily, is a species of mariposa lily native to California and into Nevada.

It is a vulnerable species on the California Native Plant Society Inventory of Rare and Endangered Plants.

== Distribution ==
It is primarily native to the Mojave Desert including its Antelope Valley region, and also has populations in the Kern River Valley and adjacent southern Sierra Nevada, Amargosa Desert, Owens Valley, Yosemite Valley, and eastern Transverse Ranges. This is a plant of alkaline soils, usually in wetland-riparian areas, in Shadscale scrub and chaparral habitats.

== Description ==
Calochortus striatus erects a stem usually only a few centimeters tall but sometimes quite a bit taller, and a long basal leaf which may lie flat on the ground.

At least halfway up the stem it may branch, and atop each branch is a bell-shaped lily bloom. Pointed sepals form the base of the flower and above are three rounded petals, which may be slightly toothed and 2−3 centimeters long. The petals are very light to very dark pink, lilac, or purplish with darker pink or purple veining or mottling. The cup of the flower is somewhat hairy. The anthers are bright to dull pink, with pink pollen. The bulb blooms from April to June.

The capsule fruit is up to 5 centimeters long, producing flat seeds.

== See also ==
- Fish Slough Area of Critical Environmental Concern — habitat in the Owens Valley, Inyo County, California
