= Fish Slough Area of Critical Environmental Concern =

Coordinates: 37°28′09″N 118°24′03″W

The Fish Slough Area of Critical Environmental Concern is a protected slough in Inyo County, eastern California. It is located on the western side of the Chalfant Valley, 5 miles (8.0 km) north of Bishop in the northern Owens Valley area.

Its 36,000 acres (15,000 ha) were designated as an Area of Critical Environmental Concern (ACEC) in 1982, and is managed by the Bureau of Land Management. The Fish Slough Area is an oasis in the middle of the otherwise arid volcanic tableland. In 1975, Fish Slough was designated as a National Natural Landmark by the National Park Service.

== Plants and biomes ==
The Fish Slough ACEC is located in the transition zone (ecotone) between the Mojave Desert and Great Basin biomes. Plant communities including wetlands, alkali meadows, and uplands.

One plant, Fish Slough milk vetch (Astragalus lentiginosus var. piscinensis), is endemic to the area. The Alkali Mariposa lily (Calochortus striatus) is also a rare plant found in the ACEC, and is a vulnerable species on the California Native Plant Society Inventory of Rare and Endangered Plants.

== See also ==
- Owens Valley topics
- National Landscape Conservation System
