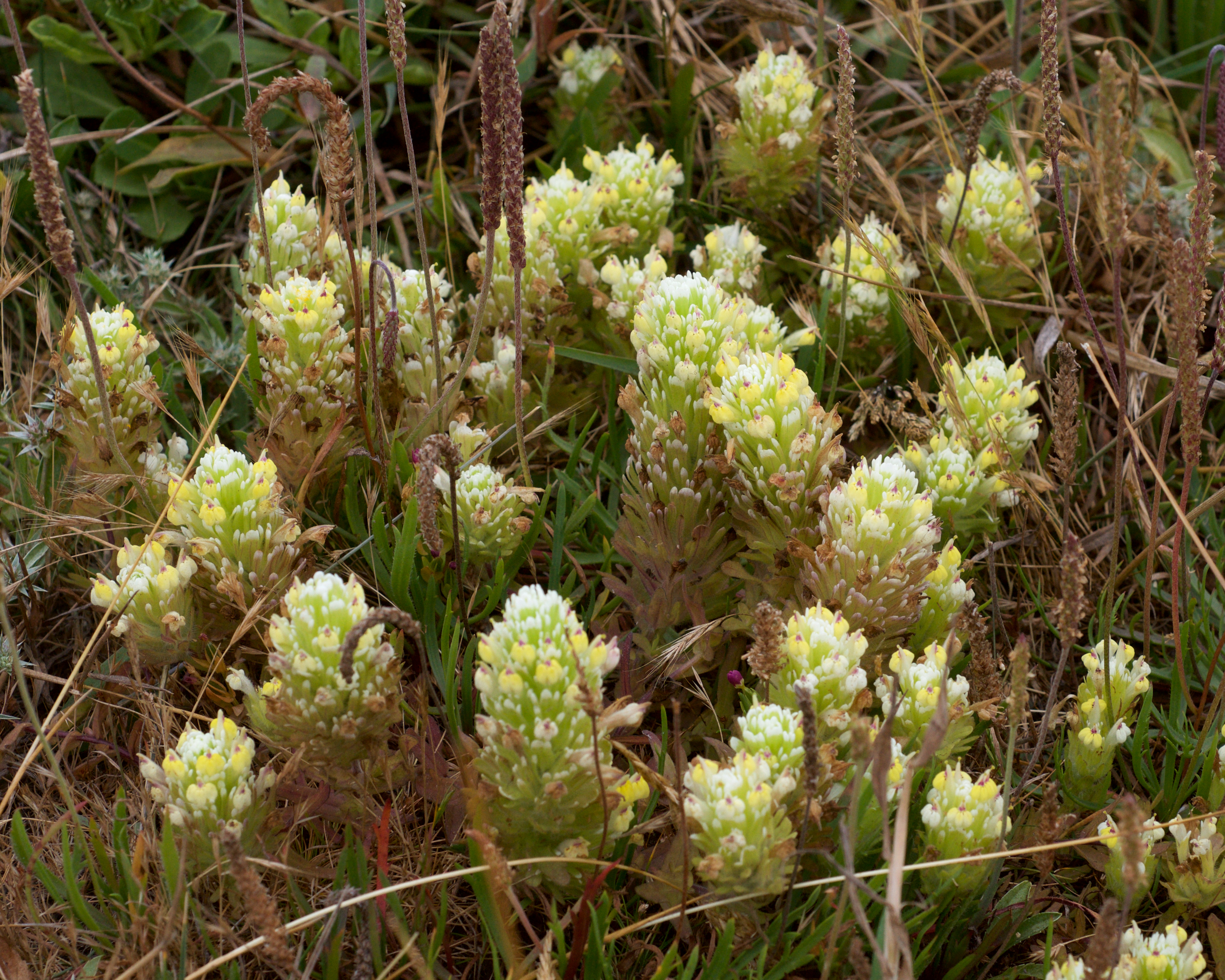

Scientific classification
- Kingdom: Plantae
- Clade: Tracheophytes
- Clade: Angiosperms
- Clade: Eudicots
- Clade: Asterids
- Order: Lamiales
- Family: Orobanchaceae
- Genus: Castilleja
- Species: C. ambigua

Binomial name
- Castilleja ambigua Hook. & Arn.

Synonyms
- Orthocarpus castillejoides

= Castilleja ambigua =

Species of flowering plant

Castilleja ambigua is a species of Indian paintbrush known by the common name Johnny-nip. It is native to western part of North America from British Columbia to California, where its commonly found growing along the salt marshes and scrubs of the coast.

== Description ==
This is a highly variable annual herb growing to a maximum height of about 30 centimeters. The leaves are 1 to 5 centimeters long which could be lobed or not. The inflorescence is up to 12 centimeters in length and a few in width. It is packed with bracts that have white to light purple ridged tips. Between the bracts emerge the lobed flowers, which could be yellow, light purple or rose in color. Its fruit comes in a capsule shape with about a centimeter length.

== Subspecies ==
There are three subspecies, two of which are endemic to California.

The Humboldt Bay owl's clover, Castilleja ambigua ssp. humboldtiensis, is considered a threatened plant in Northern California.

There are also five infraspecies: var. ambigua, var. heckardii, var. humboldtiensis, var. insalutata, and var. meadii.
