= Lake Shasta Caverns =

Network of caves in California, United States

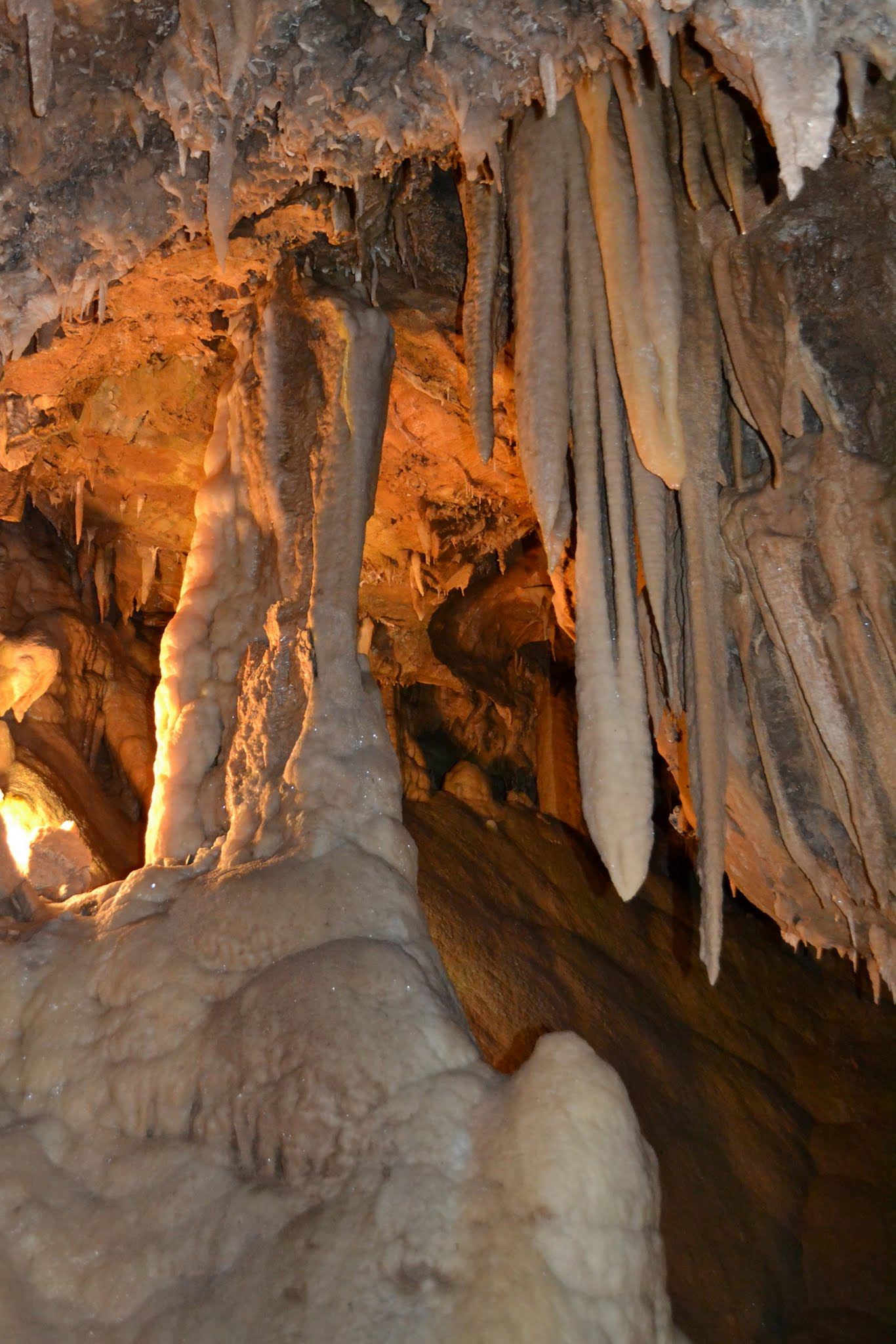
- A merged stalactite and stalagmite in the Lake Shasta Caverns.

- Location within California Location within the United States
- Location: Shasta County, California
- Coordinates: 40°48′16″N 122°18′16″W
- Area: 37 acres (15 ha)
- Website: Official website

U.S. National Natural Landmark
- Designated: 2012

The Lake Shasta Caverns are a network of caves located near the McCloud arm of Shasta Lake in California. It was formerly named Chalk Cave and Baird Cave, named after Spencer Fullerton Baird.

== History ==
The caverns are dated to at least 200 million years, and were formed by flowing water. Over the years this water drained leaving the caverns seen today. The caves are made entirely of limestone and feature a wide variety of formations, including stalactites, stalagmites, soda straws, columns, and flowstone. The Discovery Room, one of eight known rooms in the cavern system, contains all types of limestone rock formation. The first recorded explorer was James A. Richardson, a federal fisheries employee. His claim of discovery is still clearly legible on the wall where he wrote it that day – November 11, 1878 – with carbide from his miner's lamp.

Until 1964, Lake Shasta Caverns were seen each year by only a handful of hardy spelunkers who inched their way through steep, restricted natural fissures to view its startling formations. Before opening to the public, a new entrance was needed, as the current was a small hole in the ceiling, barely large enough for one person to fit through. Using explosives, workers blasted a tunnel from a rock face deep into the mountain, hoping to reach the lowest known room, the Basement. However, along the way, a large rock wall was knocked down, revealing the Discovery Room, perhaps the most fascinating room in the caverns. As a result of this, the Basement Room is not the lowest room. The idea of preserving this natural phenomenon first came to Grace M. Tucker, an attorney from Chehalis, Washington. In 1955, she obtained sole ownership of the caves. In 1959, Mrs. Tucker, along with Roy Thompson and his two brothers, formed Lake Shasta Properties, Inc. The site was declared a National Natural Landmark in May 2012.

The Lake Shasta Caverns currently attract thousands of visitors every year. The only transportation to the caverns from the visitor center is a short ride on a catamaran across Shasta Lake, followed by a scenic bus ride up a steep mountain grade. The bus ride terminates at the cavern entrance.

== Gallery ==
Stalagmites, stalactites, and flowstone in the Lake Shasta Caverns.

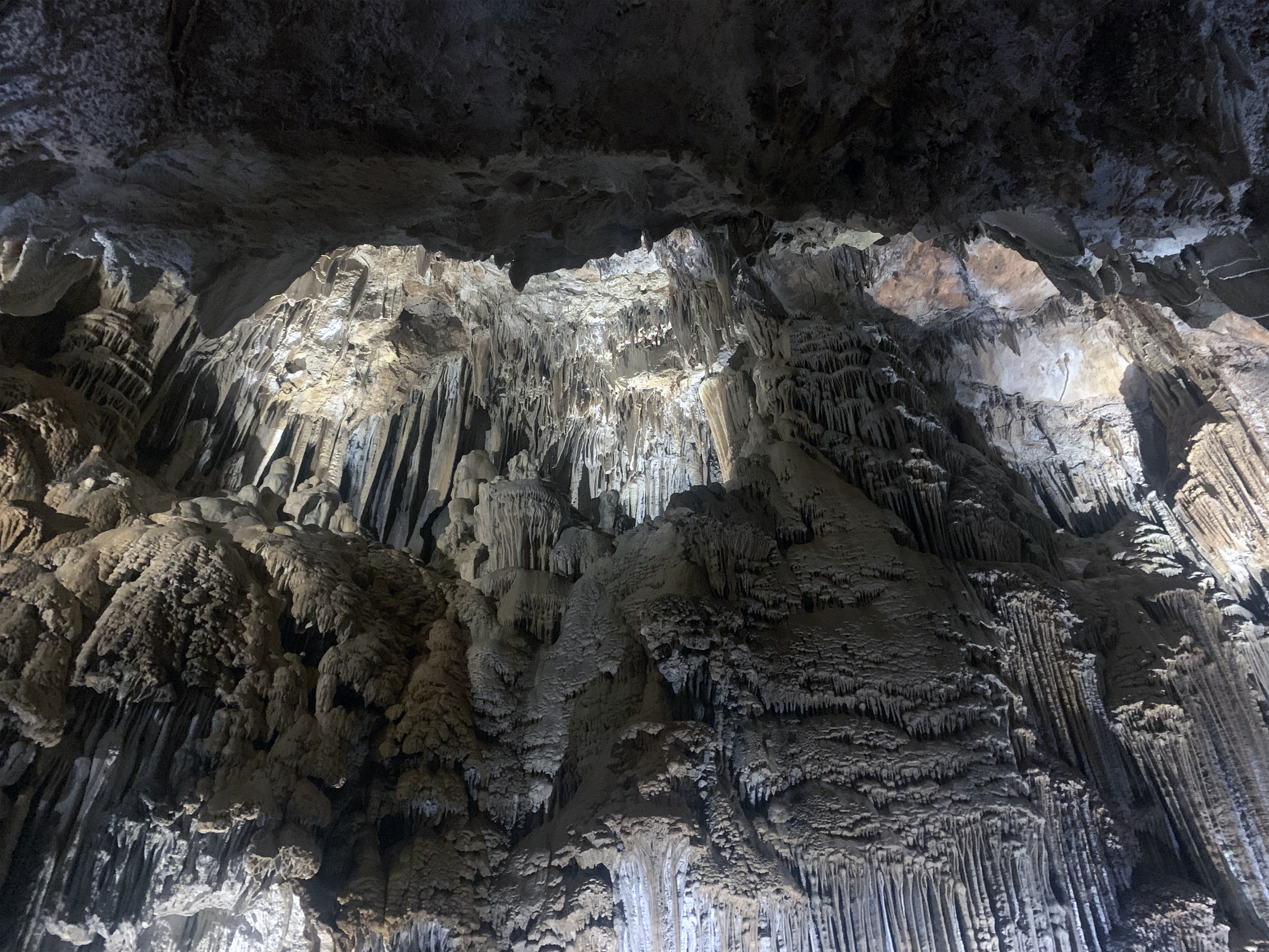

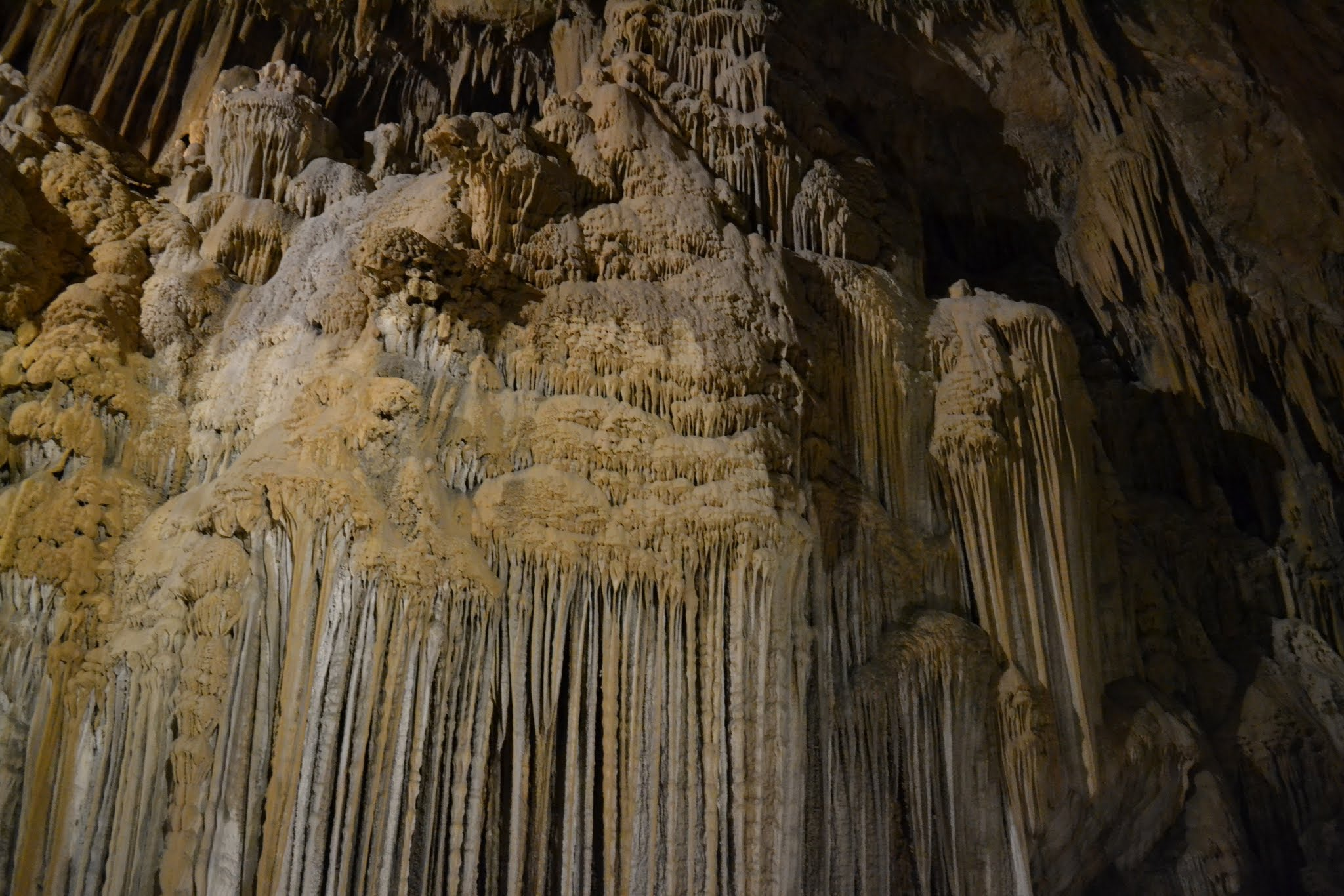

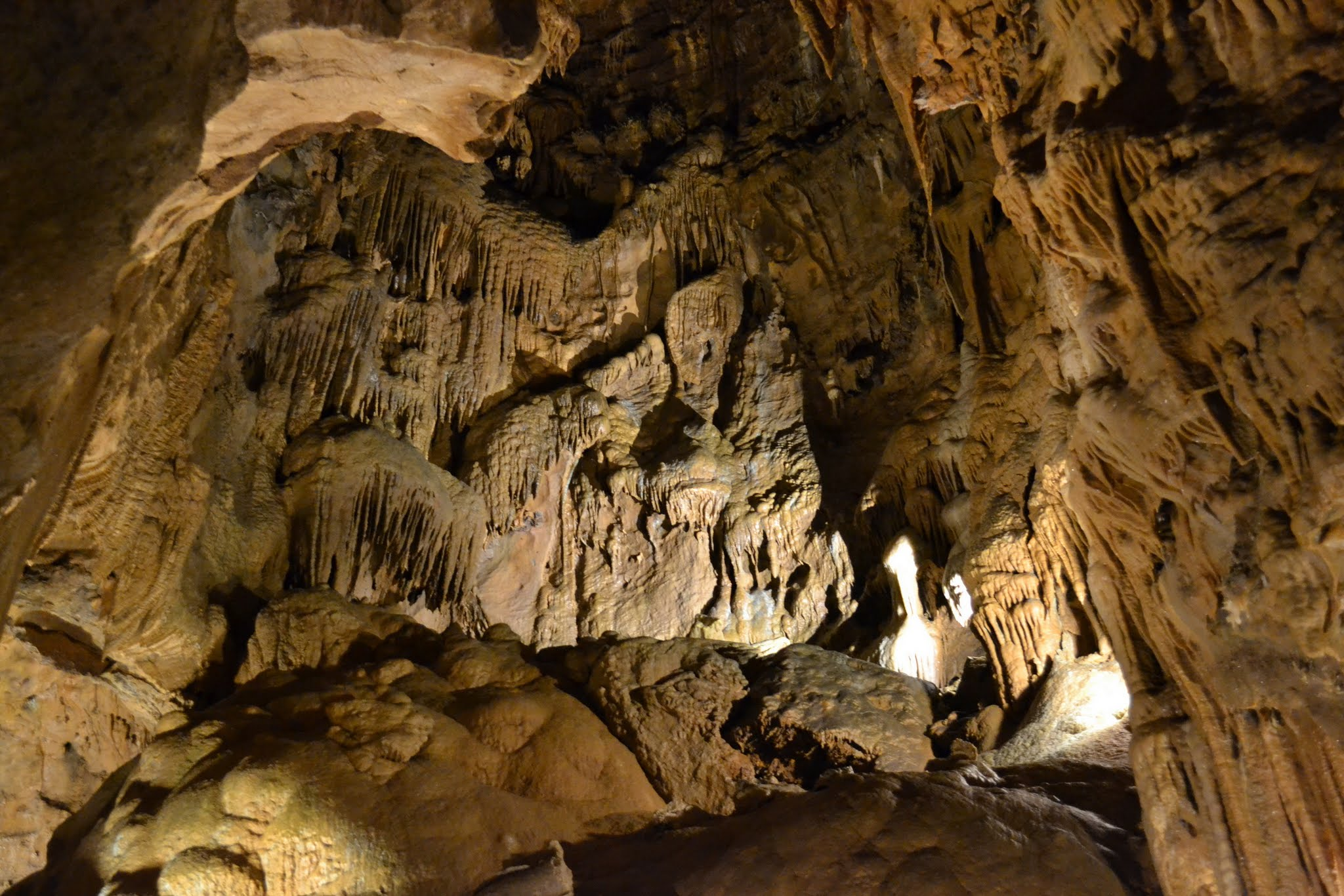

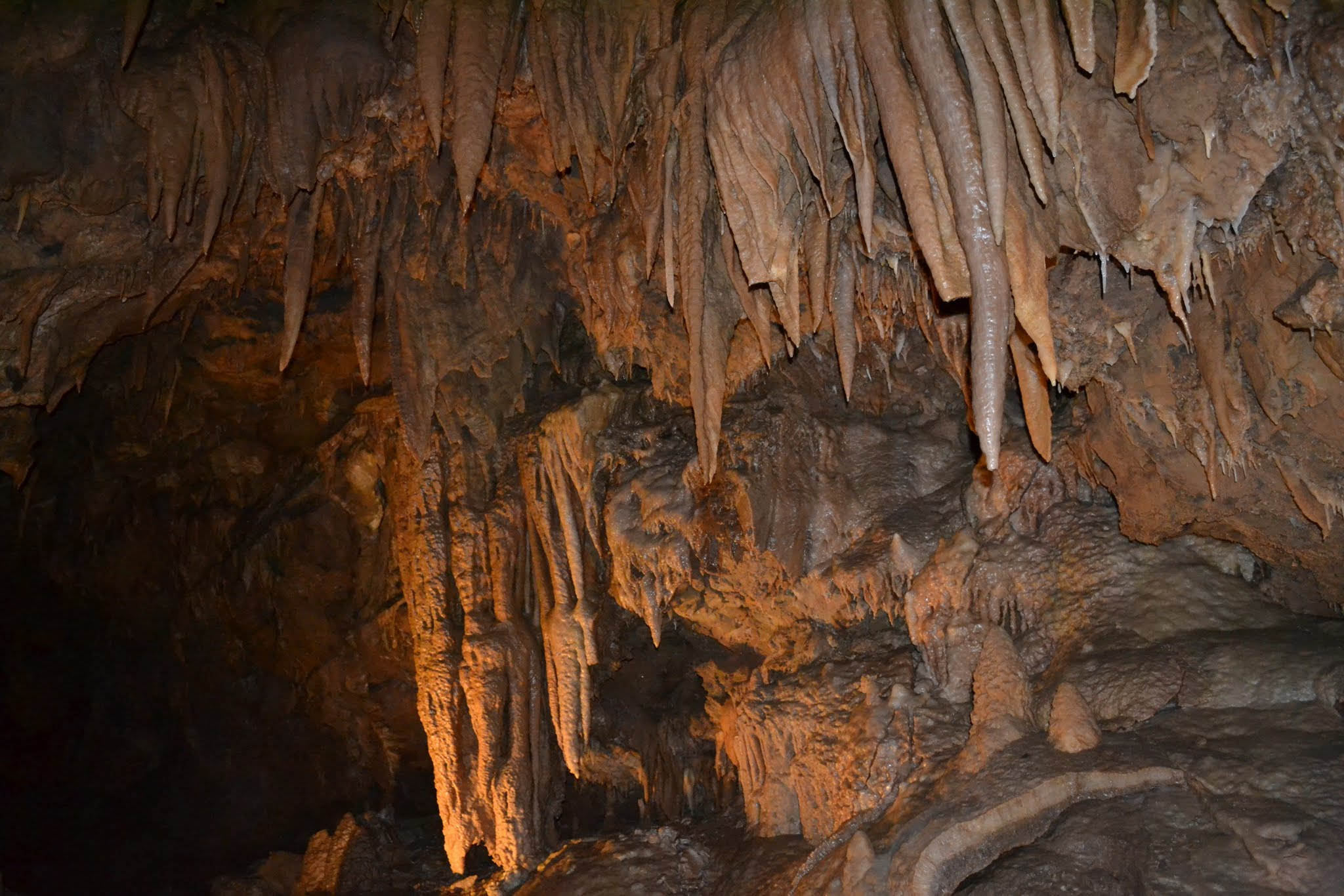

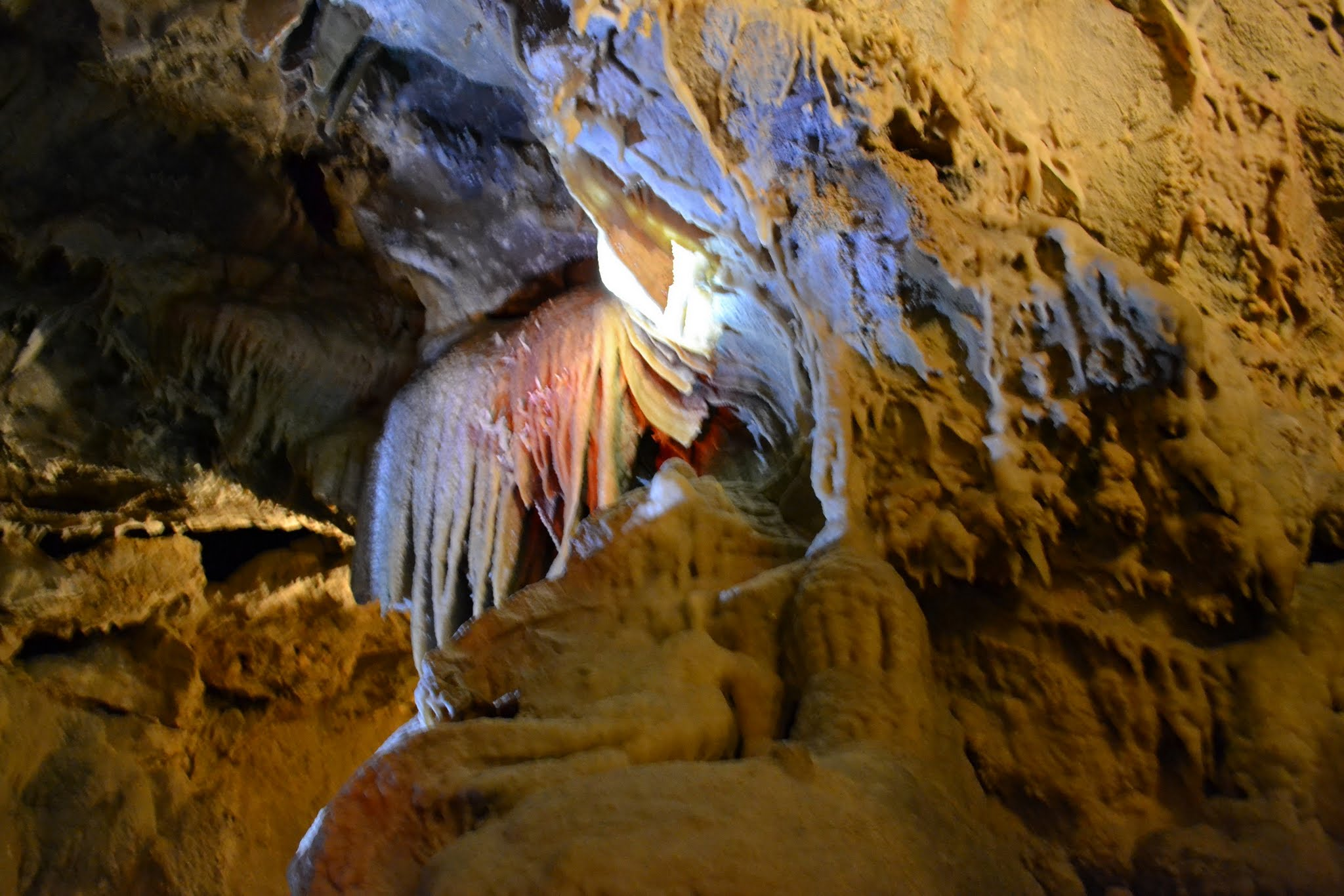

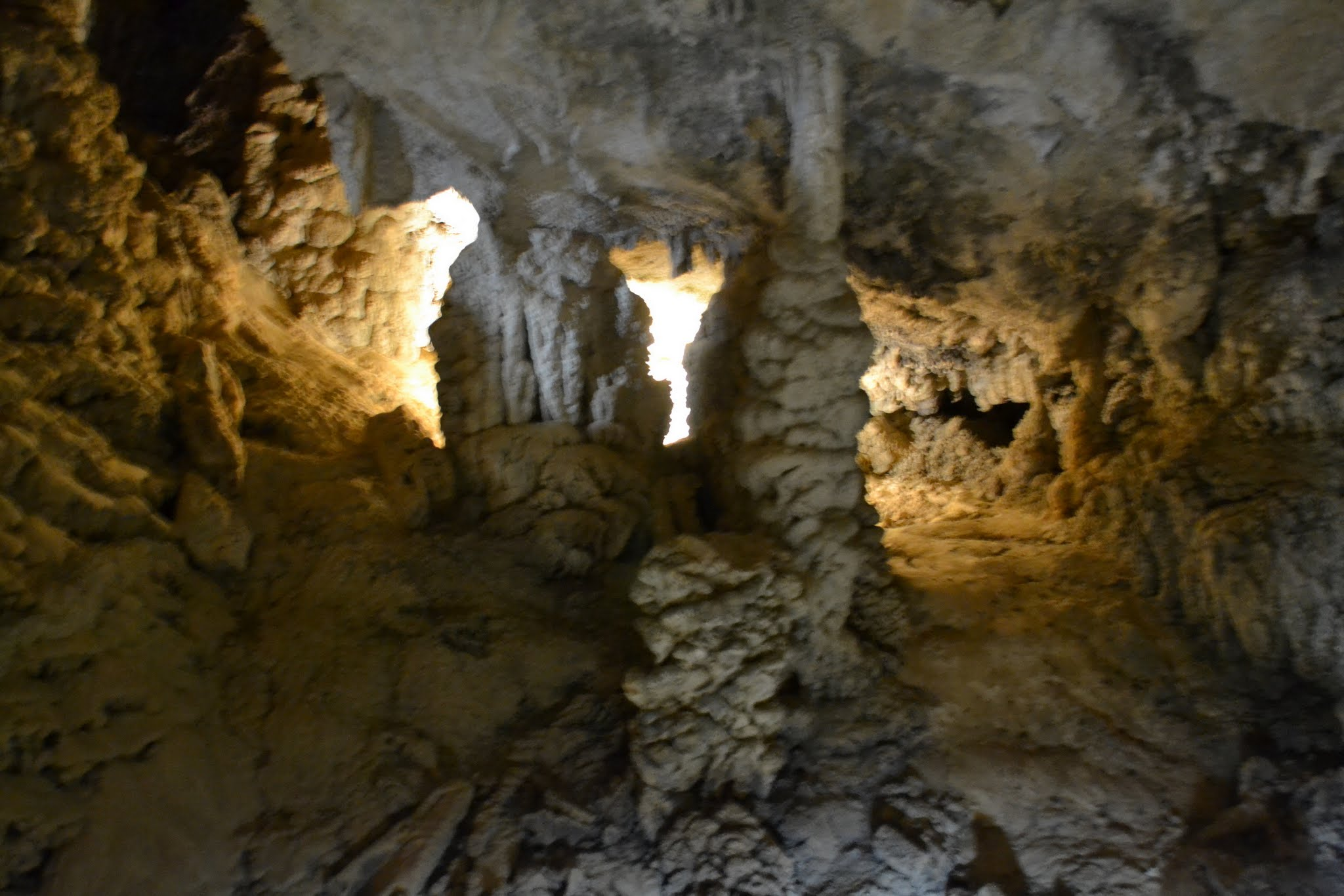

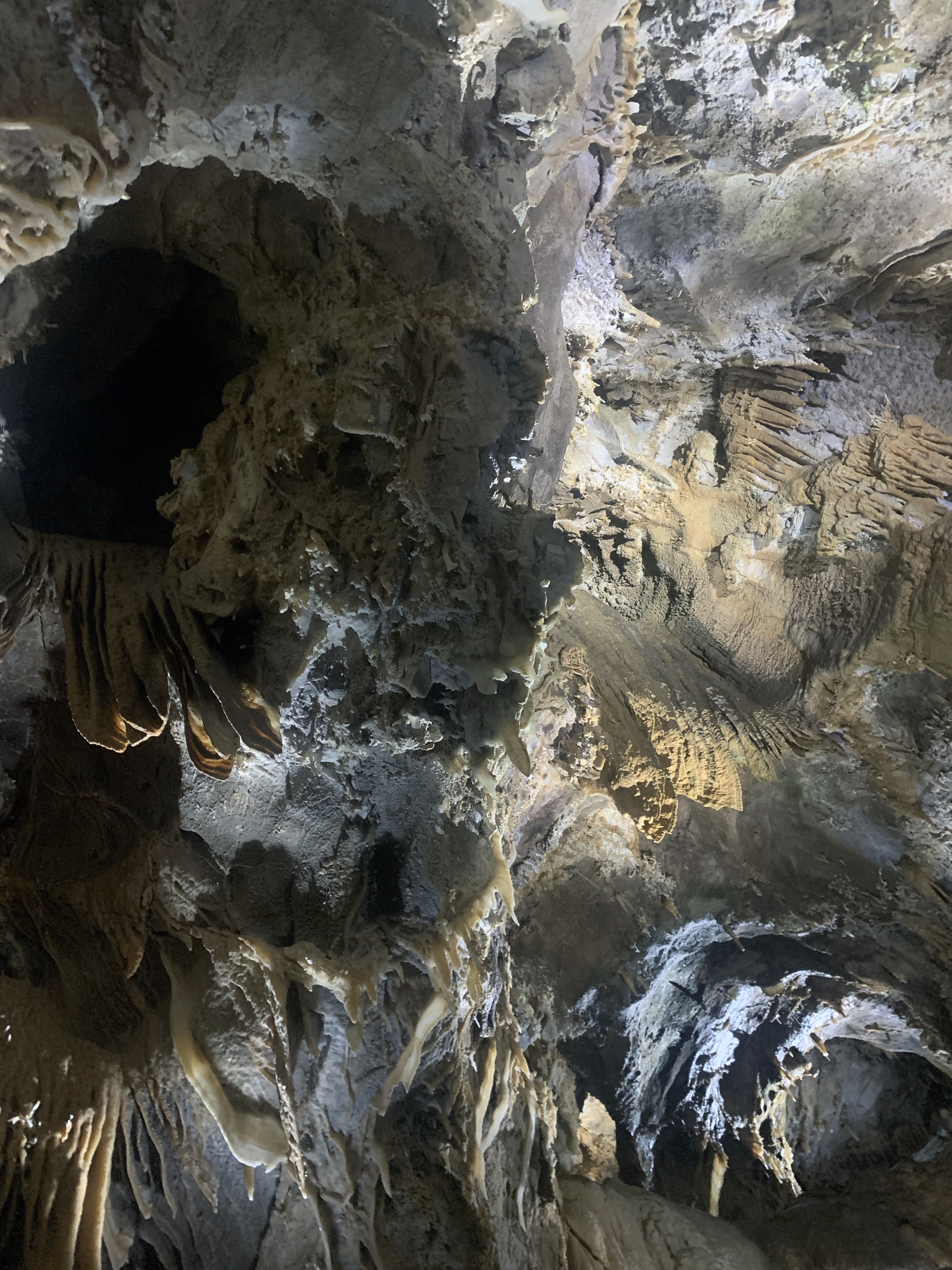

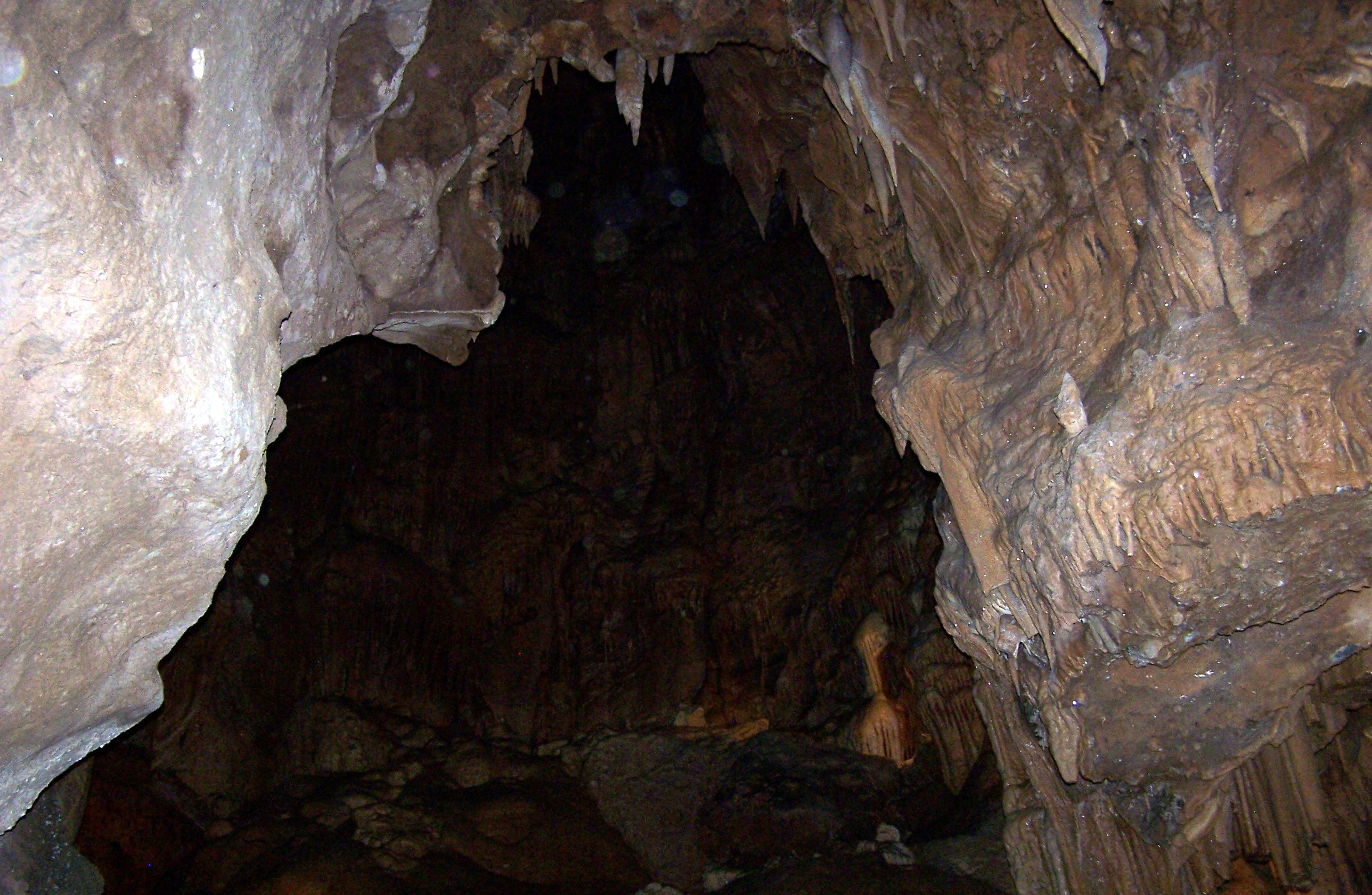
Views on the caverns tour

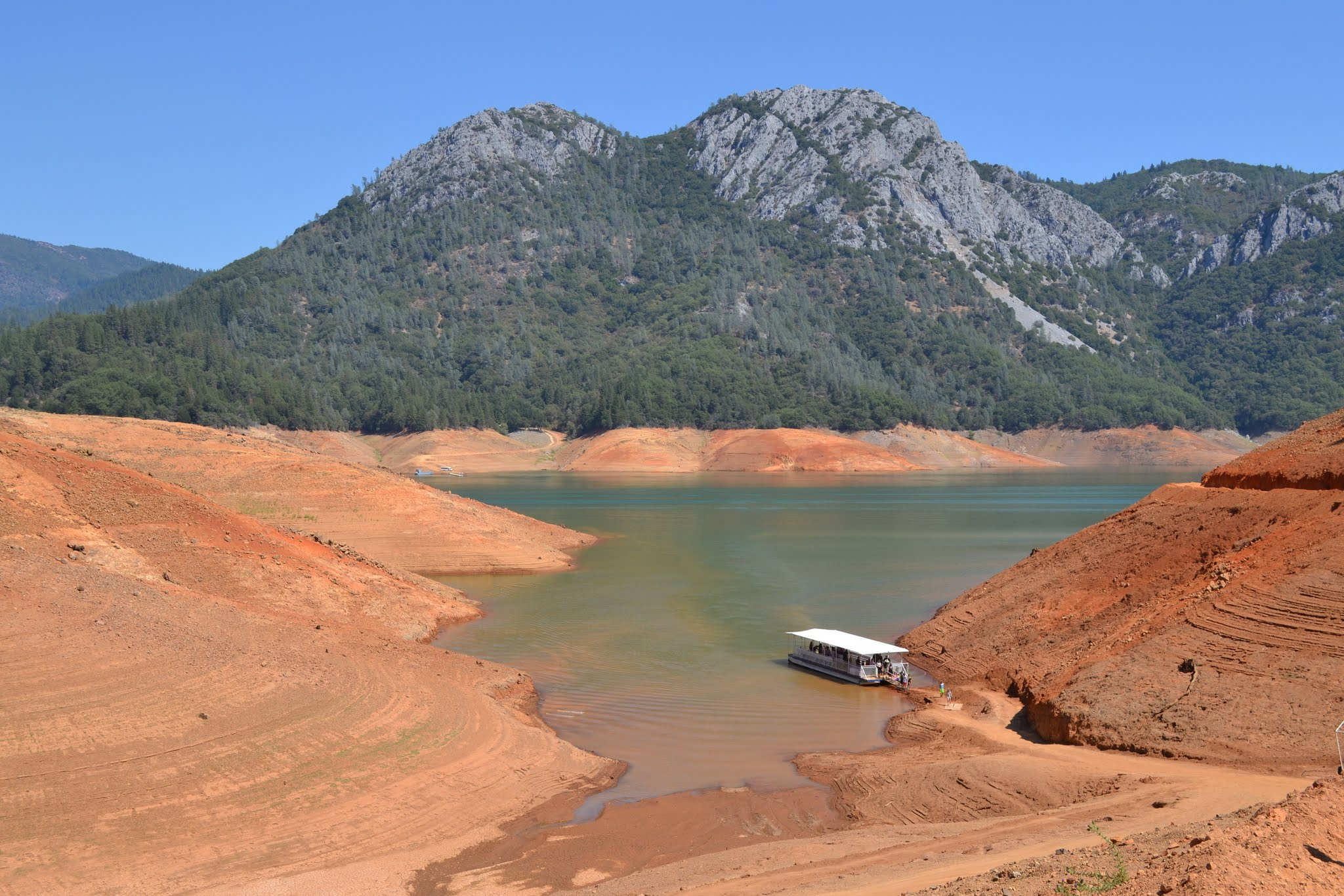
The boat that goes across Shasta Lake to Shasta Caverns.

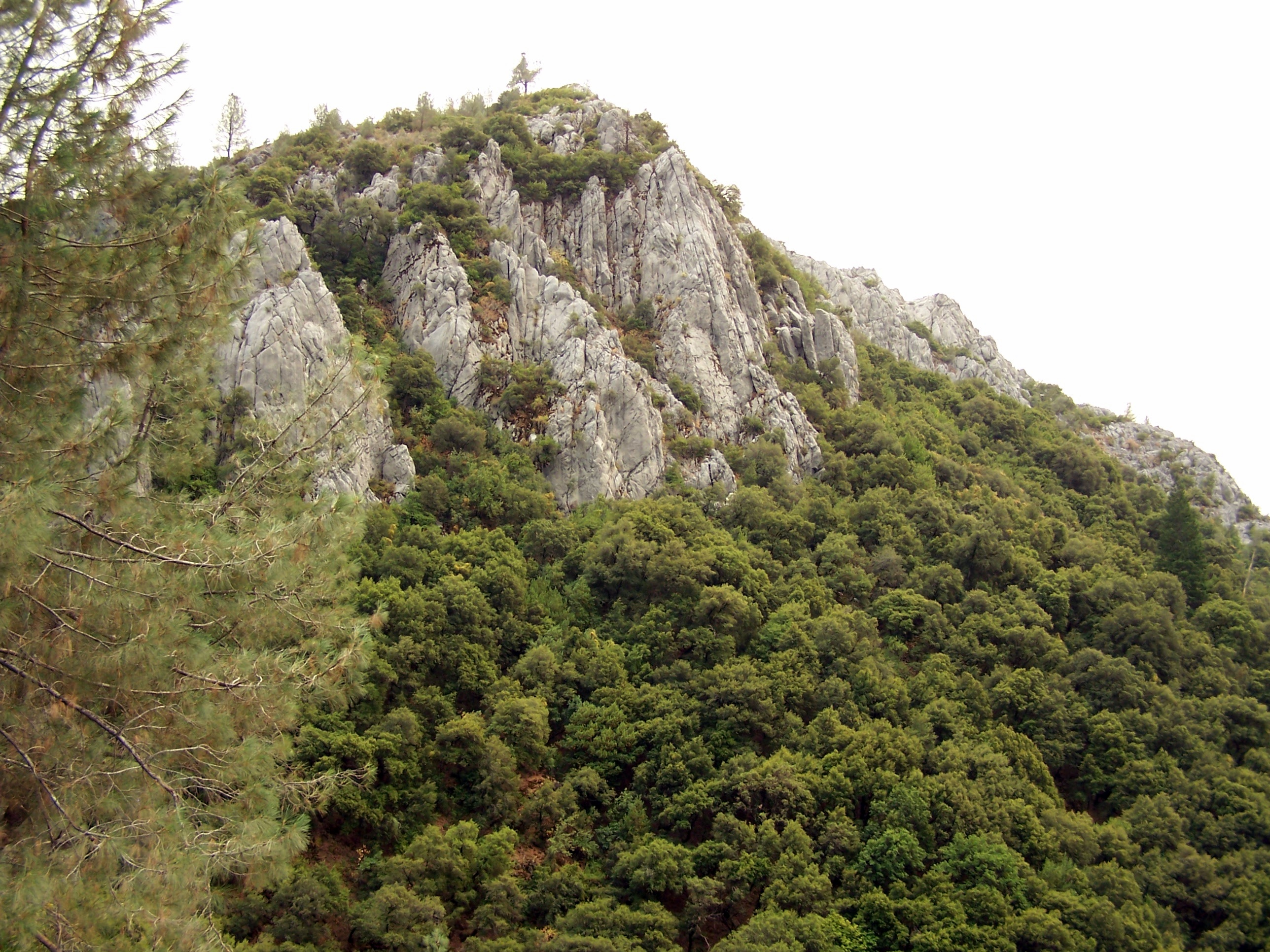
The mountain visible as you walk down to the visitor center from the cave exit.
