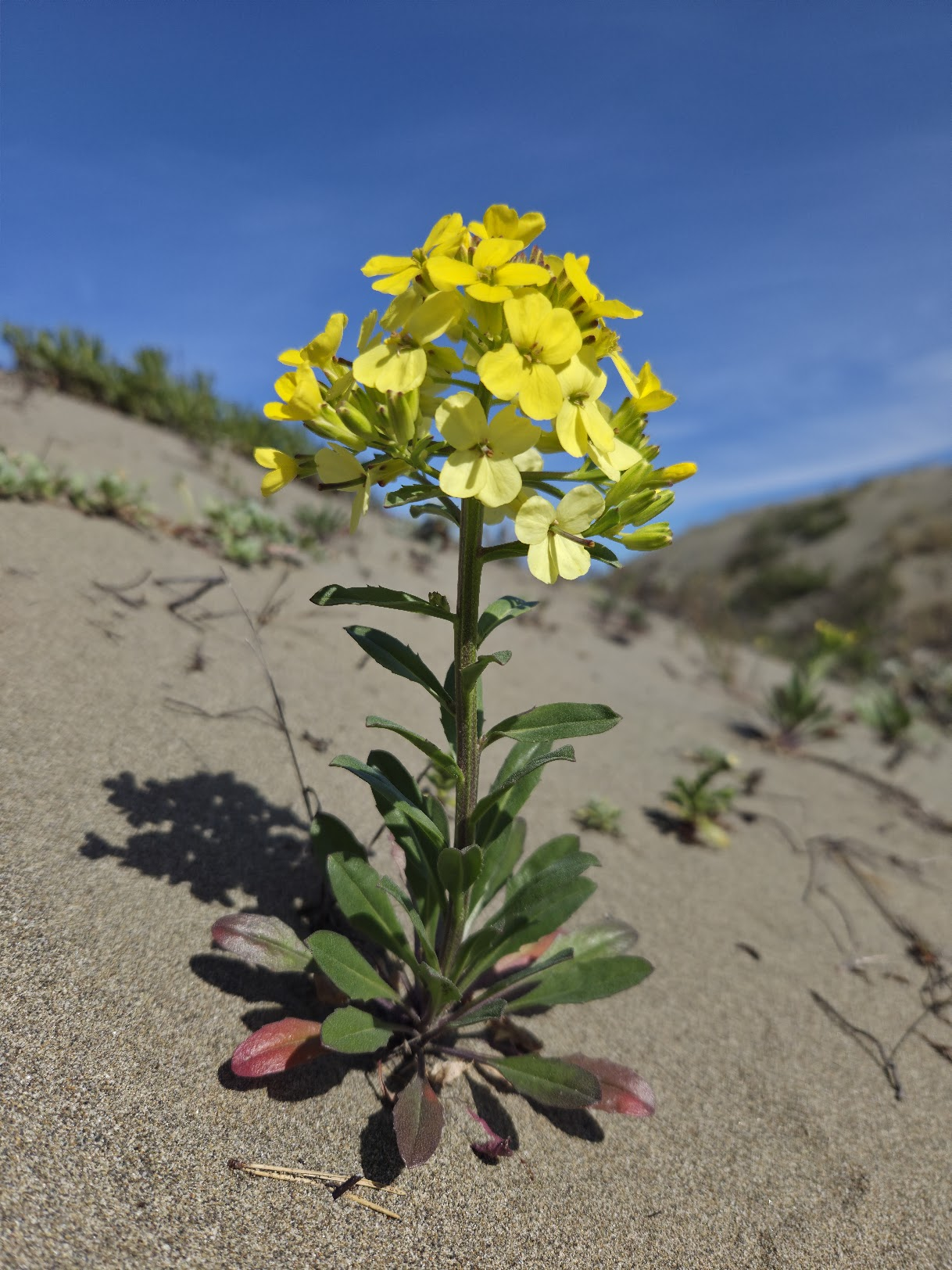
- subsp. eurekense

Conservation status
- Critically Imperiled (NatureServe)

Scientific classification
- Kingdom: Plantae
- Clade: Tracheophytes
- Clade: Angiosperms
- Clade: Eudicots
- Clade: Rosids
- Order: Brassicales
- Family: Brassicaceae
- Genus: Erysimum
- Species: E. menziesii

Binomial name
- Erysimum menziesii (Hook.) Wettst.

= Erysimum menziesii =

Species of flowering plant

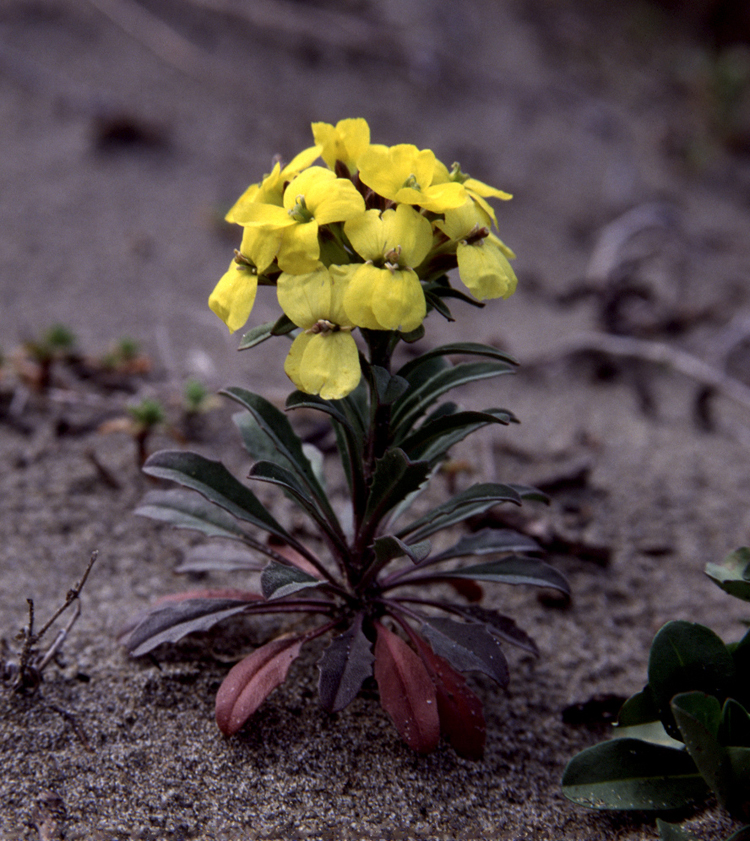
ssp. eurekense

Erysimum menziesii is a species of Erysimum known by the common name Menzies' wallflower.

This rare plant is endemic to California. It is found only in the declining beach sand dune habitat in three areas on the California coastline, in Humboldt, Mendocino, and Monterey Counties. It is listed as an endangered species on the California state and federal levels.

== Description ==
Erysimum menziesii is a mustardlike biennial or perennial herb which is short in size, reaching maximum heights of usually not more than 15 centimeters. The leaves are long and straight along the stem, and often thicker, hairier, and lobed in shape at the base. The top of the stem is occupied by a thick bunch of flowers with bright yellow, rounded petals. The flowers fall away to leave behind the fruits, which are very long siliques sticking straight out. The plant can vary in appearance, particularly across subspecies.

At least one subspecies is pollinated by the similarly distressed bee Emphoropsis miserabilis. The plant has high production of seeds, but very low seedling survivorship, with over 98% of seedlings perishing within the first year. At least one subspecies is commonly infected with the white rust fungus Albugo canadensis.

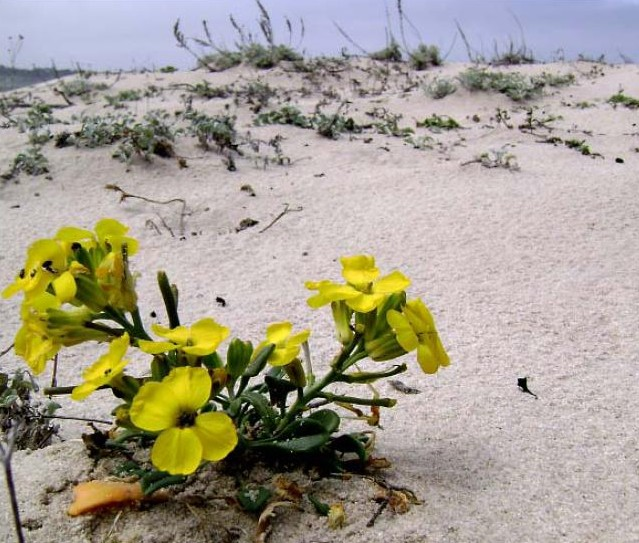
Plant in typical habitat

== Taxonomy ==
The first scientific description of Erysimum menziesii was in 1830 by William Jackson Hooker, who placed it in the Hesperis genus with the name Hesperis menziesii. It was reclassified five times by different botanists but the accepted name was created in 1889 when Richard Wettstein placed it in Erysimum. Together with its genus it is classified in the Brassicaceae family. The species has no accepted subspecies, although two are considered synonyms. It was divided into four subspecies in 1993 by Robert A. Price, but three of these names were invalidly published. In total it has nine synonyms.

Table of Synonyms
Name	Year	Rank	Notes
Arabis menziesii (Hook.) A.Nelson	1905	species	≡ hom.
Cheiranthus grandiflorus A.Heller	1906	species	= het.
Cheiranthus menziesii (Hook.) Benth. & Hook.f. ex E.Fourn.	1868	species	≡ hom.
Erysimum grandiflorum Nutt.	1838	species	= het., nom. illeg. homonym. post.
Erysimum menziesii subsp. eurekense R.A.Price	1993	subspecies	= het., unknown publication, not validly publ.
Erysimum menziesii subsp. yadonii R.A.Price	1993	subspecies	= het., unknown publication, not validly publ.
Hesperis menziesii Hook.	1830	species	≡ hom.
Parrya menziesii (Hook.) Greene	1891	species	≡ hom.
Phoenicaulis menziesii (Hook.) Steud.	1841	species	≡ hom.
Notes: ≡ homotypic synonym; = heterotypic synonym

=== Subspecies ===
The subspecies used in various publications include:

- E. m. ssp. eurekense (Humboldt Bay wallflower) — known from a few occurrences in the vicinity of Humboldt Bay. It grows with other beach species such as beach sagewort (Artemisia pycnocephala), coast buckwheat (Eriogonum latifolium), (sand verbena (Abronia latifolia), and (beach pea (Lathyrus littoralis). It occurs within the Humboldt Bay National Wildlife Refuge. Some of its habitat is on beaches owned by the city of Eureka, California, and by private entities.
- E. m. ssp. menziesii — a plant with a disjunct distribution on either side of the San Francisco Bay Area, it is known from the Mendocino Coast and Monterey Peninsula. It grows in bare beach sand which is often wet from the tides and seaspray, and can be battered by storms. Other plants in the area include evening primrose (Camissonia cheiranthifolia), beach bur (Ambrosia chamissonis), sea rocket (Cakile maritima), and beach knotweed (Polygonum paronychia). The northern population is mostly within MacKerricher State Park and the southern occurs on Asilomar State Beach and a few nearby dunes.
- E. m. ssp. yadonii (Yadon's wallflower) — known from a few occurrences near Marina in Monterey County. Some of have been destroyed by mining operations and other factors. Some plants occur at Marina State Beach, including some individuals which have been propagated and planted in appropriate habitat.
- E. m. ssp. concinnum (curly wallflower) — known from Mendocino County into Oregon. This subspecies was revised from Erysimum concinnum to a subspecies of E. menziesii after the 1992 listing, so it was not included under the Endangered Species Act. However, it is an accepted name in Plants of the World Online, the Flora of North America, and World Plants.

== Range and habitat ==
According to the Flora of North America the species grows in just three counties, Humboldt, Mendocino, and Monterey. There it grows on stabilized sand dunes along the coast at elevations from sea level to 300 meters (980 ft).

== Conservation ==
Because Erysimum menziesii ssp. concinnum has been included within this species since it received its federal listing as Erysimum concinnum, the species is now technically more abundant than it was then, but there is no current reliable estimate of the species' abundance now. In 1997, there were about 22 occurrences containing 33,300 individuals, not counting ssp. concinnum.

A number of forces threaten the species' existence. Minor threats include trampling by hikers and horseback riders, off-road vehicles, and sand mining operations. Many occurrences of the plant are protected from these threats. A more major threat is the invasion of non-native plant species such as Pampas grass (Cortaderia jubata). Conservation projects underway for the species include removal of this vegetation from the habitat.
