= Humboldt Bay National Wildlife Refuge =

National Wildlife Refuge in California

- IUCN category IV (habitat/species management area)
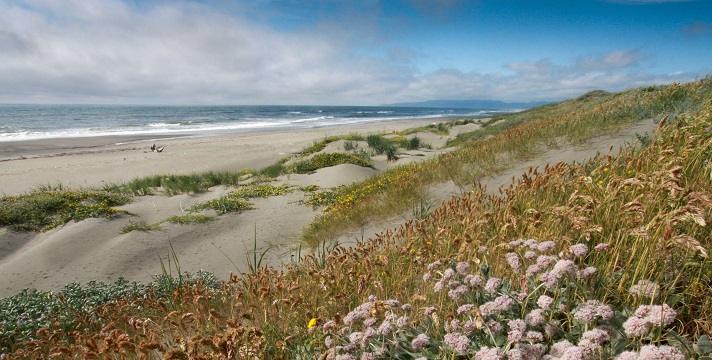

- Location within the United States
- Location: Humboldt County, California, United States
- Nearest city: Eureka, California
- Coordinates: 40.71651°N 124.21783°W
- Area: 4,000 acres (16 km^{2})
- Established: 1971
- Governing body: U.S. Fish and Wildlife Service
- Website: Humboldt Bay National Wildlife Refuge

Humboldt Bay National Wildlife Refuge is located on Humboldt Bay, on the California North Coast near the cities of Eureka and Arcata. The refuge exists primarily to protect and enhance wetland habitats for migratory water birds using the bay area, including tens of thousands of shorebirds, ducks, geese, swans, and the black brant. Humboldt Bay National Wildlife Refuge, along with other public and private lands around Humboldt Bay, is one of the key stopovers for the millions of migratory birds that rely on the Pacific Flyway. More than 200 bird species, including 80 kinds of water birds and four endangered species, regularly feed, rest, or nest on the refuge or other areas around the bay.

== Ecology ==
The bay provides habitat for approximately 100 species of fish, many of which contribute to sport or commercial fisheries, and provides habitat for fish including steelhead, coho, and Chinook salmon. During the spring, the bay's eelgrass beds are a key staging area for brant goose prior to their return to Arctic nesting grounds; and the refuge grasslands provide important habitat for thousands of Aleutian cackling geese. Like many of the refuges in the system, this one was established to preserve habitats recognized to be instrumental to the perpetual survival of migratory birds and other wildlife. Each spring, over 20,000 Aleutian cackling geese roost on the island from late January through early April. Castle Rock National Wildlife Refuge also serves as a haul out for resting marine mammals including harbor seal, northern elephant seal, California sea lion, and Steller sea lion.

== Humboldt National Wildlife Refuge Complex ==
The refuge is the largest part of the Humboldt National Wildlife Refuge Complex, which is headquartered south of Eureka at its Loleta, California site. The "Complex" is an administrative entity that also manages the Lanphere Dunes Unit and the Castle Rock National Wildlife Refuge. Lanphere Dunes, located on the northern seaward shore of Humboldt Bay, contains the most pristine remaining dune ecosystem in the Pacific Northwest and supports rare and representative examples of older forested dunes, young active dunes, dune swale wetlands, and coastal salt marsh. Castle Rock National Wildlife Refuge is a 14-acre (57,000 m^{2}) island located 80 miles (130 km) north of Humboldt Bay (less than 1-mile (1.6 km) off the Pacific Coast) near Crescent City. The island serves as the second-largest seabird nesting colony in California. Castle Rock Refuge has the largest breeding population of common murres in California.
