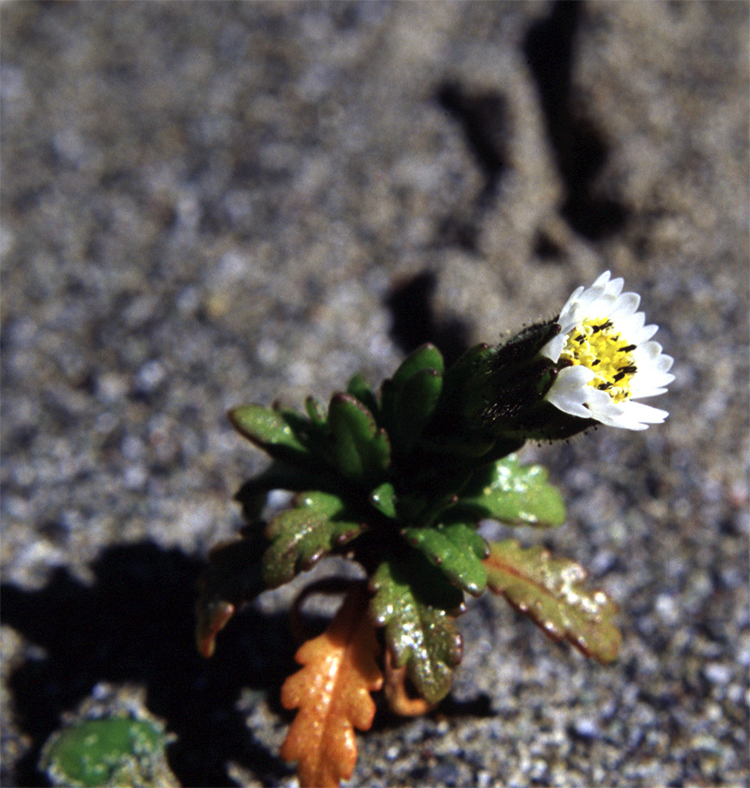

Conservation status
- Imperiled (NatureServe)

Scientific classification
- Kingdom: Plantae
- Clade: Tracheophytes
- Clade: Angiosperms
- Clade: Eudicots
- Clade: Asterids
- Order: Asterales
- Family: Asteraceae
- Genus: Layia
- Species: L. carnosa

Binomial name
- Layia carnosa (Nutt.) Torr. & A. Gray

= Layia carnosa =

Species of flowering plant

Layia carnosa is a species of flowering plant in the family Asteraceae known by the common name beach tidytips, or beach layia. It is endemic to California, where it lives in coastal habitat. It is known from several areas of mostly fragmented or relict sand dune habitat, and it was listed as an endangered species in California. On March 31, 2022, the category was changed from endangered species to threatened species by the US Department of the Interior Fish and Wildlife Service.

== Description ==
This is a petite annual herb producing a short, glandular stem along the ground or somewhat upright to a maximum length of about 18 centimeters. The fleshy green leaves are oval in shape, with the larger ones roughly lobed and up to 4 or 5 centimeters in length. The inflorescence is borne on a short peduncle. The flower head has a base of overlapping green phyllaries which form a cup to hold several small white ray florets. The center is filled with yellow disc florets with purple anthers.

The fruits are small achenes of two types. The ray florets yield hairy, curved fruits with no pappus, while the disc florets yield fruits with a long, hairlike pappus.

== Ecology, habitat, and resource needs ==
Beach layia germinates during the rainy season between fall and midwinter, blooms in spring (March to July), and completes its life cycle before the dry season (July to September). Populations tend to be patchy and subject to large annual fluctuations in size and dynamic changes in local distribution associated with the shifts in dune blowouts, remobilization, and natural dune stabilization that occur in the coastal dune ecosystem. Beach layia plants often occur where sparse vegetation traps wind-dispersed seeds, but causes minimal shading. Seeds are dispersed by wind mostly during late spring and summer months. Additionally, beach layia is self-compatible (i.e., able to be fertilized by its own pollen), is capable of self-pollination, and is visited by a variety of insects that may assist in cross-pollination . Although the role of pollinators is currently unclear, sexual reproduction does add to genetic diversity. Beach layia occurs in open spaces of sandy soil between the low-growing perennial plants in the Abronia latifolia—Ambrosia chamissonis herbaceous alliance (dune mat) and Leymus mollis herbaceous alliance (sea lyme grass patches). Typically, the total vegetation cover in both communities is relatively sparse, and many annual species, including beach layia, colonize the space between established, tufted perennials. Beach layia can also occur in narrow bands of moderately disturbed habitat along the edges of trails and roads in dune systems dominated by invasive species.

Coastal dune systems are composed of a mosaic of vegetation communities of varying successional stages. Beach layia occurs in early to midsuccessional communities in areas where sand is actively being deposited or eroding. Too much sand movement prevents plants from establishing, but areas with some movement on a periodic basis support early successional communities. Movement of sand by wind is essential for the development and sustainability of a dune system. Wind is also important to beach layia specifically because it is the mechanism by which seeds are dispersed. The achenes (a small, dry, one-seeded fruit that does not open to release the seed) have pappus (feathery bristles) that allow them to be carried by wind for a short distance. Although not all seeds may land on suitable habitat, this adaptation allows the small annual to spread across the landscape into uninhabited areas. As a winter germinating annual, beach layia requires rainfall during the winter months (November through February) for germination and, although it is relatively tolerant to the droughtlike conditions of upland dunes, it does need some moisture through the spring to prevent desiccation. Moisture also reduces the risk of burial, as dry sand is more mobile and mortality caused by burial has been documented. The overall resource needs that beach layia requires in order for individuals to complete their life cycles and for populations to maintain viability are: (1) Sandy soils with sparse native vegetation cover, (2) Rainfall during the winter germination period, (3) Sunlight (full sun exposure for photosynthesis), and (4) Unknown degree of crosspollination (to add to genetic diversity).
