= USS Milwaukee =

Five ships in the United States Navy have been named USS Milwaukee for the city in Wisconsin.

- USS Milwaukee (1864), was a monitor, launched in 1864 and sunk by enemy action in 1865.
- USS Milwaukee (C-21) was a St. Louis-class cruiser, commissioned in 1906, wrecked attempting to salvage USS H-3 and decommissioned in 1917.
- USS Milwaukee (CL-5), was an Omaha-class cruiser, commissioned in 1923, transferred to the Soviet Navy as Murmansk, returned and scrapped in 1949.
- USS Milwaukee (AOR-2), was a Wichita-class replenishment oiler, commissioned in 1969 and decommissioned in 1994.
- USS Milwaukee (LCS-5), is a Freedom-class littoral combat ship, first announced in 2011. It was commissioned in November 2015 in Milwaukee.
