= List of shipwrecks of Humboldt County, California =

The list of shipwrecks of Humboldt County, California lists the ships which sank on or near the coast of Humboldt County from the Del Norte county line to the north, the marine area around Cape Mendocino and south to the Mendocino County line to the south, as well as within Humboldt Bay itself. If survivors or casualties arrived or were immediately taken to locations in the county, the ship was added to this list. The list includes ships later refloated and repaired.

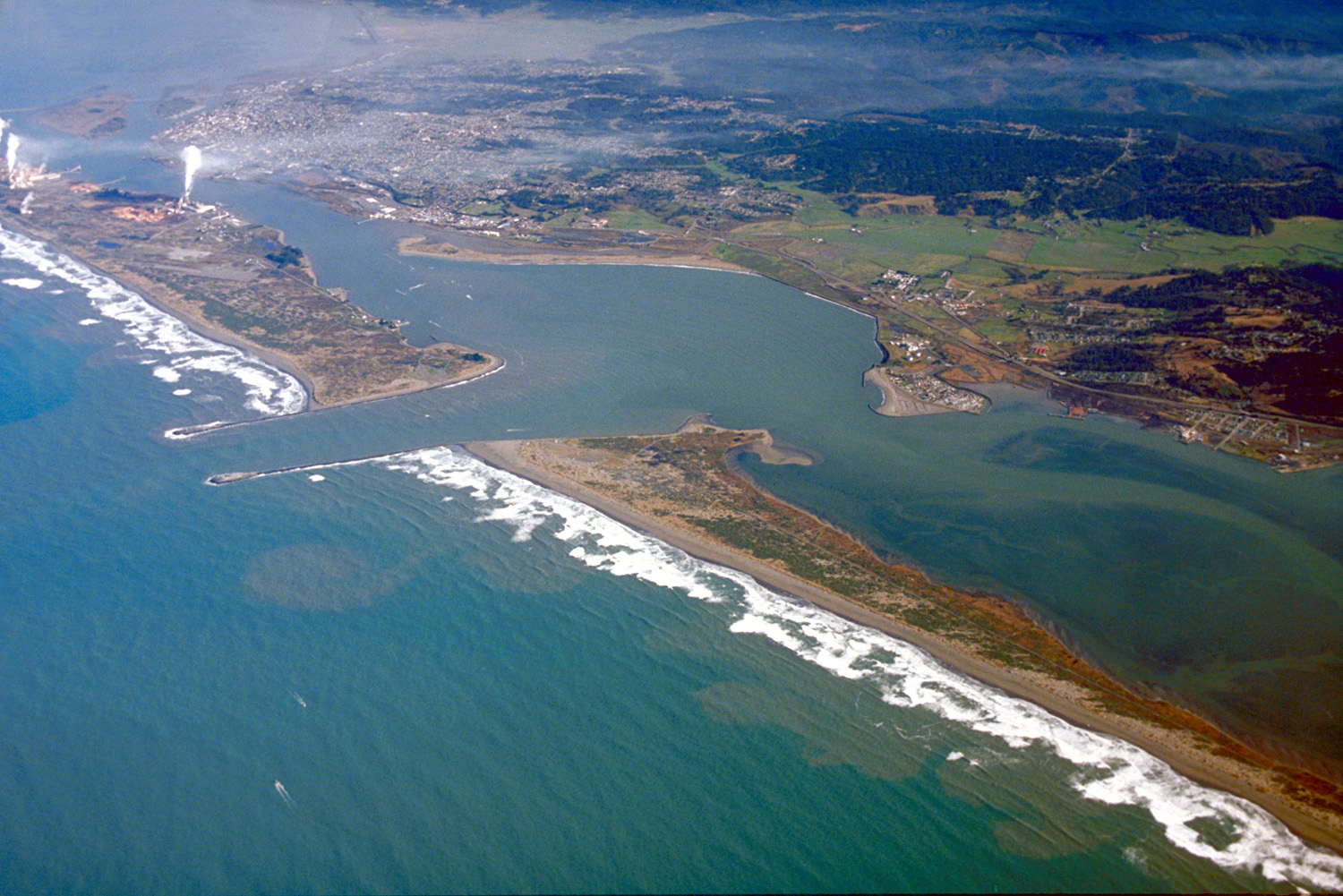
The approach to Humboldt Bay is treacherous due to currents, winds and shifting sandbars. Jetties and harbor improvements reduced shipwrecks in the late 20th century.

== 1850 - 1875 ==
- Sea Gull (United States), 26 February 1852. The steamer wrecked on a beach near the Humboldt Bar after losing power in a storm. There were no fatalities; all cargo and machinery were salvaged.
- Northerner (United States), 6 January 1860. A paddle steamer that hit a rock off Centerville Beach. Thirty-eight of the 108 aboard died; some are buried in a mass grave at the site 39°57′29.43″N 124°11′2.26″W.
- Mary Ann (United States), 1863. The Mary Ann was the primary tug in Humboldt Bay for many years. She wrecked in 1863 on the south spit of Humboldt Bay and subsequently refloated.
- Merrimac (United States), 22 February 1863. The tug flipped over while trying to cross the bar with loss of all on board, estimated to be 18. She was refloated and repaired.

== 1875 - 1900 ==
- Mendocino (United States), 2 December 1888. The two-masted steam schooner was wrecked on Humboldt Bar, abandoned 7 January 1889, the lumber cargo was saved, one child died. The ship lay where it was wrecked until she broke up. 40°55′0″N 124°8′30″W
- Collaroy (Australia), June 1889. The four-masted barquentine was wrecked on Humboldt Bay bar. 40°55′0″N 124°8′30″W

== 1900 - 1910 ==
- Argo (United States) The steamship grounded at Eel River and was refloated, but was later totally wrecked at Tillamook Bay bar, Oregon 1909.
- Tricolor (Norway), 26 July 1905. She launched at South Shields, United Kingdom only eleven months before the wreck off Cape Mendocino. Survivors rowed life boats through the waves to the Blunt Reef Lightship (United States) from which they were rescued. The waves rapidly broke the freighter which spilled its load of coal on the seafloor and sank.40°28′0″N 124°24′30″W
- Corinthian (United States), 11 June 1906. This two-masted coastal schooner was wrecked with the loss of two of her twelve-man crew. While other sources have reported the loss of the entire crew, the Annual Report of the United States Life-Saving Service for the Fiscal Year Ended June 30, 1906, carries a detailed account of the rescue of the ten surviving crew members. 40°46′15″N 124°14′45″W
- Sequoia (United States). The crew got off safely when this lumber schooner was wrecked on the Humboldt Bay bar.40°46′15″N 124°14′45″W
- Corona United States, 1 March 1907. Built in 1888 in Philadelphia, this passenger ship wrecked at the entrance to Humboldt Bay. One person died in the first boat lowered, the rest of the 154 people on board waited for rescue by the life-saving station and were saved. The ship rotted where it came aground. Her wreck could be seen until at least the early 1970s.40°45′50″N 124°14′54″W
- Columbia (United States), 21 July 1907. Columbia was the first ship to carry a dynamo to power electric lights instead of oil lamps and the first commercial use of electric light bulbs outside of Thomas Edison's Menlo Park, New Jersey laboratory. Columbia was lost on 21 July 1907 after a collision with the lumber schooner San Pedro (United States) off Shelter Cove, California. Seventy survivors took shelter on the ruined San Pedro; ultimately 88 survived and 87 were declared lost or missing. The Columbia went down so fast many never made it to the decks and no salvage was undertaken.40°10′7″N 124°20′0″W

== 1911 - 1920 ==
- Bear (United States), 14 June 1916. The ocean liner broke up on the rocks within 0.5 nautical miles (930 m) of Sugar Loaf Rock. Twenty-nine survivors made it to the beach. Others rowed to the Blunts Reef Lightship ( United States Lighthouse Service) where 155 people crowded aboard the tiny lightship waiting rescue. Five were lost. The captain finally abandoned the liner which was a loss of over $1,000,000 in contemporary funds. After several salvage attempts the remains were abandoned.
- USS H-3 (United States Navy), 14 December 1916. Grounded offshore Samoa, California about 200 meters from shore. The crew was rescued. The USS Milwaukee was lost during attempts to refloat the submarine, although the sub was later moved overland on redwood rollers to Humboldt Bay and refloated.
- USS Milwaukee, (United States Navy) January 1917. A St. Louis-class protected cruiser that ran aground off Samoa, California in a naval fiasco during refloating attempts of USS H-3 (United States Navy). The Milwaukee was a total loss. 40.812300°N 124.198333°W

== 1921 - 1950 ==
- Alaska (United States, 6 August 1921. The ocean liner crashed into Blunt's Reef. The boilers exploded and she sank after only four lifeboats were released. There were 166 survivors – many plucked from the water by rescuers – and 42 dead and missing, of which only 17 bodies were recovered. 40°26′54″N 124°28′0″W
- Brooklyn (United States), 8 November 1931. Built in Gray's Harbor, Washington in 1901, the schooner capsized and broke in the entrance to Humboldt Bay with loss of eighteen lives. One survivor was found floating on a hatch cover miles away from the wreck.40°49′0″N 124°11′40″W
