= Yankee (ferry) =

1907 ferry

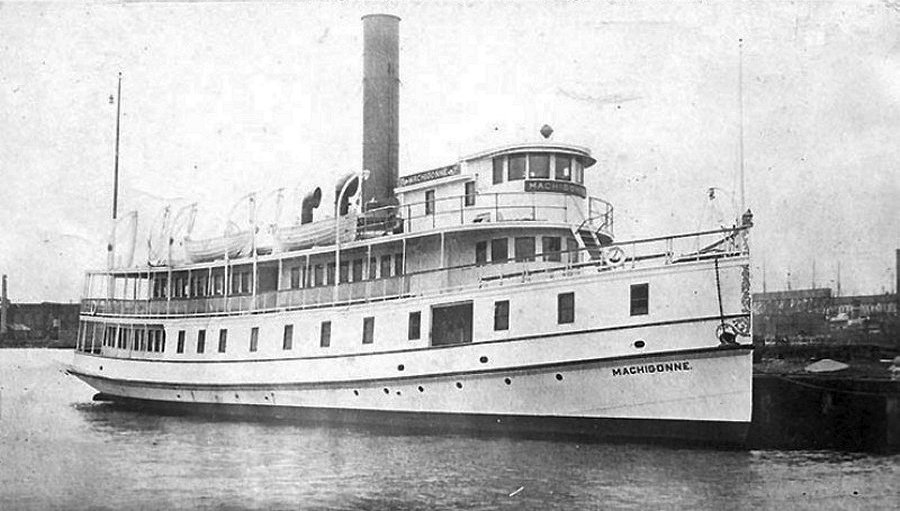
- Yankee as SS Machigonne, date unknown

History

United States
- Name: Yankee
- Owner: Private ownership
- Builder: Neafie & Levy
- Yard number: 1004
- Christened: Dida
- Completed: 1907
- Commissioned: (Into the US Navy): 15 May 1918
- Decommissioned: 1919?
- In service: Commercial: 1907–1917, 1919-1980s; Navy: 1918–1919
- Renamed: Machigonne, Hook Mountain, Block Island, League Island, Yankee
- Reclassified: SP-1043 (Navy service)
- Status: Operational but not in service

General characteristics
- Type: Ferry
- Tonnage: 489 gross, 289 net
- Length: 136 ft (41 m)
- Beam: 29 ft (8.8 m)
- Draft: 8 ft
- Depth of hold: 9 ft 6 in
- Installed power: 450 horsepower (original)
- Propulsion: Triple expansion steam engine; replaced 1947 by General Motors V12 diesel
- Speed: 12 knots
- Armament: 2 × 1 pdrs (Navy service)
- Machigonne
- U.S. National Register of Historic Places
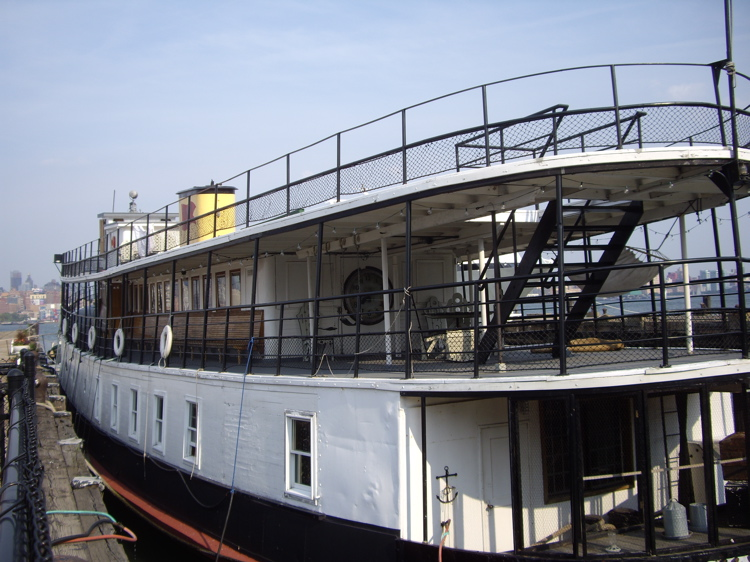
- Location: Hudson River, Hoboken, New Jersey
- NRHP reference No.: 92001610
- Added to NRHP: 3 December 1992

Yankee (also known as Machigonne) is an early-20th-century steel hulled ferry that is the oldest surviving Ellis Island ferry boat. In 2006 it was moored in Hoboken, New Jersey, in mid-2013 it was moved to the Henry Street pier in the Gowanus Bay Terminal in Red Hook, Brooklyn, and as of 2024 is in Staten Island. It is registered as a historic vessel with the National Register of Historic Places, and was owned and inhabited by ceramic artist Victoria MacKenzie-Childs.

== Operational history ==
Described as unusually luxurious for a day-voyaging vessel, Yankee was built in 1907 by the Philadelphian shipbuilding company Neafie & Levy for the Casco Bay and Harpswell Line. There is some confusion about her original name, with some sources listing it as Dida. It is unclear however, if the ship ever operated under that name, since she is commonly referred to as Machigonne from an early point in her career.

Machigonne began her service life ferrying passengers between Portland, Maine and the Calendar Islands in Casco Bay. In 1913, she was sold to the Nahant Steamship Line of Boston, Massachusetts, and used on the Boston, Nahant and Pines Island route.

Following America's entry into World War I, Machigonne was acquired by the United States Navy on 2 October 1917 under charter, and commissioned 15 May 1918 as USS Machigonne (SP-1043). During the war, the ship was armed with two one-pounder guns for defense, and used to transport men and supplies between Boston and Bumpkin Island Training Station.

After the end of hostilities, USS Machigonne was decommissioned and resumed commercial service. In 1921, the ship was purchased by John E. Moore and transferred to New York Harbor. For the next eight years, Machigonne was used to ferry newly arriving immigrants from their incoming ships to Ellis Island, and thenceforth to the mainland. These immigrants, many of whom were kept below decks on their transatlantic voyage, are said to have obtained their first views of New York City from the decks of Machigonne. In this period, the ship was also used to ferry tourists to the Statue of Liberty.

In 1929, the ship was sold to a Captain Daniel F. McAllister, and renamed Hook Mountain. For the next ten years she operated as a tour boat, carrying passengers from Battery Park to Bedloe's Island and Governors Island. Hook Mountain was sold to a Rhode Island company in 1939, and renamed Block Island. She also operated under the name League Island when requisitioned for World War II service. In 1947, the vessel had her original steam propulsion replaced with a 900 Hp GM diesel from a LST, was renamed Yankee and used to transport vacationers from Providence to Block Island, a task that apparently continued for several decades. The vessel was finally retired from commercial service after the 1983 summer season which included a charter to the America's Cup Races off of Newport, RI. It was then laid up in Montville, CT for several years. It was later towed to Providence, RI and docked very close to where she used to depart from for Block Island service and was neglected and became a target for vandals.

== Restoration ==
In 1990, the by-now dilapidated Yankee was bought by a private citizen, Jim Gallagher, who towed it to Pier 25, Tribeca, Manhattan, where he began working on its restoration. In an unusual arrangement, Gallagher was permitted by the local authorities to live on the boat in order to continue with his work. To help pay for the job, Gallagher rented the boat out to weddings and parties. The vessel was added to the National Register of Historic Places in 1992. In 2003, Gallagher sold the boat to new owners: ceramic artists Victoria MacKenzie-Childs and her husband Richard MacKenzie-Childs, who paid $365,000. The new owners pledged to continue with the restoration work. At the time, the Yankee was not in a suitable condition to carry passengers, and the hull had thinned to less than 1/8 inch (3.2 mm) in some places.

By 2005, the MacKenzie-Childs family had to relocate because Pier 25 had become dilapidated. The boat was moved to Hoboken, New Jersey, the next year. The Mackenzie-Childs family moved it to a dock in Red Hook, Brooklyn in 2013. The ship underwent a hull restoration in 2017 and was listed for sale by Franklin-Ruttan in 2018 for $2.37 million. As of 2025 the couple still inhabited the ferry, which is moored in Staten Island; at the time, the couple had placed it for sale. The boat was still seeking a buyer when Victoria MacKenzie-Childs died in 2026. While interior repair and restoration work is ongoing, the ship needed to have its hull inspected, repaired, and deemed seaworthy again.

Although operational, the boat is apparently not used for actual voyages since it lacks a seaworthiness certificate. Yankee is one of several vessels built by Neafie & Levy to be either still operational or operating until very recently. Another Neafie & Levy vessel that is still operational is the tugboat Jupiter. A third vessel, the tugboat Tuff-E-Nuff (originally the Thomas Cunningham Sr.), built in 1895, was remarkably still in commercial service in its original role as of May 2007.
