= Thomas Cunningham =

Thomas, Tom or Tommy Cunningham may refer to:

- Thomas Cunningham (Wisconsin politician) (1852–1941), Wisconsin Secretary of State, 1891–1895
- Thomas Cunningham (Canadian politician) (1837–1916), merchant, horticulturist, and politician in British Columbia, Canada
- Thomas Mounsey Cunningham (1776–1834), Scottish poet
- Tom Cunningham (Australian footballer) (1901–1964), former Australian rules footballer
- Tom Cunningham (missionary) (1906–1959), Jesuit missionary on Little Diomede Island
- Tom Cunningham (hurler) (born 1931), Irish hurling player
- Tommy Cunningham (footballer) (born 1955), English former footballer
- Tommy Cunningham (rugby league) (born 1956), Welsh rugby league player
- Tommy Cunningham (born 1964), Scottish drummer with Wet Wet Wet
- Tom Cunningham, fictional character in Hollyoaks
- Tom Cunningham (jockey) (born 1822)

== See also ==
- Thomas Cunningham Cochran (1877–1957), American politician
- Thomas Cunningham Gillespie (1892–1914), British rower
- Tuff-E-Nuff (tugboat), known as Thomas Cunningham Sr., a late 19th-century tugboat
