= West Humboldt =

West Humboldt may refer to:

- West Humboldt, California
- West Humboldt Range, mountain range in Nevada
