= SS-30 =

SS-30 may refer to:

- SS-X-30, the NATO reporting name of the RS-28 Sarmat, a Russian ICBM
- USS H-3 (SS-30), a United States Navy H-class submarine.
