= USS St. Louis (C-20) =

St. Louis-class cruiser

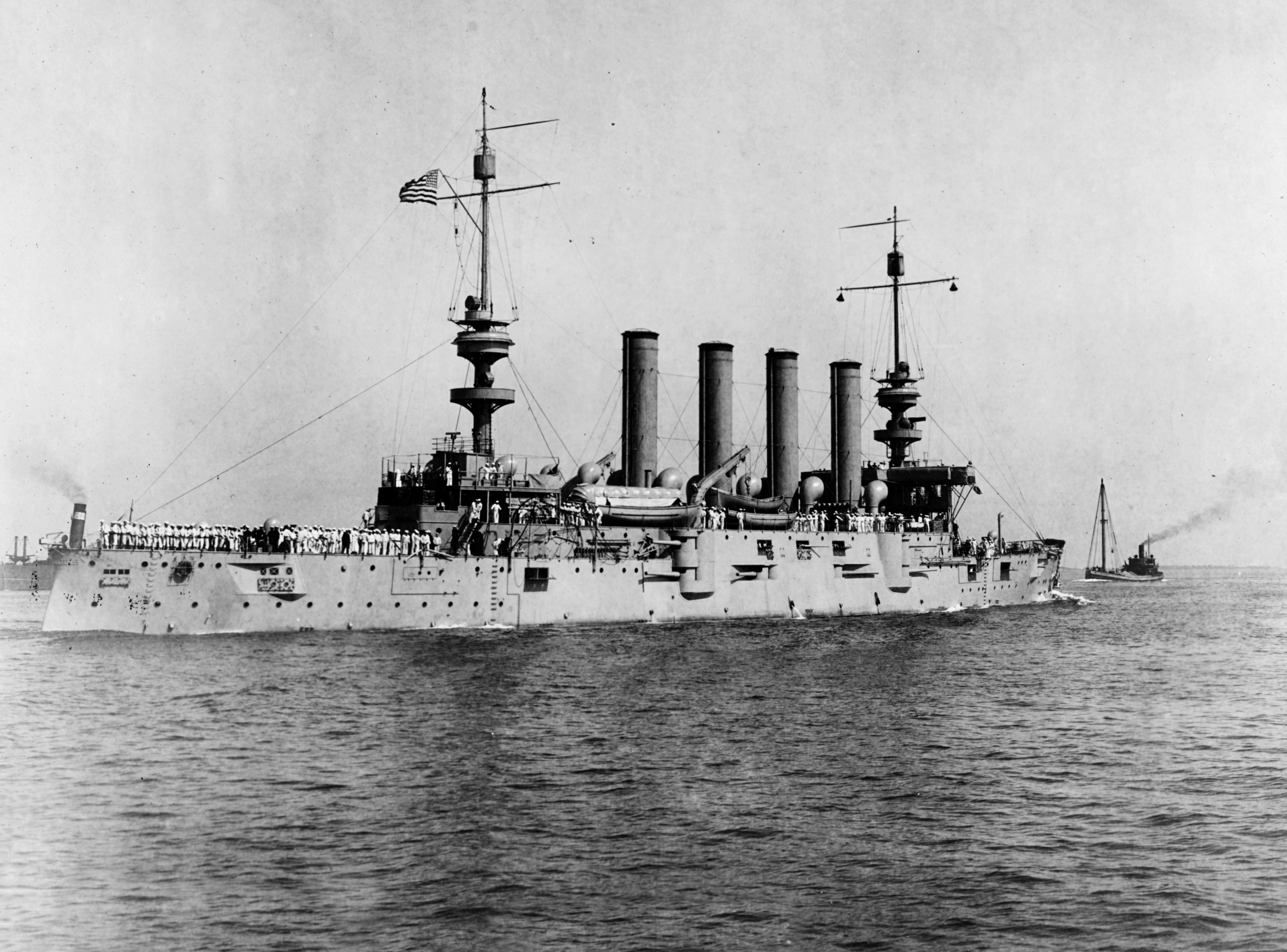
- USS St. Louis (C-20), off the Boston Navy Yard, Massachusetts, 14 September 1917.

History

United States
- Name: St. Louis
- Namesake: City of St. Louis, Missouri
- Ordered: 7 June 1900
- Awarded: 11 March 1901
- Builder: Neafie & Levy Co., Philadelphia, Pennsylvania
- Cost: $2,740,000 (contract price of hull and machinery)
- Laid down: 31 July 1902
- Launched: 6 May 1905
- Sponsored by: Miss Gladys Bryant Smith
- Commissioned: 18 August 1906
- Decommissioned: 3 March 1922
- Reclassified: CA-18, 17 July 1920
- Stricken: 20 March 1930
- Identification: Hull symbol: C-20; Hull symbol: CA-18
- Fate: Sold for scrap on 13 August 1930
- Notes: 14 July 1912, assigned to the Oregon Naval Militia; 27 April 1914, designated as a Receiving Ship; 29 July 1916, assigned as a Submarine tender

General characteristics (as built)
- Class & type: St. Louis-class protected cruiser
- Displacement: 9,700 long tons (9,856 t) (standard); 10,839 long tons (11,013 t) (full load)
- Length: 426 ft 6 in (130.00 m)oa; 424 ft (129 m)pp
- Beam: 66 ft (20 m)
- Draft: 22 ft 6 in (6.86 m) (mean)
- Installed power: 12 × Babcock & Wilcox boilers; 21,000 ihp (16,000 kW)
- Propulsion: 2 × vertical triple expansion reciprocating engines; 2 × screws
- Speed: 22 knots (41 km/h; 25 mph); 22.13 knots (40.98 km/h; 25.47 mph) (Speed on Trial)
- Armament: 14 × 6 in (152 mm)/50 caliber Mark 6 Breech-loading rifles; 18 × 3 in (76 mm)/50 cal guns; 12 × 3-pounder (47 mm (1.9 in)) saluting guns; 8 × 1-pounder (37 mm (1.5 in)) rapid-fire guns; 4 × 1-pounder (37 mm) guns
- Armor: Belt armor: 4 in (102 mm); Deck (amidships): 2–3 in (51–76 mm); Shields: 4 in; Conning tower: 5 in (127 mm)

General characteristics (1921)
- Armament: 12 × 6 in/50 caliber breech-loading rifles; 4 × 3 in/50 caliber guns; 2 × 3 in/50 anti-aircraft guns; 4 × 3-pounder (47 mm) saluting guns

The USS St. Louis (C-20/CA-18), was the lead ship of her class of protected cruisers in the United States Navy. St. Louis was launched on 6 May 1905 by the Neafie & Levy Company, of Philadelphia, Pennsylvania. She was sponsored by Miss Gladys Bryant Smith and commissioned on 18 August 1906 with Captain Nathaniel R. Usher in command.

== Service history ==
=== Pre-war ===
Assigned to the Pacific Fleet, St. Louis departed Tompkinsville, New York, on 15 May 1907 following completion of her trials along the Virginia coast. St. Louis called at Port Castries, Bahia, Rio de Janeiro, Montevideo, Punta Arenas, Valparaíso, Callao, and Acapulco before arriving at San Diego on 31 August 1907. Operating off the west coast into the spring of 1908, she steamed from Puget Sound to Honolulu in June, then cruised in Central American waters from July to October. On 5 November 1909, St. Louis returned to Puget Sound and was placed in reserve on 14 November.

Decommissioned on 3 May 1910, St. Louis was recommissioned, in reserve, on 7 October 1911 at the Puget Sound Navy Yard. She departed Puget Sound on 13 July 1911 for San Francisco and brief service as receiving ship there. After undergoing repairs, 22 July 1911 to 28 February 1912, she joined the Pacific Reserve Fleet again on 12 March. From 14 July 1912 until 26 April 1913, she operated in support of the Oregon Naval Militia, then returned to the Puget Sound Navy Yard to be placed in the Pacific Reserve Fleet for a year. She departed Puget Sound on 24 April 1914 and commenced her next assignment as receiving ship at San Francisco on the 27th. Returning north to Bremerton, St. Louis was again placed in the Pacific Reserve Fleet on 17 February 1916.

Detached from the Reserve Fleet on 10 July 1916, St. Louis departed Puget Sound on 21 July for Honolulu. Arriving at Pearl Harbor on 29 July, she commenced her next duty assignment as tender, Submarine Division Three, Pacific Fleet, with additional duty as station ship, Pearl Harbor. When it became evident that the crew of the interned German sloop Geier intended to scuttle their ship, an armed party from St. Louis boarded the ship on 4 February 1917 and seized her. Geier subsequently served the United States as Schurz.

=== World War I ===
Placed in reduced commission on 6 April 1917, as the United States entered World War I, St. Louis departed Honolulu on 9 April to join the cruiser force engaged in escorting convoys bound for Europe. Calling first at San Diego, she took on board 517 National Naval Volunteers and apprentice seamen to bring her war complement to 823 officers and men. On 20 April, she was placed in full commission. A month later, she arrived in the Panama Canal Zone and embarked the 7th, 17th, 20th, 43d, 51st and 55th companies of Marines. She transported them to Santiago de Cuba and then sailed for Philadelphia, arriving on 29 May 1917.

St. Louis's first convoy duty began on 17 June 1917 when she departed New York in escort of Group 4, American Expeditionary Force. Returning to Boston for repairs on 19 July 1917, she had completed six additional voyages, escorting convoys bound from New York for ports in Britain and France by the end of the war.

Together with the USS Huntington she left Halifax on 30 October 1917 carrying members of a high-level U.S. Commission to confer with the European Allies. Escorted by USS Balch and other British and American vessels she arrived in Plymouth on the evening of 7 November.

=== Post-war ===
After the Armistice, St. Louis was immediately pressed into service returning troops to the United States. She returned 8,437 troops to Hoboken, New Jersey, from Brest, France, in seven round-trip crossings between 17 December 1918 and 17 July 1919 when she arrived at the Philadelphia Navy Yard for repairs.

Designated CA-18 on 17 July 1920 and assigned to post-war duty with the European Squadron, St. Louis departed Philadelphia on 10 September 1920 for Sheerness, Cherbourg and Constantinople. She disembarked military passengers at Sheerness on 26 September, then continued on to the Mediterranean and reported to the Commander, United States Naval Forces in Turkish Waters at Constantinople on 19 October. Standing up the Bosphorus from Constantinople on 13 November, St. Louis embarked refugees at Sevastopol and Yalta, returning them to Constantinople on 16 November. The following day, her crew formed boat landing parties to distribute food among refugees quartered aboard naval transports anchored in the Bosphorus. St. Louis continued her humanitarian duties at Constantinople and at Anatolian ports during the time of unrest caused by the Russian Civil War and the Turkish revolution.

She departed Asia Minor for Naples on 19 September 1921 and called at Gibraltar.

== Decommissioning and fate ==
On 11 November, St. Louis arrived at Philadelphia where, on completion of pre-inactivation overhaul, she was decommissioned on 3 March 1922. In reserve until struck from the Navy List on 20 March 1930, St. Louis's hulk was sold for scrap on 13 August in accordance with the provisions of the London Naval Treaty and Second London Naval Treaty for the limitation and reduction of naval armament.

== Bibliography ==
- Sieche, Erwin F. (1990). "Austria-Hungary's Last Visit to the USA". Warship International. XXVII (2): 142–164. ISSN 0043-0374.
