= St. Louis-class cruiser =

Class of American naval ships

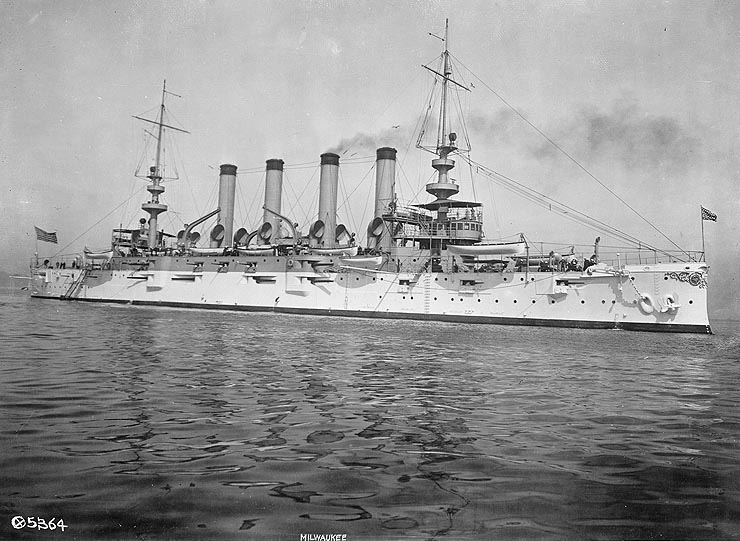
- USS Milwaukee in 1900s

Class overview
- Name: St. Louis-class
- Operators: United States Navy
- Preceded by: Denver class
- Succeeded by: Chester class
- Built: 1902-1906
- In commission: 1905-1923
- Completed: 3
- Lost: 1
- Scrapped: 2

General characteristics (as built)
- Type: Protected cruiser (Semi-armored cruiser)
- Displacement: 9,700 long tons (9,900 t) (normal); 10,839 long tons (11,013 t) (full load)
- Length: 426.6 ft (130.0 m)
- Beam: 66 ft (20 m)
- Draft: 24.10 ft (7.35 m)
- Installed power: 16 × straight-tube Babcock & Wilcox boilers; 2 × vertical triple-expansion engines; 21,000 indicated horsepower (16,000 kW) (design)
- Propulsion: 2 × screws
- Speed: 22 kn (41 km/h; 25 mph) (design)
- Complement: 673 officers and enlisted
- Armament: 14 × 6"/50 caliber Mark 6 guns; 14 × 6"/50 caliber Mark 8 guns (Milwaukee); 18 × 3"/50 caliber guns; 12 × 3-pounder guns; 4 × 1-pounder guns; 8 × 1-pounder RF guns; 2 × .30 caliber Lewis machine guns
- Armor: Belt: 4 in (102 mm) with 4 in upper belt at casemates; Deck: 3 in (76 mm) slope, 2 in (51 mm) flat; Conning tower: 5 in (127 mm)

The St. Louis-class cruisers were a class of three cruisers that served in the United States Navy at the beginning of the 20th century. Authorized in fiscal year 1901 by an Act of Congress of 7 June 1900 as part of the naval buildup touched off by the Spanish–American War, the St. Louis-class cruiser initially began as an improved Olympia. However, during the design phase, decisions were made that increased the size of the vessel from 6,000 long tons (6,100 t) to 9,700 long tons (9,900 t), including adding protection that resulted in the designation "semi-armored cruiser". This led to a larger power plant, and other decisions were made to try to increase speed and range, such as using smaller 6-inch (152 mm) guns instead of 8-inch (203 mm) guns, and adding coal capacity. The completed ship at 9,700 long tons was the same displacement as a full armored cruiser (such as the Royal Navy's Monmouth class, launched four years prior to the St. Louis class) without the same armor. One reference describes the class as "among the earliest well-documented examples of creeping growth in warship design".

Milwaukee grounded near Eureka, California, and was lost in January 1917. The other ships of the class patrolled for German commerce raiders and escorted convoys in World War I, were decommissioned in the early 1920s, and were sold for scrap in 1930 in compliance with the London Naval Treaty.

== Ship type ==
Because of their relatively thin belt, this class was officially described as "semi-armored cruisers", bridging the gap between protected cruisers and armored cruisers. The Register of Ships of the US Navy lists them with the protected cruisers. However, some other references list them as armored cruisers. They were originally designated "cruisers" and not "armored cruisers", in the same series as protected cruisers. The issue is confused by the Navy's official Ships' Data Book for 1911, which lists the St. Louis class as "First Class Cruisers" along with the earlier armored cruisers Saratoga (ex-New York) and Brooklyn.

== Design and construction ==
=== Armament ===
The armament of these ships was very similar to that of the concurrently-built Pennsylvania-class armored cruisers, minus the 8-inch turreted guns and the torpedo tubes. The main armament was fourteen 6-in/50 caliber Mark 6 guns (Mark 8 in Milwaukee), mounted one each fore and aft with the remainder in casemates on the sides. The large secondary armament, intended to combat torpedo boats, included eighteen 3-inch (76 mm)/50 caliber rapid fire (RF) guns and twelve 3-pounder (47-millimetre (1.9 in)) RF guns. Four 1-pounder (37-millimetre (1.5 in)) automatic guns, eight 1-pounder (37-mm) RF guns, and two .30 cal. (7.62 mm) machine guns (possibly the M1895 Colt–Browning machine gun) were also carried.

=== Armor ===
The armor of these ships was similar in arrangement to an armored cruiser, although significantly lighter compared to the concurrently-built Pennsylvania class. Harvey armor was used. A 4 in (102 mm) waterline belt that covered only the machinery spaces was augmented by a 4 in upper belt protecting the casemated guns. The protective deck was 3 in (76 mm) on the sloped sides and at the ends, and 2 in (51 mm) in the flat middle. The conning tower was 5 in (127 mm) thick.

=== Engineering ===
The engineering plant included sixteen coal-fired Babcock & Wilcox straight-tube boilers supplying 250 psi (1,700 kPa) steam to two vertical four-cylinder triple-expansion engines, totaling 21,000 ihp (16,000 kW) for 22 kn (41 km/h; 25 mph) as designed. On trials Milwaukee achieved 22.22 kn (41.15 km/h; 25.57 mph) at 24,166 ihp (18,021 kW). The normal coal allowance was 650 tons, but this could be increased to 1,650 tons.

=== Refits ===
By 1911 the 1-pounder guns and machine guns had been removed, and the 3-pounder armament reduced to four saluting guns. During World War I two of the 6-inch guns and all but four of the 3-inch single-purpose guns were removed, while two 3-in/50 caliber anti-aircraft guns were added.

== Ships in class ==
The three ships of the St. Louis class were:

Ship	Shipyard	Laid down	Launched	Commissioned	Decommissioned	Fate
USS St. Louis (C-20)	Neafie & Levy, Philadelphia	31 July 1902	6 May 1905	18 June 1906	3 March 1922	Sold for scrap 13 August 1930
USS Milwaukee (C-21)	Union Iron Works, San Francisco	30 July 1902	10 September 1904	10 December 1906		Grounded and lost attempting to refloat the submarine H-3 at Samoa Beach, near Eureka, California, on 13 January 1917
USS Charleston (C-22)	Newport News Shipbuilding, Newport News, Virginia	30 January 1902	23 January 1904	17 October 1905	4 December 1923	Sold for scrap 6 March 1930, used as floating breakwater in British Columbia until wrecked 18 February 1961, relocated to Kelsey Bay as breakwater, wreck remains in place

On 17 July 1920 St. Louis and Charleston were reclassified with the new hull numbers CA-18 (armored cruiser) and CA-19, respectively.

== See also ==
- List of cruisers of the United States Navy

== Bibliography ==
- Bauer, K. Jack; Roberts, Stephen S. (1991). Register of Ships of the U.S. Navy, 1775–1990: Major Combatants. Westport, Connecticut: Greenwood Press. ISBN 0-313-26202-0.
- Friedman, Norman (1984). U.S. Cruisers: An Illustrated Design History. Annapolis, Maryland: Naval Institute Press. ISBN 0-87021-718-6.
- Gardiner, Robert; Chesneau, Roger (1979). Conway's All the World's Fighting Ships 1860–1905. New York: Mayflower Books. ISBN 0-8317-0302-4.
