= Independent Pier Company =

- Company type: Towing and Lightering Company
- Industry: Ship assisting, Lighterage, Transportation(1909-1994)
- Headquarters: Headquartered in Philadelphia, Pennsylvania
- Area served: Delaware River, Chesapeake Bay
- Key people: Emil Meyle (Founder) William Harrison Meyle (CEO), William Harrison Meyle II (CEO), Ken Meyle (CEO), and William Harrison Meyle III (CEO)

The Independent Pier Company was founded in Philadelphia, Pennsylvania in 1895 under Emil Meyle's name, and incorporated under this name in 1909.

Emil Meyle went to work in 1909 on the Philadelphia waterfront providing stevedoring and warehousing services. In 1909 he incorporated under the name Independent Pier Company. The company was based at "Pier 34" South Wharves near the foot of Kenilworth Street.

Emil Meyle became a tugboat owner in 1911 when he purchased the steam tugs Active and Neptune and added the Triton in 1913, Pilot Boy in 1917. Emil also bought Chas. Killam and company in 1915 which added 5 lighters to his fleet. Meyle provided wharfage, towing, lightering, stevedoring and terminal operation. The company ran deck and covered lighters, stick lighters, steam cranes and heavy lift crane barges, providing a single agency for Delaware Valley shippers. Lookout in 1920 and F.A. Churchman in 1926

Emil Meyle died in 1917 and following the death of Emil Meyle, William Harrison Meyle took over the company.

Purchases of William Harrison Meyle

William Harrison Meyle purchased theLookout in 1920 and the F.A. Churchman in 1926

 In 1976, it incorporated the tugboats into the Independent Towing Company, and in 1980 the towing business was sold to McAllister Towing.

The company ran the Tioga Marine Terminal for the Philadelphia Port Corporation (now the Delaware River Port Authority).

The company was sold to Thomas Holt in December 1994. One of the tugs JupiterTugboatInformation.com survive, Jupiter in Philadelphia under the Philadelphia Ship Preservation Guild, at Penn's Landing,

The Saturn was scrapped.
