= Jupiter (tugboat) =

Preserved early 20th century tugboat

Coordinates: 39.9453°N 75.1399°W

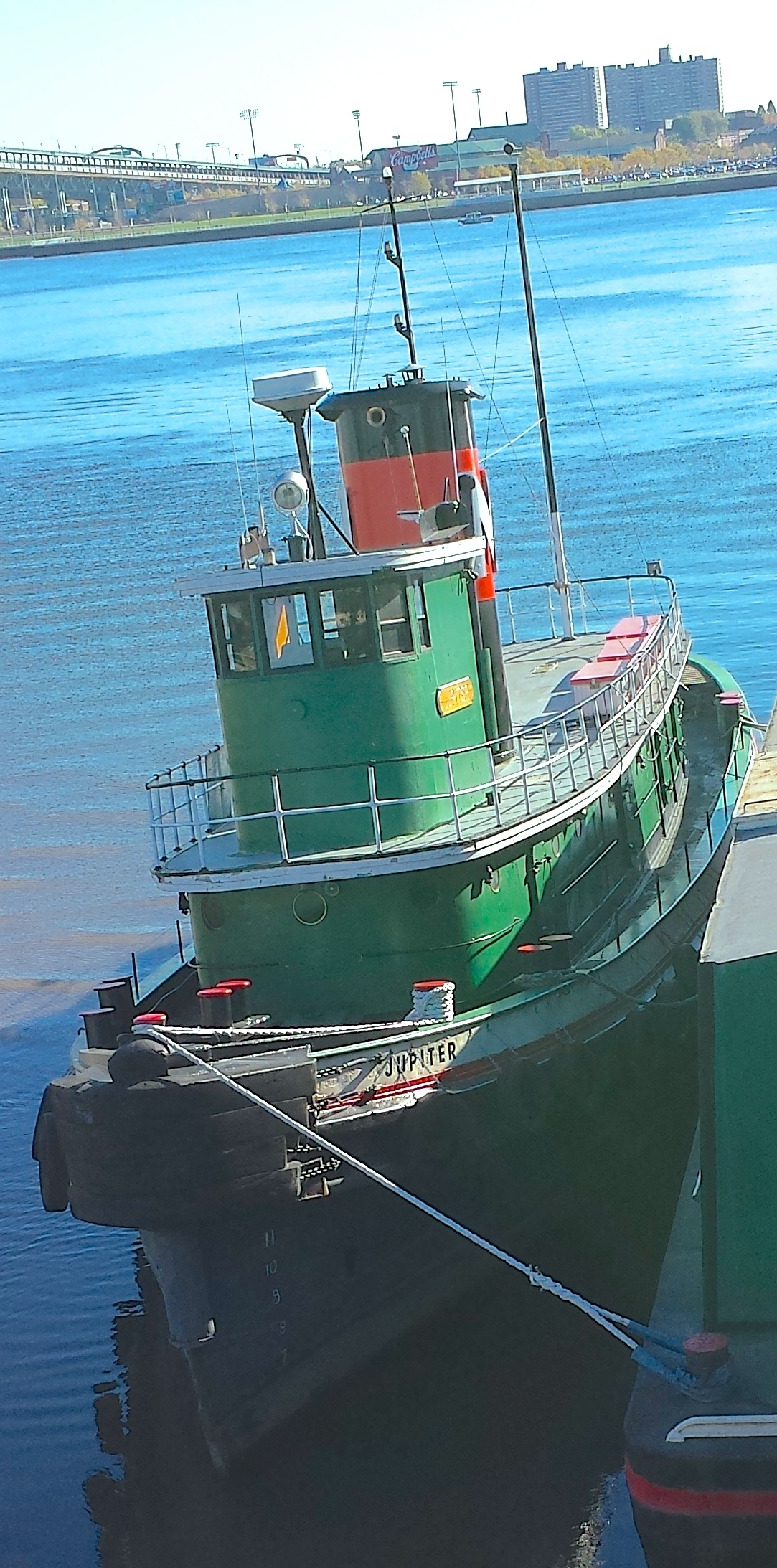
- Jupiter moored at Penn's Landing, Philadelphia

History

United States
- Name: Socony 14 (1903–1914); S.T. Co. No. 14 (1914-1918); Socony 14 (1918-1938); Jupiter (1938-Present)
- Owner: Standard Oil Company (1901–1939); Independent Pier Company (1939–1980); Eastern Towboat of Boston (1980–1989); Delaware River Waterfront Corporation (1989–)
- Operator: Philadelphia Ship Preservation Guild
- Route: Philadelphia & Boston Harbors
- Builder: Neafie & Levy
- Yard number: 961
- Laid down: 1901
- Launched: 1902
- Completed: 1903
- In service: 1902–1989
- Status: Museum ship

General characteristics
- Type: Tugboat
- Tonnage: 147 GT
- Length: 101 ft (31 m)
- Beam: 22 ft (6.7 m)
- Draft: 9 ft 4 in (2.84 m)
- Decks: 4
- Installed power: 1 × 500HP Compound steam (1902–1949); 1 × EMD 567 Main Diesel engine, 2 × Detroit 2-71 Diesel DC Generators (1949–)
- Propulsion: Single screw
- Speed: 13 knots (24 km/h; 15 mph) max
- Crew: 4–12

Jupiter is an American tugboat. It was built in Philadelphia in 1902 by Neafie & Levy for the Standard Oil Company of New York ("Socony"), and was named Socony No. 14. In 1939 it was sold to the Independent Pier Company in Philadelphia, and was renamed Jupiter.

When USS New Jersey was launched in December 1942, Jupiter was one of the tugboats that helped move the massive battleship. Seventy-five years later, Jupiter participated in a ceremony to commemorate the anniversary of the launch (and of the attack on Pearl Harbor a year previously).

In 1949, Jupiter had an engine refit in Baltimore, converting it from steam to diesel power. In 1999 it was retired from work and was sold to the Penn's Landing Corporation.

Jupiter is maintained and preserved by the Philadelphia Ship Preservation Guild, and is used for tourism.
