= Humboldt Bay Life-Saving Station =

- U.S. National Register of Historic Places
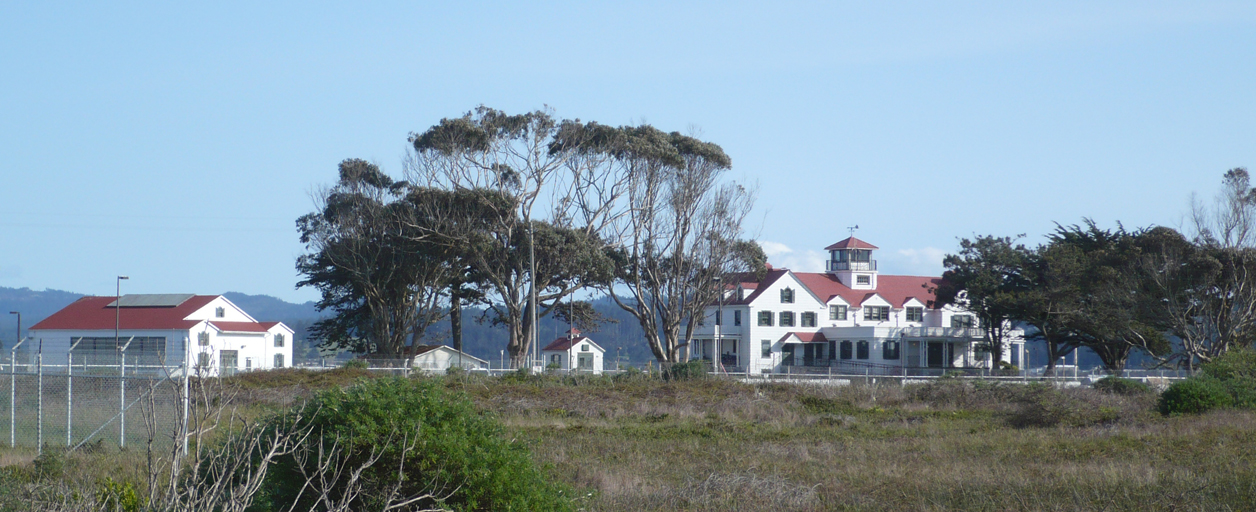
- The Humboldt Bay Life-saving Station

- Location within California Location within the United States
- Nearest city: Eureka, California
- Coordinates: 40°46′0.4″N 124°13′5.3″W
- Area: 46.5 acres (18.8 ha)
- Built: 1936
- Built by: Fred J. Maurer
- Architectural style: Eastern seacoast
- NRHP reference No.: 79000477
- Added to NRHP: October 30, 1979

The Humboldt Bay Life-Saving Station was originally built in November 1878 on the north side of the entrance to Humboldt Bay in northern California, United States, near Eureka, adjacent to the site of the first Humboldt Harbor Light (1856–1892). Rebuilt in 1936 with marine railways to launch rescue surfboats, the historic facility was placed on the National Register of Historic Places on October 30, 1979. The station continues to function as an important asset of the United States Coast Guard in the Coast Guard Group/Air Station Humboldt Bay.

== History ==
=== Early history ===
Humboldt Bay was listed as one of the most dangerous harbor entrances in California due to the narrow 0.25 miles (0.40 km) wide channel with tidal currents and shifting sandbars plus unpredictable weather with high winds and heavy fog.

In 1851, the United States Congress appropriated $15,000 for the Humboldt Harbor Light which entered service in 1856. The vegetable oil burning light shone from a 53 feet (16 m) tall tower whose keeper lived in a Cape Cod style house at the base. The first keeper in 1856 was J. Johnson whose wife, Sara, operated the light after his death in 1859 until 1863. Fog, however, kept the light from being seen well and so other sites were sought. The lighthouse was damaged in 1877 and 1882 by earthquakes and in 1885 by a flood and was abandoned in 1892, when the entire facility, including the Fresnel lens, was relocated to the Table Bluff Light on October 31. Years later, the top of the tower was found in the sand and relocated to the Humboldt Bay Maritime Museum.

Other aids to navigation including bells on boats and fog whistles, including one on the north side of the channel, were in operation by at least 1908. The fog keeper and assistant keeper lived at the actual station. There was nearby housing for their families although none of the buildings remains.

Humboldt and six other Life Saving Stations were built in California. The others were (in alphabetical order) Arena Cove, Fort Point, Golden Gate Park, Point Reyes, Point Bonita, and Southside (in San Francisco). The entire Pacific coast had 20 Life Saving Service stations.

=== Paysonville ===
In 1883 Alexander Ballantyne and Albert Henry Payson, working for the United States Lighthouse Board designed a wharf, stone-cutter's shed, mess hall and housing adjacent to the Humboldt Harbor Lighthouse to prepare and dress hundreds of 2.5 ton granite boulders transported from the Mad River Quarry on railroad flatbed cars transported on barges across the bay. After the stones were cut precisely to full scale templates with a mortise and tenon such that each would fit only one adjacent block precisely, they were wrapped in rope netting, loaded on a narrow gauge railway by steam-driven crane and moved to the wharf from which they were loaded by another steam crane to specially fitted steamer ships to be taken to form the foundation of the St. George Reef Light, on the site of the fatal Brother Jonathan wreck offshore Crescent City, California. It cost $117,000 to quarry and ship, operate the facility and pay the help in 1884, a figure which was higher than expected due to the non-stop rain. The quarry operated from 1884 to 1891, commanded by Chief Payson from 1887 after whom the settlement was named. Paysonville remained idle from 1891 until World War II when it was turned into a Navy seaplane base and is now the Samoa Boat Basin.

=== First station ===
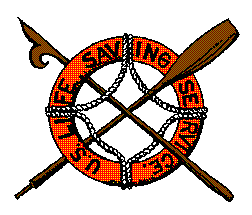
Emblem of the U.S. Life-Saving Service

In 1878, Congress authorized the United States Life-Saving Service although stations were to be built only where navigation conditions were extremely hazardous. The Humboldt Bay station was the second to be built in California after that in Golden Gate Park, San Francisco. It began operating in November 1878 just to the south of Paysonville. The original station was to the north side of the present building and tasked to rescue wrecked and stranded ships and patrol the beaches.

The station was staffed by a keeper and six volunteers. Later "surfmen" would be hired, living at the station which could also house rescue victims. After the 1892 closure of the Humboldt Harbor Light, surfmen used the tower of the old lighthouse as a lookout until the tower collapsed in 1933. By 1896 there were eight surfman each working a six-day week, and in 1901 a telephone was installed to assist in rescue work. In 1910, the first power-driven boat was used for rescue on Humboldt Bay although hand-rowed boats were still used.

=== Second station ===
In 1936, as part of the national New Deal upgrade of Coast Guard facilities, a new Humboldt Bay Station was built to replace the original. The U.S. Coast Guard, Civil Engineer's Office, Washington, D.C., drew up the plans of the building dated February 1936; less than a year and $78,000 later, the building was occupied in January 1937. Chief Garner Churchill commanded the station from 1937 until he retired in 1966. During his tenure, more than 300 people were saved by the station.

The new station housed and fed a 25-man crew and had living quarters for the Chief and his family. Two marine railways were built, originally without handrails, from the bay side boat room to seven feet below mean low tide line. These permitted surf boats to be launched rapidly into sheltered water, and equally important hauled out of the water, sometimes full of rescued people.

During Prohibition, the station stopped rum runners. After the Japanese submarine I-17 shelled the SS Emidio offshore Cape Mendocino killing five sailors on December 20, 1941, the station was charged with foot and horse patrols operating along the coast and beaches.

During World War II, a Navy seaplane base and Blimp facility for K-type depth charge blimps were built to the north of the station at Paysonville. After World War II, the fog station closed and the facility was removed. The blimp station became part of the Eureka Municipal Airport and the circular blimp pads are still visible in aerial photos.

=== Rescues ===
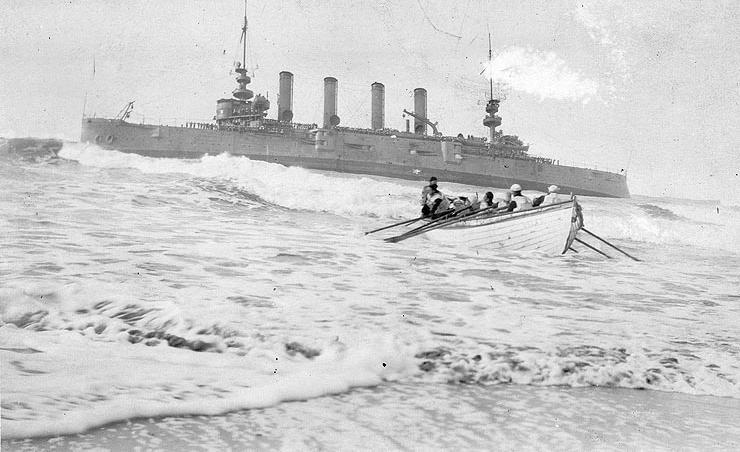
Crew from the Humboldt Bay Life-Saving station rescuing sailors from the wrecked U.S.S. Milwaukee, January 13, 1917. Note how many sailors line the rails.

In the 28 years from 1850 to 1878, nearly two dozen ships were wrecked either on or near the bar at the mouth of Humboldt Bay, California. Notable rescues include:

- Passenger Steamer Corona 1906, all 96 passengers and 60 crew saved, two surfmen lost.
- U.S. Navy H-3 submarine grounded offshore with 27 crew and live torpedoes on December 14, 1916. Local contractor Mercer-Fraser later rolled the submarine over the sand dunes and back into the water on giant logs.
- U.S.S. Milwaukee sent to recover the H-3 was also stranded on January 13, 1917. 421 enlisted and 17 officers were saved.
- Yacht Rena swamped on June 23, 1939, within sight of the bar. Four were saved and the Chief and his crew received the Silver Medal, the second highest award for lifesaving for the rescue.
- The Brookley, the Tiverton and the Yellowstone, were three schooners which stranded, although all their passengers were saved.

== Buildings and railway ==
The Station received National Register status for significance in helping navigation and saving lives in the area of Humboldt Bay. It is considered the best example of 'Roosevelt Style,' a Colonial Revival station design that was used across the country from the late 1920s through the late 1940s, in the western United States. The Station has two 274 feet (84 m) long marine railways from the Station's rollup doors to below the low tide mark in the water to launch heavy surfboats. Marine railways were built starting in the early 20th century but became obsolete when larger steel lifeboats came into use in the 1970s. They represent the only set still in a functional Coast Guard Building on the Pacific coast.

Since 1994, the marine railway has displayed Motor Lifeboat #36515, which was decommissioned in 1982, donated to the Humboldt Bay Maritime Museum and returned as a monument. It has been used "from the late 1950s to the early 1980s."

Minor alterations were made to the west facade of the building in 1977, but the other faces are either not modified, or only slightly from the original plans. The interior was extensively altered from working spaces such as the boat room and a garage to offices, reception and classroom space. Upstairs the individual bedrooms have been combined to a single room and the mess hall and kitchens were also turned into office spaces.

== Current use ==
The Station continues in active use by the U.S. Coast Guard. Before 1977, summer air rescue in the area was done from the Coast Guard Air Station San Francisco, but the two-hour response time was too long for victims floundering in the typically 40–50 °F water so, on June 24, 1977, the Coast Guard Group / Air Station Humboldt Bay was commissioned with headquarters at a new $3.5 million facility at the Arcata-Eureka Airport in McKinleyville, California. The old Life-Saving station is an active part of the new search and rescue infrastructure.
