= Tuff-E-Nuff (tugboat) =

Coordinates: 27°15′58″N 80°00′59″W

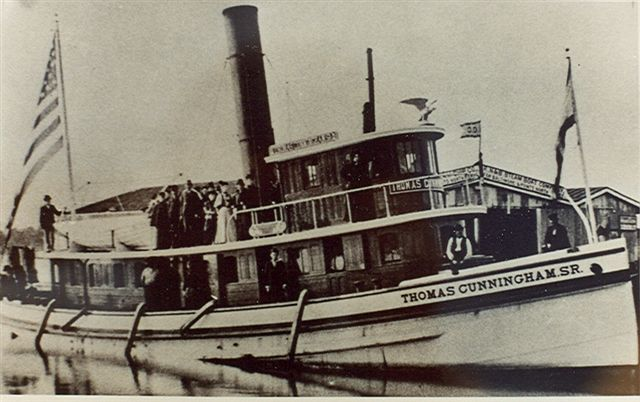
- Thomas Cunningham Sr., 1895

History
- Name: Thomas Cunningham Sr. (1895–?); Tuff-E-Nuff
- Builder: Neafie & Levy
- Cost: $21,000
- Yard number: 886
- Completed: 1895
- In service: 1895–c.2007
- Fate: Sunk as artificial reef January 2011

General characteristics
- Tonnage: 65 GT, 44 NT
- Length: 68 ft 6 in (20.88 m)
- Beam: 17 ft 1 in (5.21 m)
- Draft: 8 ft 7 in (2.62 m)
- Decks: 2
- Deck clearance: 34 ft 1 in (10.39 m)
- Installed power: Originally steam; replaced by diesel 1948
- Propulsion: Single screw
- Speed: 8 knots (15 km/h; 9.2 mph), cruising speed
- Capacity: Berthing for six
- Notes: Winch and Crane removed August 2008

Tuff-E-Nuff, originally known as Thomas Cunningham Sr., was a late 19th-century tugboat which had a remarkable 112-year commercial career. She was still operating as a working tugboat as recently as May 2007. She was sunk as an artificial reef in January 2011.

== History ==
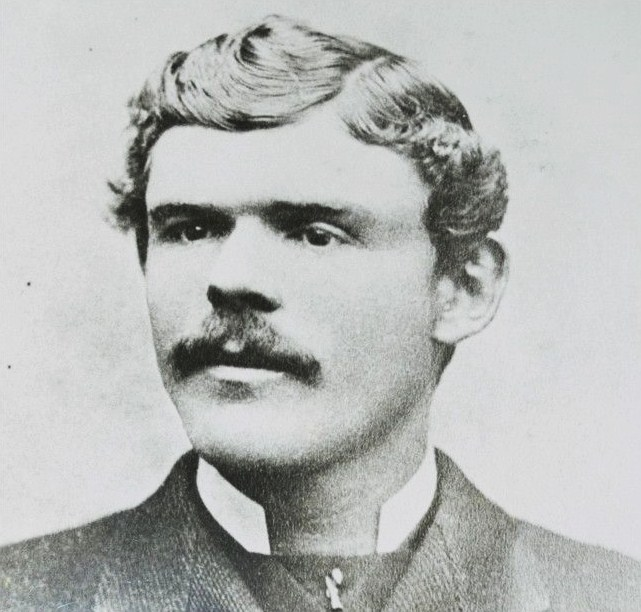
The tugboat's original namesake, Thomas Cunningham Sr.

Thomas Cunningham Sr. was built in 1895 by Neafie & Levy of Philadelphia, Pennsylvania for the Army Corps of Engineers. She was operated by the Harbour Board of the Port of Richmond, Virginia for more than eighty years.

After 45 years of service, Thomas Cunningham Sr. was sent to Newport News for the annual inspection where she was found unfit. Her papers were seized and she was suspended from duty until repairs were made. The main complaint was deck issues. The Richmond City Council quickly approved the budget extension for $8,000 to get the repairs completed and get their tug back.

Starting in late 1948, Thomas Cunningham Sr. finally got a much needed major refit. The wooden pilot house and deck were replaced with steel versions, and a 500 horsepower (370 kW) Cleveland 8-268A diesel engine was installed to replace the original steam engine. The entire cost of the project, including sending two maintenance people to the Cleveland factory for training, was $65,927.02. Out of the nine bidders for the work, Dunn's Marine Railway, Inc. of West Norfolk won the bid and completed the work approximately $11,000 under budget.

In 1977 the vessel was sold into private hands, and reportedly became a salvage tug in Florida. In May 2007, the tug was placed on the market by her owners, a salvage company, who were hoping to sell her to restorers. As of 2008, she was registered as a recreational vessel according to the United States Coast Guard's Port State Information eXchange.

As of September 2010, Tuff-E-Nuff was on a sandbar in Georgia; the organization Think It Sink It Reef It was working to sink the tug as an artificial reef.

On 17 January 2011, Tuff-E-Nuff was placed off St. Lucie, Florida as the Kyle Conrad Memorial Reef.

=== Mariners Museum collection ===
In 1951, the ship's original engine was acquired by the Mariners' Museum at Newport News, Virginia. The engine has since been restored to working order—albeit powered by electricity rather than steam—and was recently taken off exhibition and put into storage at the museum.

The engine is a two-cylinder compound type with an 18-inch (46 cm) stroke, and 206 indicated horsepower (154 kW). The high-pressure cylinder is 12 1/2 inches (32 cm) in diameter and the low-pressure cylinder is 24 inches (61 cm). The engine weighs approximately 14 tons and stands 10 feet 1 1/2 inches (3.086 m) high.

In addition to the engine, the museum also has on display a handcrafted 1:24 scale cutaway model of Thomas Cunningham Sr., as well as the original builder's plate for the engine.

=== Gallery of museum model ===
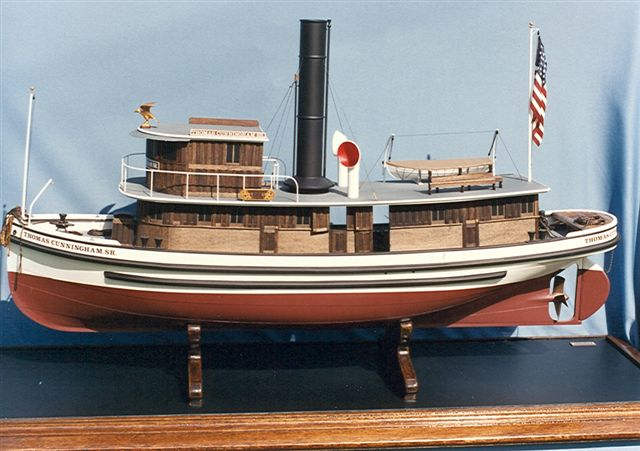
Model of Thomas Cunningham Sr. – port side

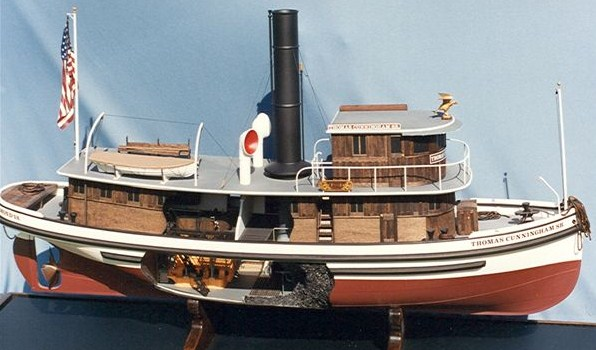
Starboard side of model with cutaway

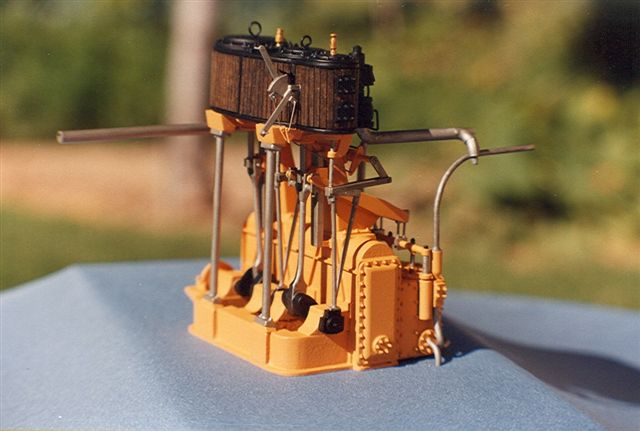
Model of the ship's original compound steam engine
