= USS Milwaukee (C-21) =

St. Louis-class cruiser

Coordinates: 40°48′44″N 124°11′54″W

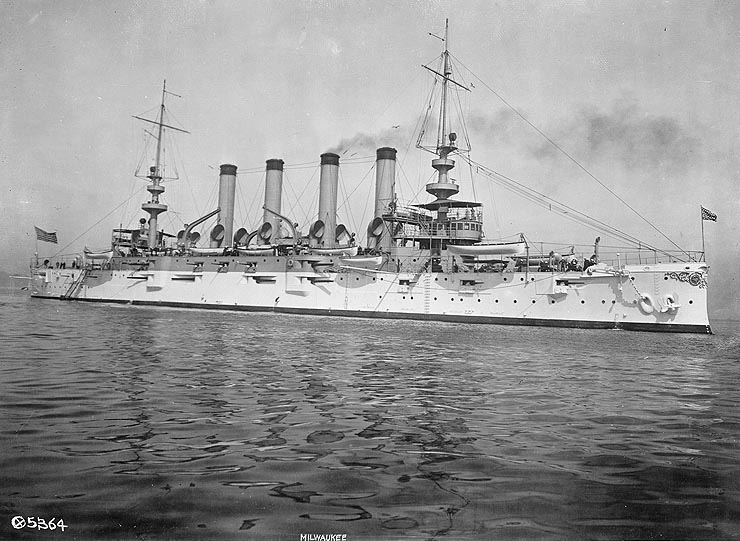
- USS Milwaukee (C-21) c. 1906-1908

History

United States
- Name: Milwaukee
- Namesake: City of Milwaukee, Wisconsin
- Ordered: 7 June 1900
- Awarded: 17 April 1901
- Builder: Union Iron Works, San Francisco, California
- Cost: $2,825,000 (contract price of hull and machinery)
- Laid down: 30 July 1902
- Launched: 10 September 1904
- Sponsored by: Miss Janet Mitchell, daughter of U.S. Senator John L. Mitchell of Wisconsin
- Completed: 17 April 1904
- Acquired: 6 December 1906
- Commissioned: 11 May 1906
- Decommissioned: 6 March 1917
- Stricken: 23 June 1919
- Identification: Hull symbol: C-21
- Fate: Stranded at Samoa Beach off Eureka, California, 13 January 1917; Sold as scrap, 5 August 1919

General characteristics (as built)
- Class & type: St. Louis-class protected cruiser
- Displacement: 9,700 long tons (9,856 t) (standard); 10,839 long tons (11,013 t) (full load)
- Length: 426 ft 6 in (130.00 m)oa; 424 ft (129 m)pp
- Beam: 66 ft (20 m)
- Draft: 22 ft 6 in (6.86 m) (mean)
- Installed power: 12 × Babcock & Wilcox boilers; 21,000 ihp (16,000 kW)
- Propulsion: 2 × vertical triple expansion reciprocating engines; 2 × screws
- Speed: 22 knots (41 km/h; 25 mph); 22.22 knots (41.15 km/h; 25.57 mph) (Speed on Trial)
- Armament: 14 × 6 in (152 mm)/50 caliber Mark 8 Breech-loading rifles; 18 × 3 in (76 mm)/50 cal guns; 12 ×3-pounder (47 mm (1.9 in)) saluting guns; 8 × 1-pounder 37 mm (1.5 in) rapid-fire guns; 4 × 1-pounder (37 mm) guns
- Armor: Belt armor: 4 in (100 mm); Deck (amidships): 2–3 in (51–76 mm); Shields: 4 in; Conning tower: 5 in (130 mm)

General characteristics (1918)
- Armament: 12 × 6 in/50 caliber Mark 8 breech-loading rifles; 4 × 3 in/50 caliber guns; 2 × 3 in/50 anti-aircraft guns; 4 × 3-pounder (47 mm) saluting guns

The second USS Milwaukee (C-21) was a St. Louis-class protected cruiser in the United States Navy. Entering service in 1906, Milwaukee was deployed to the Pacific Ocean. On 13 January 1917, while aiding a grounded submarine, the cruiser grounded herself. The ship was decommissioned and sold for scrap in 1919.

== Construction and commissioning ==
Milwaukee was laid down on 30 July 1902 by Union Iron Works at San Francisco, California, and launched on 10 September 1904, sponsored by Miss Janet Mitchell, daughter of U.S. Senator John L. Mitchell of Wisconsin. The cruiser was commissioned on 10 December 1906.

== Service history ==
After a shakedown cruise off the coast of California and Mexico, from 14 March through 28 May 1907, Milwaukee departed San Francisco, California on 26 June 1907 and cruised off the coast of San Salvador and Costa Rica and engaging in target practice with the squadron in Magdalena Bay. On 26 March 1908, the cruiser sailed from San Francisco for Bremerton, Washington, where she was placed in reserve on 25 April. Except for a cruise in the summer of 1908 which took her to Hawaii and to Honduras, the ship remained in reserve status at Puget Sound Navy Yard until decommissioned on 3 May 1910.

Milwaukee was recommissioned in ordinary service on 17 June 1913 and was assigned to the Pacific Reserve Fleet. In the next two years the ship made several brief cruises, one to Honolulu with a detachment of Washington State Naval Militia from 1–22 July 1914, and several along the coast of California. On 18 March 1916, Milwaukee was detached from the Reserve Fleet and assigned to duty as a tender to destroyers and submarines of the Pacific Fleet. Based at San Diego, the cruiser participated in exercises and maneuvers off the coast, patrolled Mexican waters, transported refugees, and performed survey duty.

Milwaukee was then overhauled at Mare Island including the installation of heavy machine tools so the cruiser could act as a tender for the Coast Torpedo Force of destroyers and submarines.

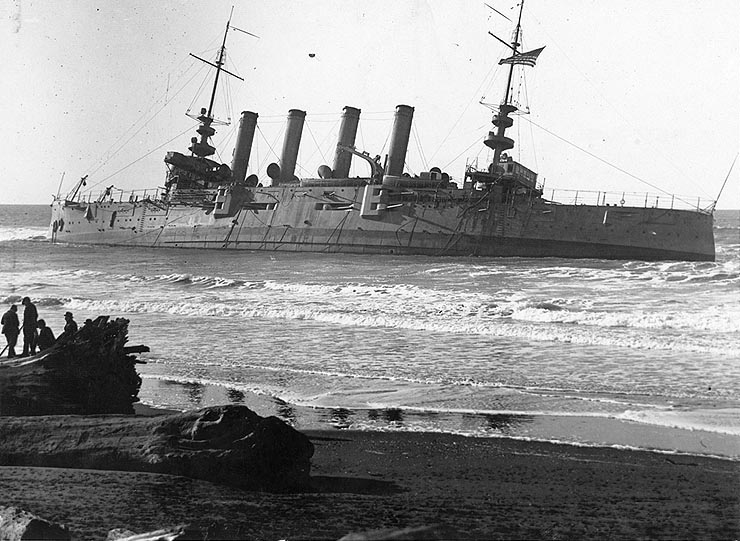
Milwaukee beached at Eureka, California, in January 1917 after attempting to free the submarine H-3.

=== The wreck of Milwaukee ===
Under the temporary command of Lieutenant William F. Newton acting as Coast Torpedo Force Commander, Milwaukee sailed on 5 January 1917 for Eureka, California, to assist in salvaging the U.S. Navy submarine H-3 which had run aground off Humboldt Bay on 14 December 1916. On 13 January, while attempting to float the submarine and disregarding the recommendations of local mariners, the cruiser stranded in the first line of breakers at Samoa, California, off Eureka. Four hundred twenty-one enlisted men and seventeen officers were rescued safely by the Humboldt Bay Life-Saving Station and local volunteers but attempts to salvage the ship were unsuccessful. H-3 was ultimately salvaged and returned to service.

=== Decommissioning and fate ===
Milwaukee was decommissioned on 6 March 1917 and a storm in November 1918 broke the ship in two. Her name was struck from the Naval Vessel Register 23 June 1919 and her hulk was sold on 5 August 1919.

== Bibliography ==
- Haislip, Harvey, CAPT USN (February 1967). "The Valor of Inexperience". United States Naval Institute Proceedings.
