= USS H-3 =

H-class submarine of the United States

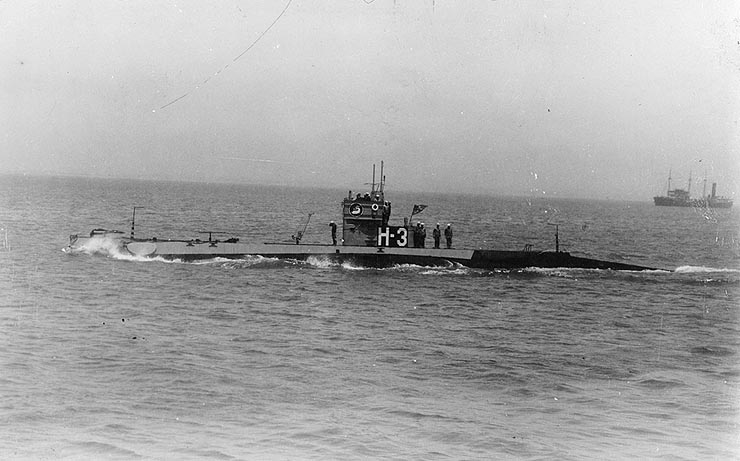
- USS H-3, ex-Garfish, underway, c. 1922

History

United States
- Name: Garfish
- Namesake: The gar
- Builder: The Moran Company, Seattle, Washington
- Cost: $512,247.35 (hull and machinery)
- Laid down: 3 April 1911
- Launched: 3 July 1913
- Sponsored by: Miss Helen MacEwan
- Commissioned: 16 January 1914
- Decommissioned: 23 October 1922
- Renamed: H-3 (Submarine No.30), 17 November 1911
- Identification: Hull symbol: SS-30 (17 July 1920); Call sign: NYE
- Fate: Sold for scrapping, 14 September 1931

General characteristics
- Type: H-class submarine
- Displacement: 358 long tons (364 t) surfaced; 467 long tons (474 t) submerged
- Length: 150 ft 4 in (45.82 m)
- Beam: 15 ft 10 in (4.83 m)
- Draft: 12 ft 5 in (3.78 m)
- Installed power: 950 hp (710 kW) (diesel engines); 600 hp (450 kW) (electric motors)
- Propulsion: 2 × NELSECO diesel engines; 2 × Electro Dynamic electric motors; 2 × 60-cell batteries; 2 × Propellers
- Speed: 14 kn (26 km/h; 16 mph) surfaced; 10.5 kn (19.4 km/h; 12.1 mph) submerged
- Range: 2,300 nmi (4,300 km; 2,600 mi) at 11 kn (20 km/h; 13 mph) surfaced; 100 nmi (190 km; 120 mi) at 5 kn (9.3 km/h; 5.8 mph) submerged
- Test depth: 200 ft (61 m)
- Capacity: 11,800 US gal (45,000 L; 9,800 imp gal) fuel
- Complement: 2 officers; 23 enlisted
- Armament: 4 × 18 inch (450 mm) bow torpedo tubes (8 torpedoes)

USS Garfish/H-3 (SS-30), also known as "Submarine No. 30", was an H-class submarine of the United States Navy (USN). As of October 2025, she has been the only ship of the USN to be named for the gar, a popular target for recreational anglers, though she was renamed H-3 prior to launching.

== Design ==
The H-class submarines had an overall length of 150 ft 4 in (45.8 m), a beam of 15 ft 10 in (4.8 m), and a mean draft of 12 ft 5 in (3.8 m). They displaced 358 long tons (364 t) on the surface and 467 long tons (474 t) submerged. They had a diving depth of 200 ft (61.0 m). The boats had a crew of 2 officers and 23 enlisted men.

For surface running, they were powered by two New London Ship & Engine Company 475-brake-horsepower (354 kW) diesel engines, each driving one propeller shaft. When submerged each propeller was driven by two 170-horsepower (127 kW) Electro-Dynamic Company electric motors. They could reach 14 kn (26 km/h; 16 mph) on the surface and 10.5 kn (19.4 km/h; 12.1 mph) underwater. On the surface, the boats had a range of 2,300 nmi (4,300 km; 2,600 mi) at 11 kn (20 km/h; 13 mph) and 100 nmi (190 km; 120 mi) at 5 kn (9.3 km/h; 5.8 mph) submerged.

The boats were armed with four 18-inch (450 mm) torpedo tubes in the bow. They carried four reloads, for a total of eight torpedoes.

== Construction ==
Garfish's keel was laid down on 3 April 1911, by The Moran Company, in Seattle, Washington. She was renamed H-3 on 17 November 1911, and launched on 3 July 1913, sponsored by Miss Helen MacEwan. H-3 was commissioned at Puget Sound Navy Yard, on 16 January 1914.

== Service history ==
After shakedown, H-3 was attached to the Pacific Fleet and began operations along the West Coast from lower California to Washington, exercising frequently with her sister ships H-1 and H-2.

While engaged in operations off the northern California coast near Eureka, with the protected cruiser Milwaukee and the ex-monitor, now submarine tender, Cheyenne, H-3 ran aground in heavy fog while attempting to enter Humboldt Bay on the morning of 14 December 1916. The crew were rescued by Coast Guard Humboldt Bay Life-Saving Station; many were brought to shore by breeches buoy. Storm surf pushed H-3 high up on a sandy beach, surrounded by quicksand. At low tide, she was 75 ft (23 m) from the water, but at high tide, the ocean reached almost 250 ft (76 m) beyond her. The submarine crew pitched camp on the Samoa, beach, near their stranded submarine, while the tug Iroquois steamed from Mare Island Navy Yard to attempt salvage. Combined efforts of Iroquois and Cheyenne were unable to dislodge H-3, so both ships returned to Mare Island, while the Navy requested bids from commercial salvage firms. Only two bids were received. The largest marine salvage firm on the west coast offered to pull the submarine into deep water offshore for $150,000 and the Mercer-Fraser Company, of Eureka, offered to pull the submarine over the Samoa peninsula, into Humboldt Bay, for $18,000.

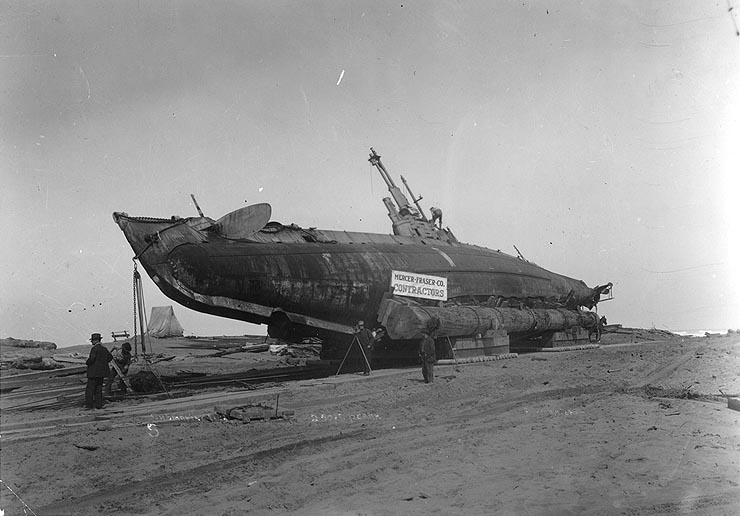
H-3 during salvage operations, 6 April 1917

Navy officials at Mare Island regarded the lumber company proposal as infeasible and felt the salvage firm bid was excessive. Milwaukee sailed from Mare Island, on 5 January 1917, to tow H-3 off the beach. Milwaukee grounded attempting salvage on 13 January 1917, and she subsequently broke in two during a storm in November 1918.

H-3 was temporarily decommissioned on 4 February, while the lumber company salvage bid was accepted. H-3 was placed on giant log rollers and taken overland to be relaunched into Humboldt Bay on 20 April.

She then returned to San Pedro, California, where she served as flagboat of Submarine Division 7 (SubDiv 7), participating in exercises and operations along the coast until 1922. H-3, with the entire division, sailed from San Pedro, on 25 July, and reached Hampton Roads, on 14 September.

== Fate ==
H-3 decommissioned at Hampton Roads on 23 October. She was struck from the Naval Vessel Register on 18 December 1930, and scrapped on 14 September 1931.

== Bibliography ==
- "Table 21 - Ships on Navy List June 30, 1919". Congressional Serial Set. U.S. Government Printing Office: 766. 1921.
- Priolo, Gary. "Garfish / H-3 (SS-30)". Navsource.net.
- Friedman, Norman (1995). U.S. Submarines Through 1945: An Illustrated Design History. Annapolis, Maryland: Naval Institute Press. ISBN 1-55750-263-3.
- Gardiner, Robert & Gray, Randal (1985). Conway's All the World's Fighting Ships 1906–1921. Annapolis, Maryland: Naval Institute Press. ISBN 0-85177-245-5.
- "H-3 (SS-30)". Dictionary of American Naval Fighting Ships. Navy Department, Naval History and Heritage Command. 16 August 2024. This article incorporates text from this source, which is in the public domain.
- Haislip, Harvey CAPT USN (February 1967). "The Valor of Inexperience". Proceedings of the United States Naval Institute.
