= List of museums in the North Coast (California) =

The North Coast of California is located on the Pacific coast in between the San Francisco Bay and the Oregon border and includes Del Norte, Humboldt, Lake, and Mendocino counties.

This list of North Coast, California museums, defined for this context as institutions (in nonprofit organizations, government entities, and private businesses) that collect and care for objects of cultural, artistic, scientific, or historical interest and make their collections or related exhibits available for public viewing can include non-profit and university art galleries. Museums that exist only in cyberspace (i.e., virtual museums) are not included.

To use the sortable tables: click on the icons at the top of each column to sort that column in alphabetical order; click again for reverse alphabetical order.

== Museums ==
Name	Image	Town/City	County	Type	Summary
Anderson Marsh State Historic Park		Lower Lake	Lake	Historic house	Contains Ranch House, an example of early California living
Anderson Valley Historical Society Museum		Boonville	Mendocino	Local history	website
Arcata Marsh Interpretive Center		Arcata	Humboldt	Natural history	Exhibits about the natural history and importance of the marsh and the operations of the waste water treatment plant
Battery Point Light		Crescent City	Del Norte	Lighthouse	Lighthouse and museum
Blue Lake Museum		Blue Lake	Humboldt	Local history	Photos and artifacts of Blue Lake pioneers, local Native American, logging and railroad history
Blue Ox Millworks and Historic Park		Eureka	Humboldt	Local history	website, historic park with working craftsmen's areas and a current-day mill and woodworking operation
Clarke Historical Museum		Eureka	Humboldt	Local history	Formerly the Clarke Memorial Museum, history of Humboldt County with emphasis on the late 19th century, includes furniture, glassware, clothing and Native American wing
Del Norte County Historical Society Museum		Crescent City	Del Norte	Local history	website, includes Native American baskets, Tolowa and Yurok artifacts, musical instruments, old radio, phonographic and photographic equipment, needlework, logging and mining tools and equipment, fashions and furniture
Discovery Museum of Eureka		Eureka	Humboldt	Children's	non-profit children's museum website
Ely Stage Stop and Country Museum		Kelseyville	Lake	Local history	website, operated by the Lake County Historical Society
Fern Cottage		Ferndale	Humboldt	Historic house	website, 1866 house museum and events venue with original furnishings, gardens and historic outbuildings
Ferndale Museum		Ferndale	Humboldt	Local history	Period rooms, antiques, Native American artifacts, dollhouses, switchboards, telephones, farm equipment, working Bosch-Omori seismograph, working Blacksmith shop, mid-century barbershop, dairy equipment, equestrian gear, art by local notable artists, and wainwright shop. Research collections include family histories, photographs, newspapers, cemetery and city records, and books
First Street Gallery		Eureka	Humboldt	Art	Operated by Humboldt State University
Ford House Museum		Mendocino	Mendocino	Local history	Visitor and interpretive center for Mendocino Headlands State Park
Fort Humboldt State Historic Park		Eureka	Humboldt	Fort	History of the mid 19th century fort, interactions between European Americans and Native Americans, logging equipment and local narrow gauge railroad history of the region
Fortuna Depot Museum		Fortuna	Humboldt	Local history	website, history of the Eel River Valley, includes memorabilia from railroad, farm and war eras, including large locks, spark plugs, and barbed wire displays, a doll collection and many types of fishing gear and lures
Grace Hudson Museum and Sun House		Ukiah	Mendocino	Multiple	Art, history, and anthropology museum focusing on the lifeworks of artist Grace Carpenter Hudson (1865–1937) and her ethnologist husband, Dr. John W. Hudson (1857–1936)
Guest House Museum		Fort Bragg	Mendocino	Local history	website, operated by the Fort Bragg – Mendocino Coast Historical Society
Hoopa Tribal Museum		Hoopa	Humboldt	Native American	
HSU Art Galleries		Arcata	Humboldt	Art	website, includes the Reese Bullen Gallery in the Humboldt State University Art Building, the Native American Arts Gallery in the Behavioral & Social Science Building and the First Street Gallery
Humboldt Bay Maritime Museum		Samoa	Humboldt	Maritime	Madaket historic ship, displays
Humboldt State University Natural History Museum		Arcata	Humboldt	Natural history	Exhibits include the redwood forest, plant evolution, area fossils, seashells, insects, marine life
Kelley House Museum		Mendocino	Mendocino	Historic house	website, interprets Mendocino's logging and shipping industries
Lakeport Historic Courthouse Museum		Lakeport	Lake	Local history	County history, Pomo basket and artifacts collection, gems and minerals, Victorian parlor, hunting and camping, courthouse history
Lower Lake Schoolhouse Museum		Lower Lake	Lake	Local history	Includes local pioneer and Native American artifacts, rocks and minerals
Mendocino County Museum		Willits	Mendocino	Local history	website
Morris Graves Museum of Art		Eureka	Humboldt	Art	Arts and artists of the Pacific Northwest, particularly Morris Graves
Phillips House Museum		Arcata	Humboldt	Historic house	website, operated by the Historical Sites Society of Arcata, shows the daily life of an Arcata resident between 1854 and 1932
Point Cabrillo Light		Ukiah	Mendocino	Maritime	Lighthouse open for tours
Samoa Cookhouse Museum		Eureka	Humboldt	Industry	website, area logging activities, part of the Samoa Cookhouse historic restaurant
Scotia Logging Museum		Scotia	Humboldt	Industry	website, museum about the logging company town once owned by Pacific Lumber Company
Sea Glass Museum		Fort Bragg	Mendocino	Local History	website, history of Fort Bragg's sea glass beaches, sea glass displays and photos, privately owned
Stone House Museum		Hidden Valley Lake	Lake	Historic house	Mid-19th century house, oldest building in the county, operated by the Stone House Historical Society
Stone Lagoon Schoolhouse Museum		Trinidad	Humboldt	Local history	Operated by the Society for California Archaeology, exhibits of Native American artifacts, local history
Trees of Mystery		Klamath	Del Norte	Native American	Roadside attraction that includes the End of the Trail Museum, which features Native American art, crafts and tools
Triangle Tattoo & Museum		Fort Bragg	Mendocino	Art	website, display of tattoo artifacts from around the world
Trinidad Museum		Trinidad	Humboldt	Local history	website
Willow Creek – China Flat Museum		Willow Creek	Humboldt	Local history	website, local and Native American history, special Bigfoot collection
Wooden Sculpture Garden of Romano Gabriel		Eureka	Humboldt	Art	website, folk art sculpture garden, operated by the Eureka Heritage Society

== Defunct museums ==
- Ship Ashore Gift Shop & Museum, Smith River

== See also ==
- List of museums in California
