= Humboldt Arts Council =

The Humboldt Arts Council (HAC) is the official Humboldt County, California, USA arts council located in the Morris Graves Museum of Art (MGMA).

Organized in 1966 and incorporated in 1971. It is a 501(c)(3) nonprofit corporation dedicated to providing opportunities for artists, developing arts education, and making the arts accessible through innovative and multicultural programs. The council, as Humboldt County's largest multidisciplinary arts organization, focuses on working in partnership with artists, arts organizations, community groups, and schools to strengthen the arts’ accessibility and impact as aesthetic, personal and social resources. The Council envisions that the importance of art will be evident in all aspects of life in Humboldt County, including homes, schools, businesses, and government. The council is dedicated to providing leadership in support of the rich heritage of the arts on California's North Coast, and to bringing this legacy fully into community life.

In 1987, HAC became the State Local Partner for the California Arts Council and the community representative for the California State Summer School for the Arts Program.

In 1996 the Humboldt Arts Council accepted an offer from the City of Eureka to save the historic 1904 Carnegie Library building, which was destined for demolition. The former Carnegie Library had been a symbol of community pride and local culture for over 100 years. After the successful Carnegie Capital Campaign to raise $1.5 million from the local community, foundations and corporations, the council began restoration in 1999 converting the historic Carnegie building into a regional art museum and art center. On January 1, 2000, the Humboldt Arts Council and the community celebrated with a ribbon cutting ceremony to dedicate the Morris Graves Museum of Art (MGMA) for its new “Century of Service” to the community.

== Morris Graves Museum of Art ==
- Morris Graves Museum of Art
- U.S. National Register of Historic Places
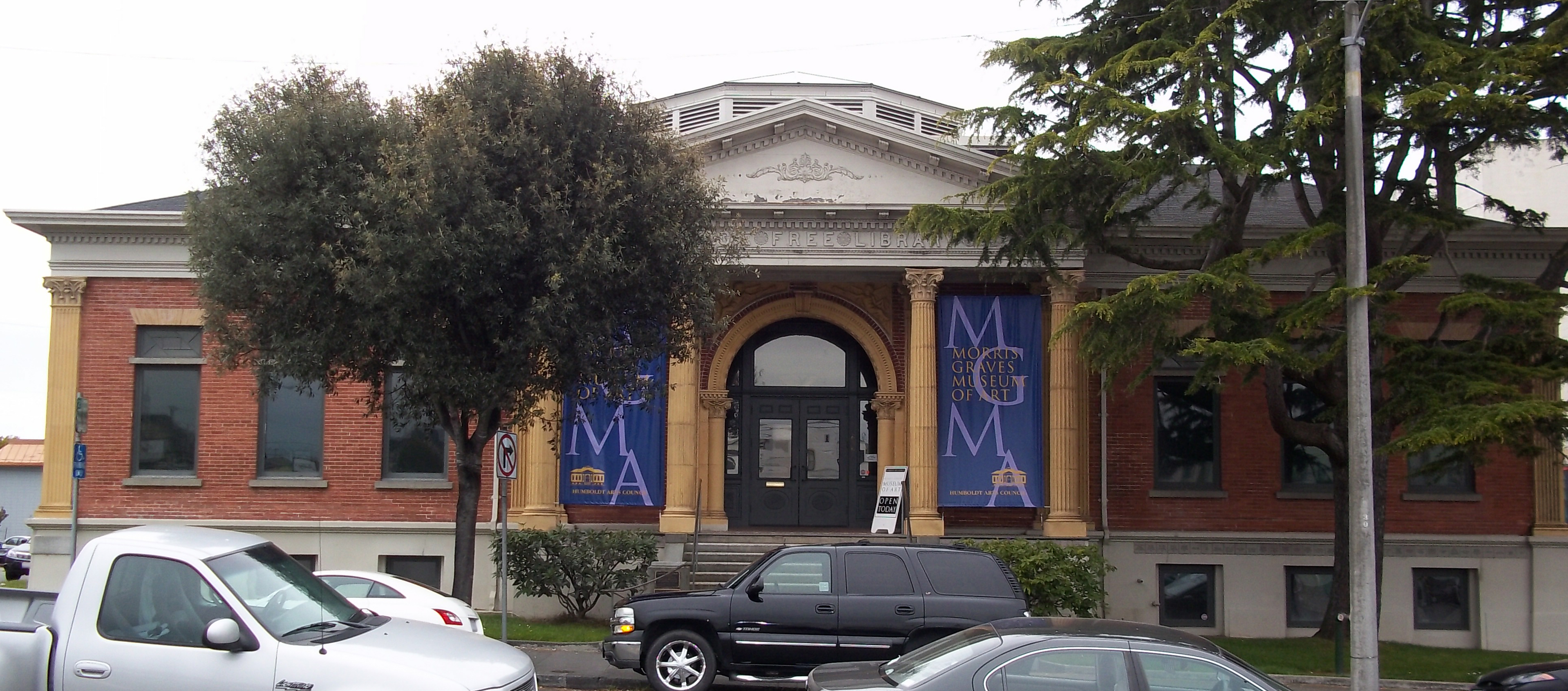

- Location within California
- Location: 636 F St., Eureka, California
- Coordinates: 40°48′2″N 124°9′52″W
- Area: 0.3 acres (0.12 ha)
- Built: 1902
- Architect: Evans, Knowles & Trarver, B.C.; Foster, Ambrose
- Architectural style: Classical Revival
- NRHP reference No.: 86000101
- Added to NRHP: January 23, 1986

The Morris Graves Museum of Art was named after Morris Graves, a painter and founder of the Northwest School of Art in the Pacific Northwest. Prior to his death in 2001, he donated a substantial portion of his personal art collection, including some of his own works, and the use of his name to help with creation of the museum. It is located in the refurbished Eureka Carnegie Library building, which was the first Carnegie Library completed in California in 1904.

The museum is a member of the North American Reciprocal Museums program.

== See also ==
- List of Museums in the North Coast (California)
- Clarke Historical Museum
- Humboldt Bay Maritime Museum
- Humboldt County Historical Society
