= Old Town Eureka =

Historical commercial center of Eureka, California

- Old Town Eureka (Eureka Old Town Historic District)
- U.S. National Register of Historic Places
- U.S. Historic district
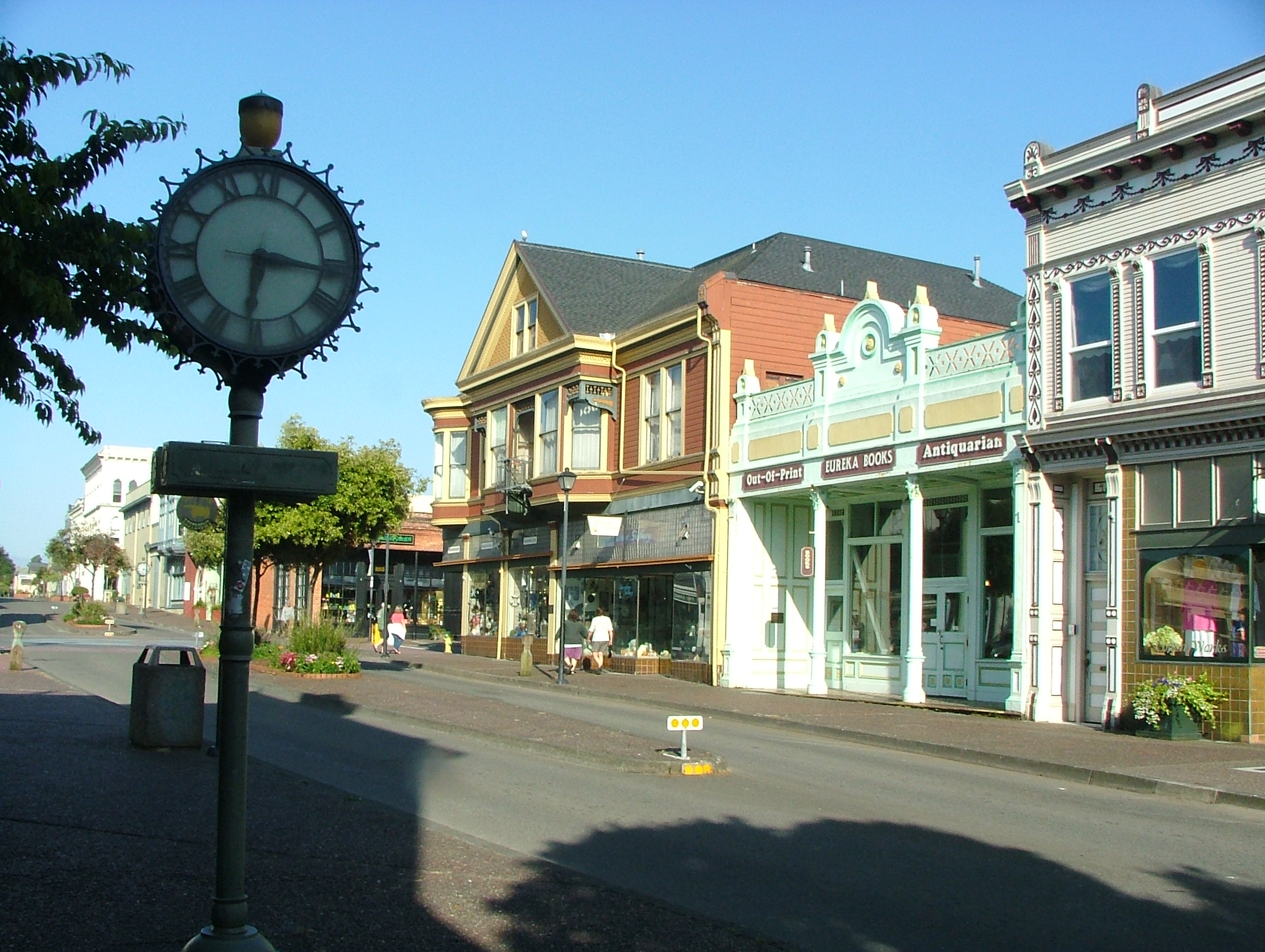
- Near 2nd & "F" Streets in Old Town

- Location within California Location within the United States
- Location: Eureka, California – Roughly, 1st, 2nd, & 3rd Streets, between B and M Streets
- Coordinates: 40°48′13.34″N 124°9′59.04″W
- Built: 1850–1874, 1875–1899, 1900–1924, 1925–1949
- Architect: Multiple
- Architectural style: Victorian, Greek Revival, Classical Revival (Neoclassical)
- Website: https://visiteureka.com/activities/old-town-waterfront/
- NRHP reference No.: 91001523
- Added to NRHP: 1991

Old Town Eureka (formally the Eureka Old Town Historic District) in Eureka, California, is a historic district listed on the United States National Register of Historic Places. It is a 350-acre (1.4 km^{2}) area containing 154 buildings mostly from the Victorian era. The core of the district runs the length of First, Second, and Third Streets, between "C" and "M" Streets, and includes many types of architecture including Eastlake, Queen Ann, Greek Revival, Classical Revival, and Second Empire styles from the 1850s to the 20th century. Though not officially within the district, the Carson Mansion commands the highest elevation at the eastern edge of the district.

== History ==
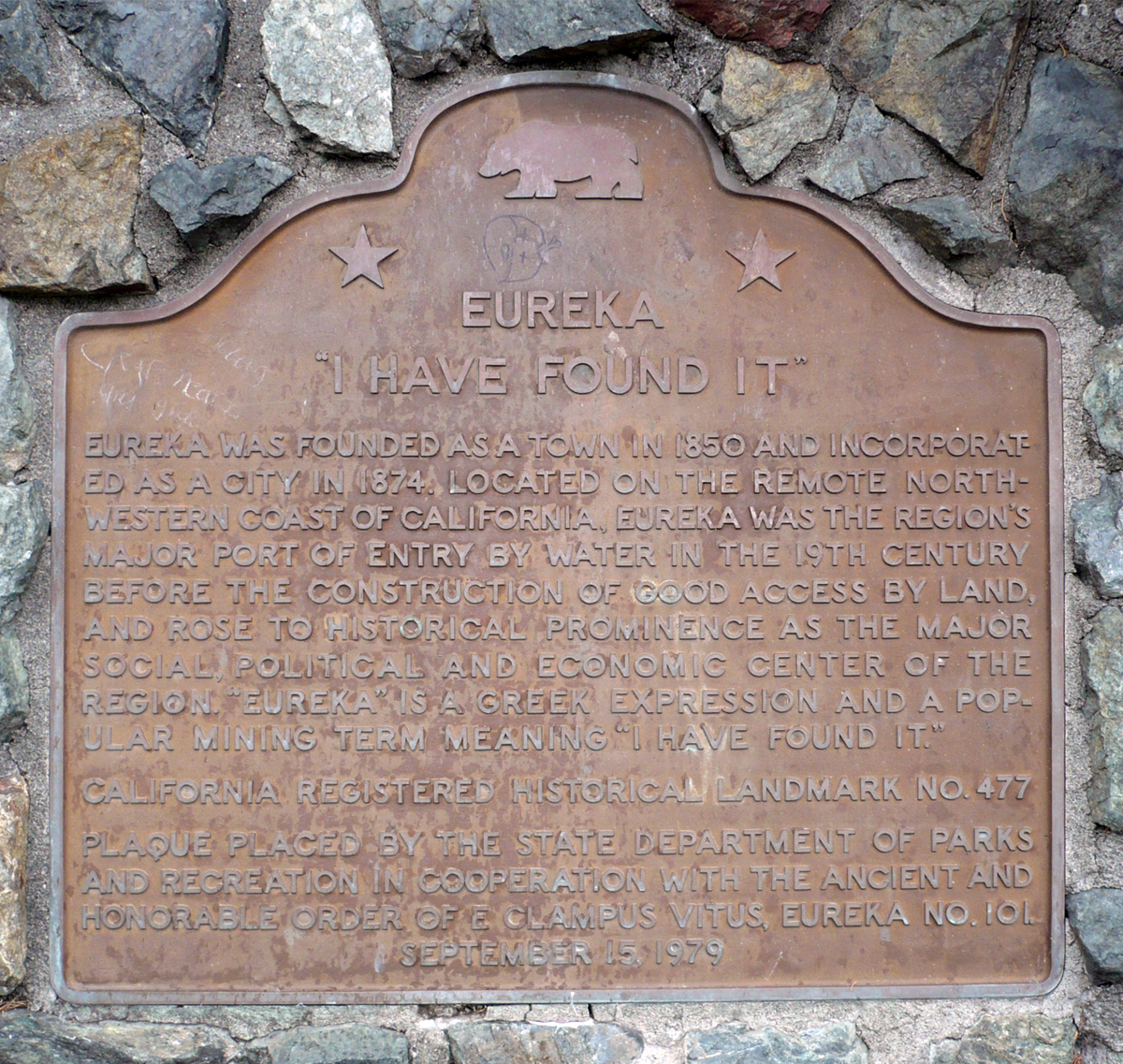
Eureka's California State Historical marker, #477 is located on a plaque near the intersection of Third and "E" Streets

The city began as an 1850 settlement on the edge of Humboldt Bay. Developers and settlers planned for Eureka to aid in the provision of miners working inland to the east. By 1865, the central core of what would become Eureka's "Old Town" was considered "a lively place for a small town, full of business and with plenty of money." The roads beyond Second street (the equivalent of "Main" Street) were covered with stumps from the (recently logged) Redwood forest, and had not opened yet. Old Town Eureka was named as one of the 100 best art towns in America. Within its bounds is the Clarke Historical Museum.

== Examples of historic architecture in Old Town ==
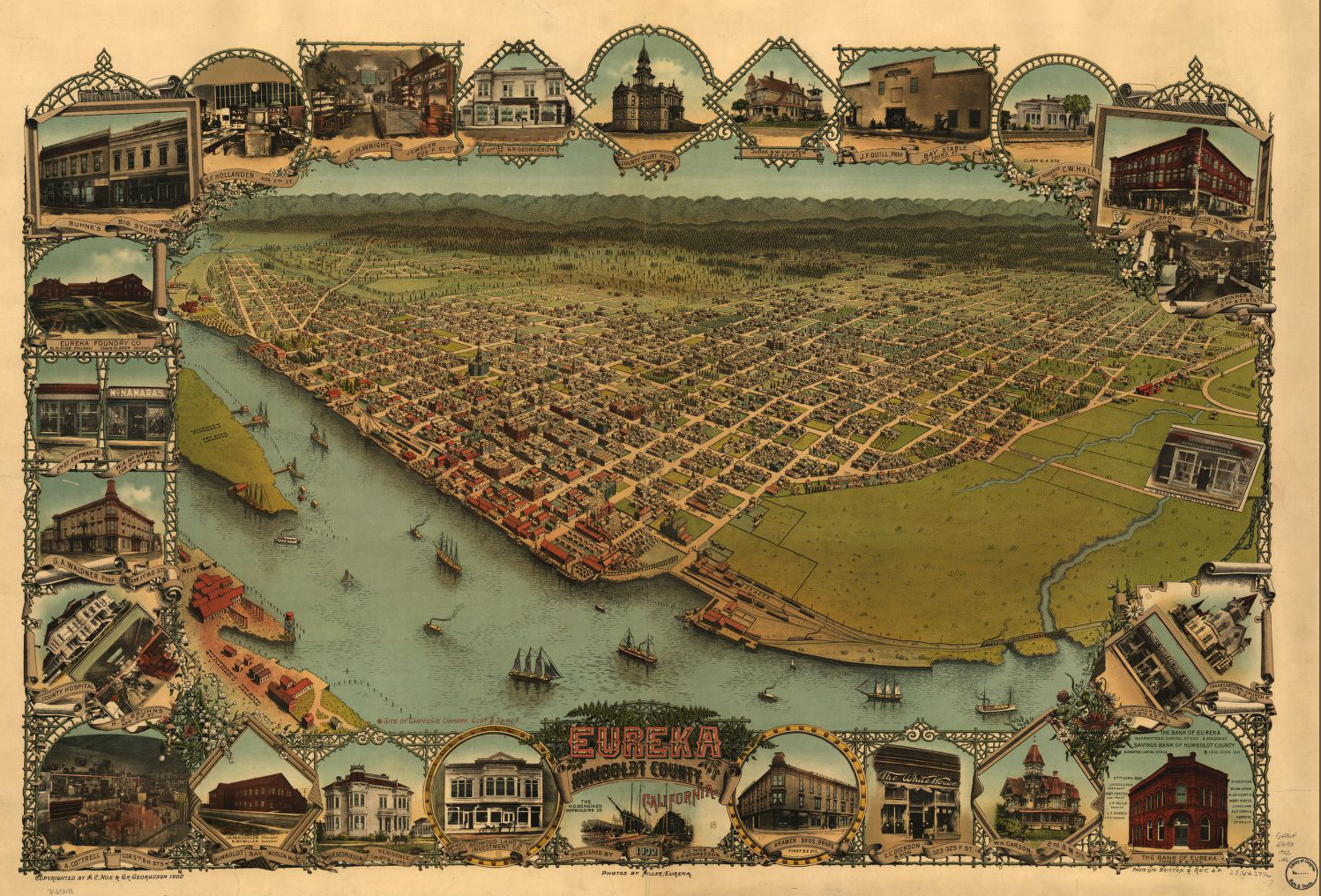
1902 Illustration of City of Eureka. Old Town is the area of the city, primarily on the waterfront near the island at left.

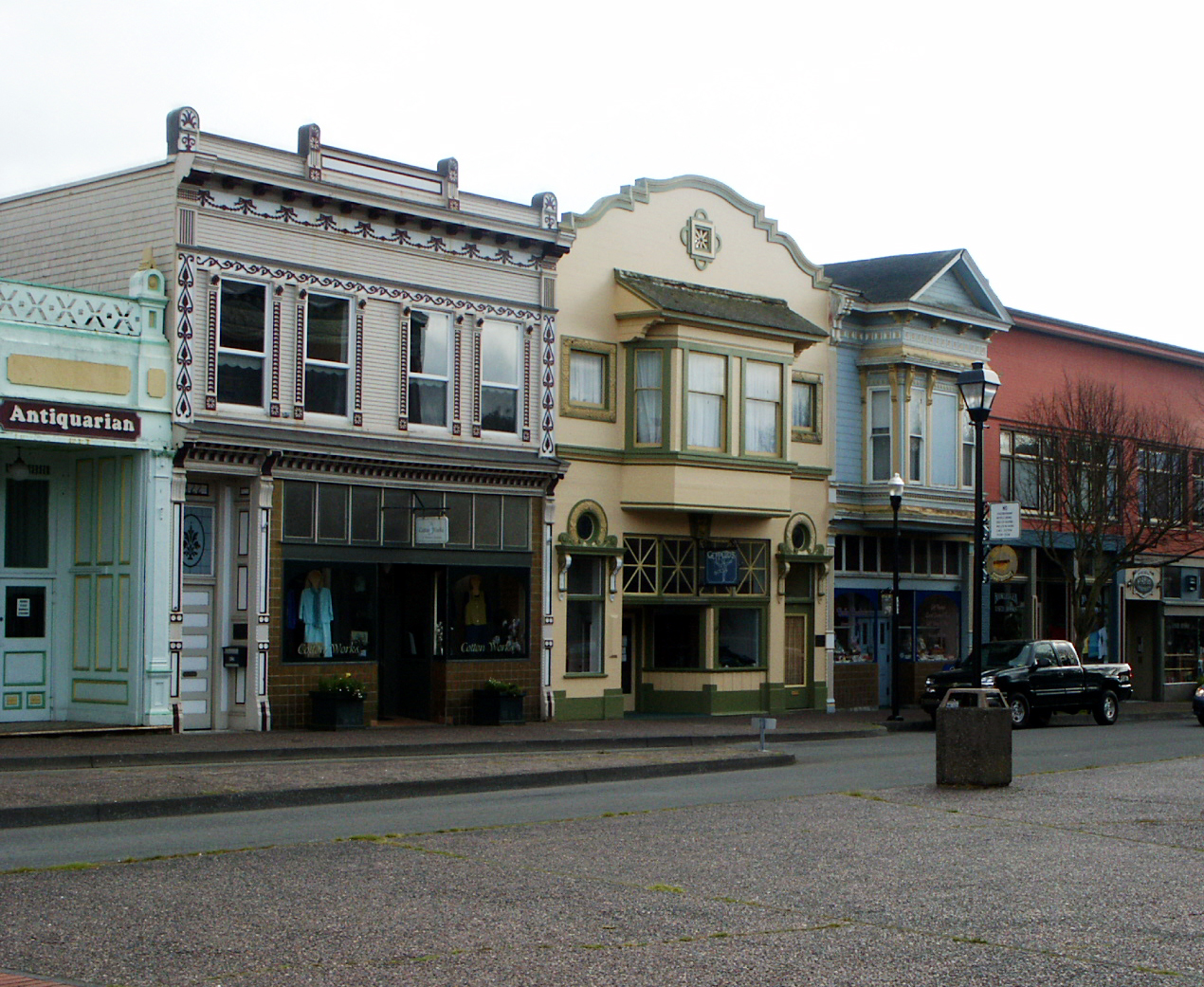
Victorian Commercial buildings on the south side of Second Street.

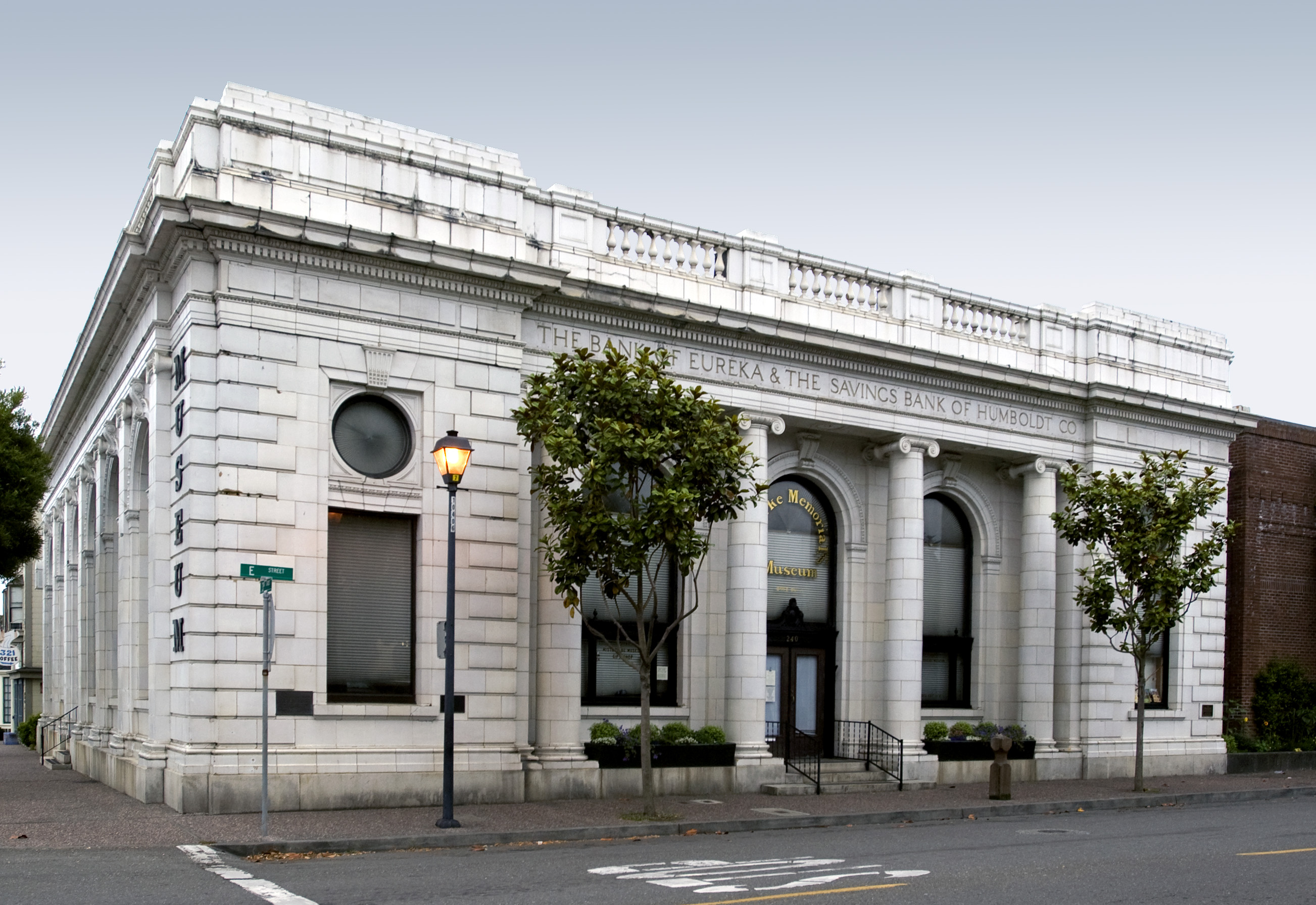
The Clarke Historical Museum, located in the former Bank of Eureka, designed by Albert Pissis, 1911.

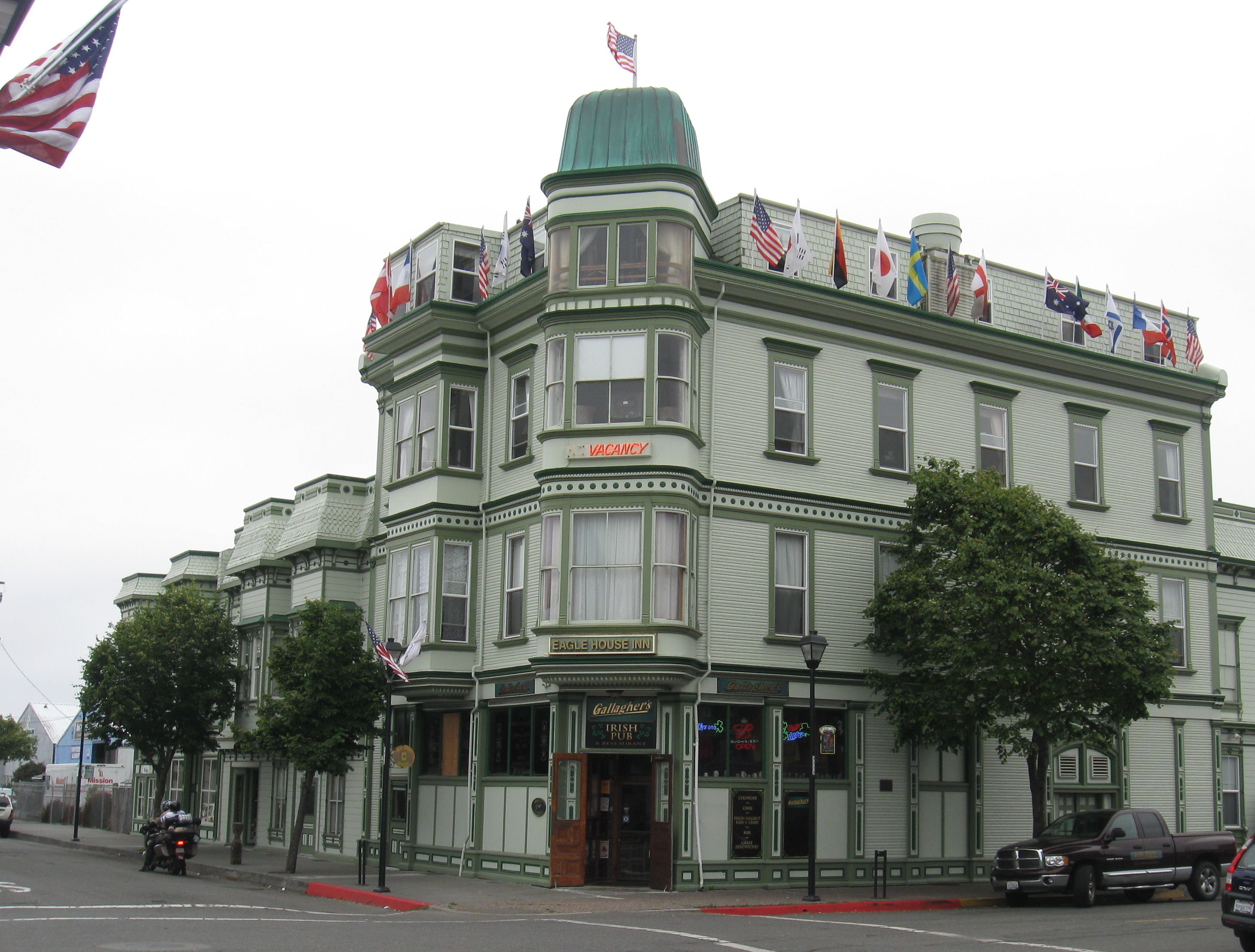
The Buon Gusto (Eagle House) Hotel from the era when travel to Humboldt Bay was primarily by ship. Docks for ships from San Francisco were nearby this corner, which at one time had four hotels.

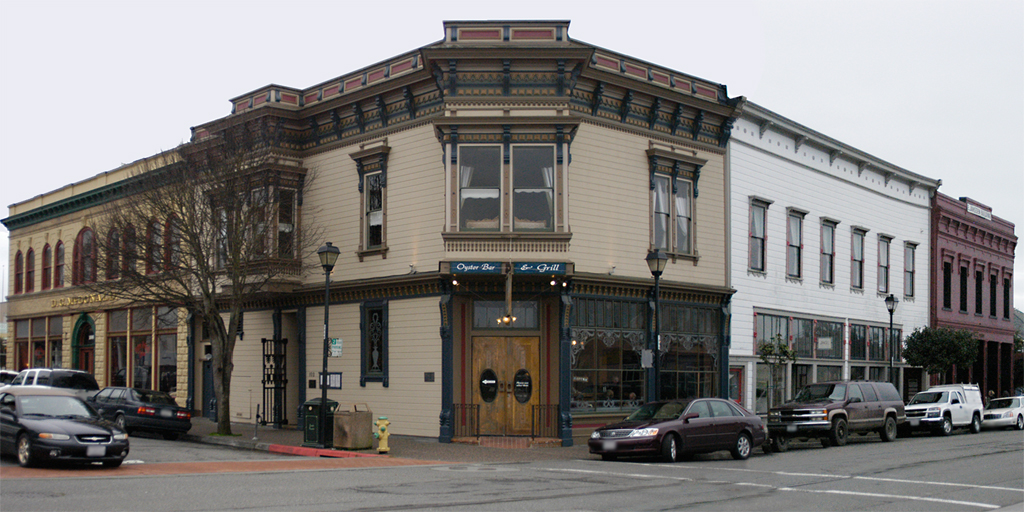
1893–1904 Commercial Buildings

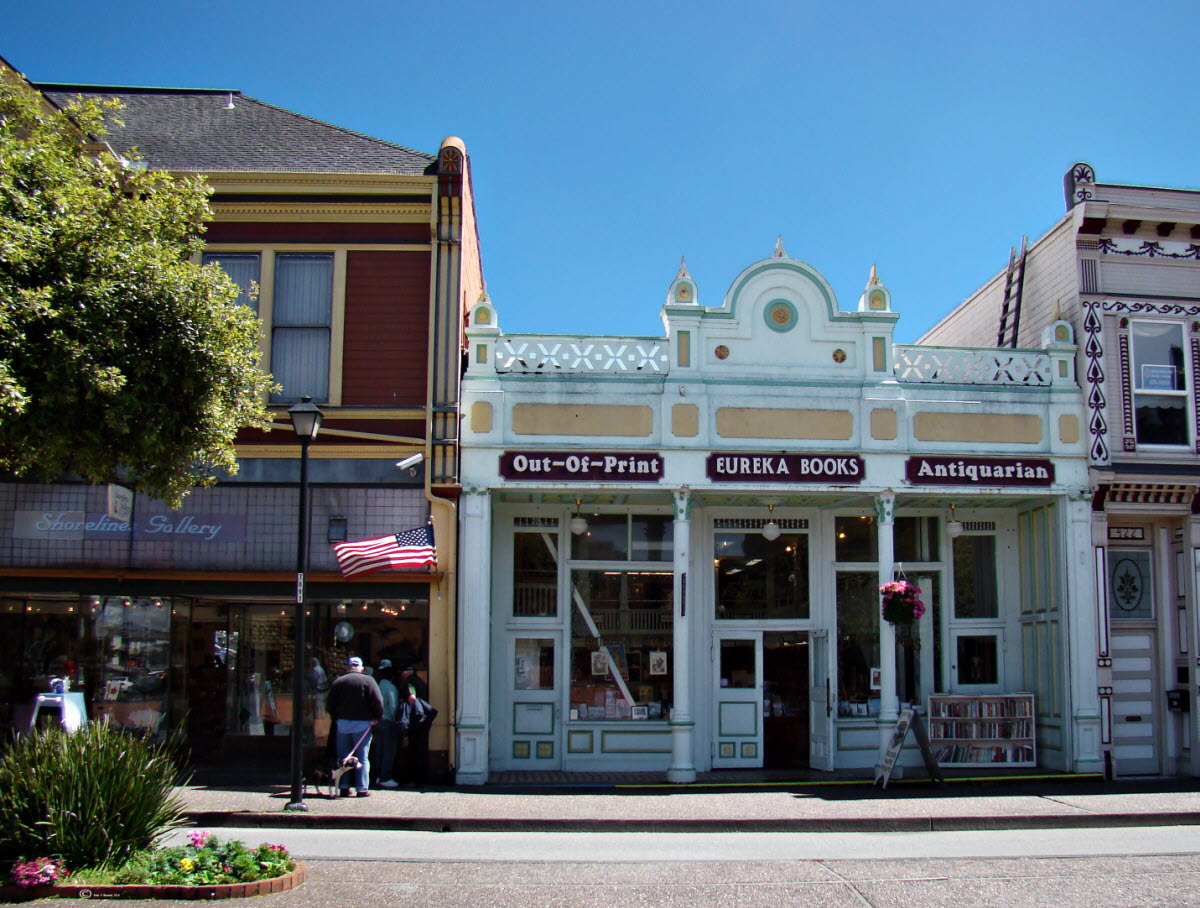
Bookstore: A Late 1870s Store Front on Second Street.

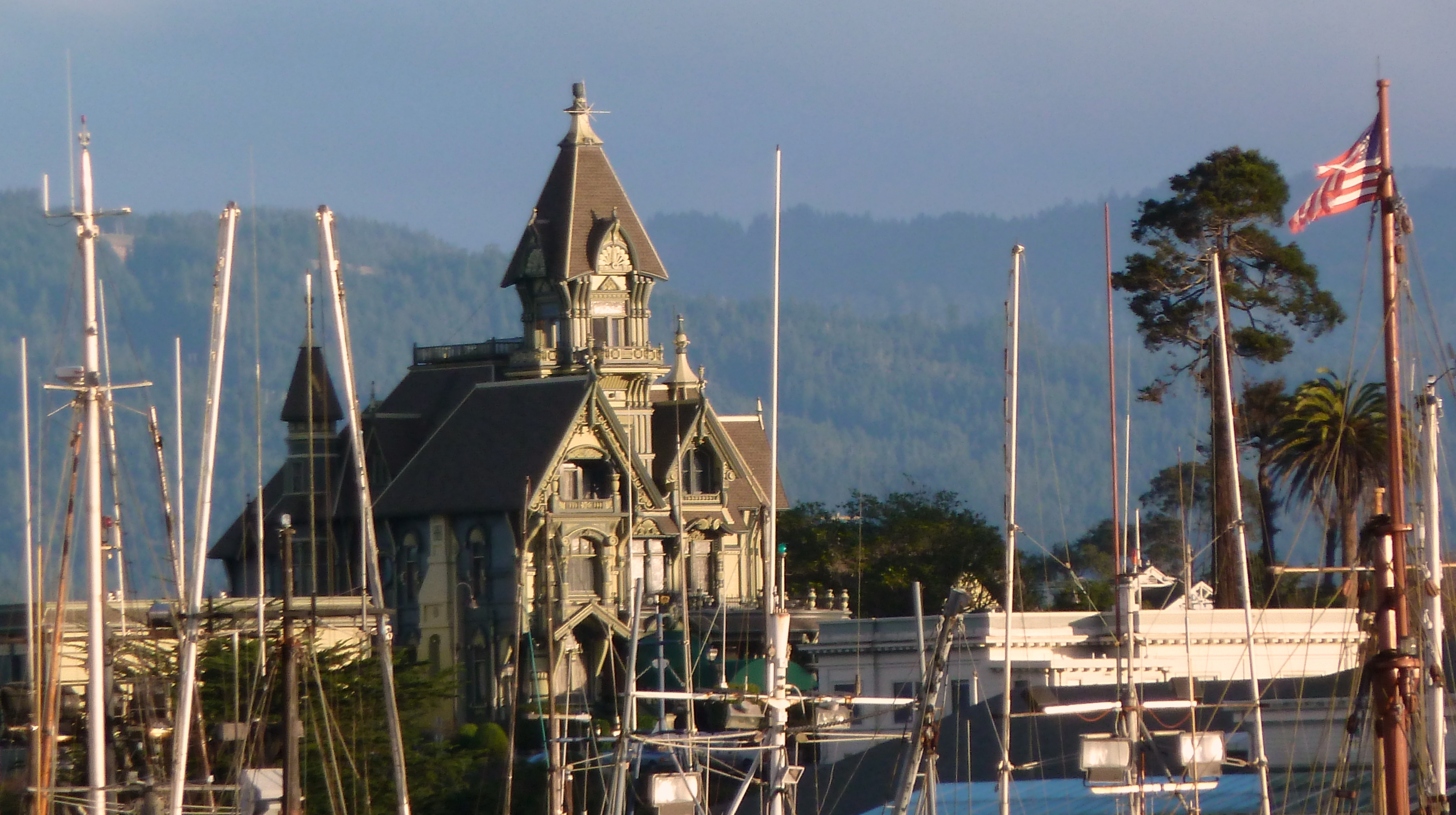
The Carson Mansion as viewed from Humboldt Bay.

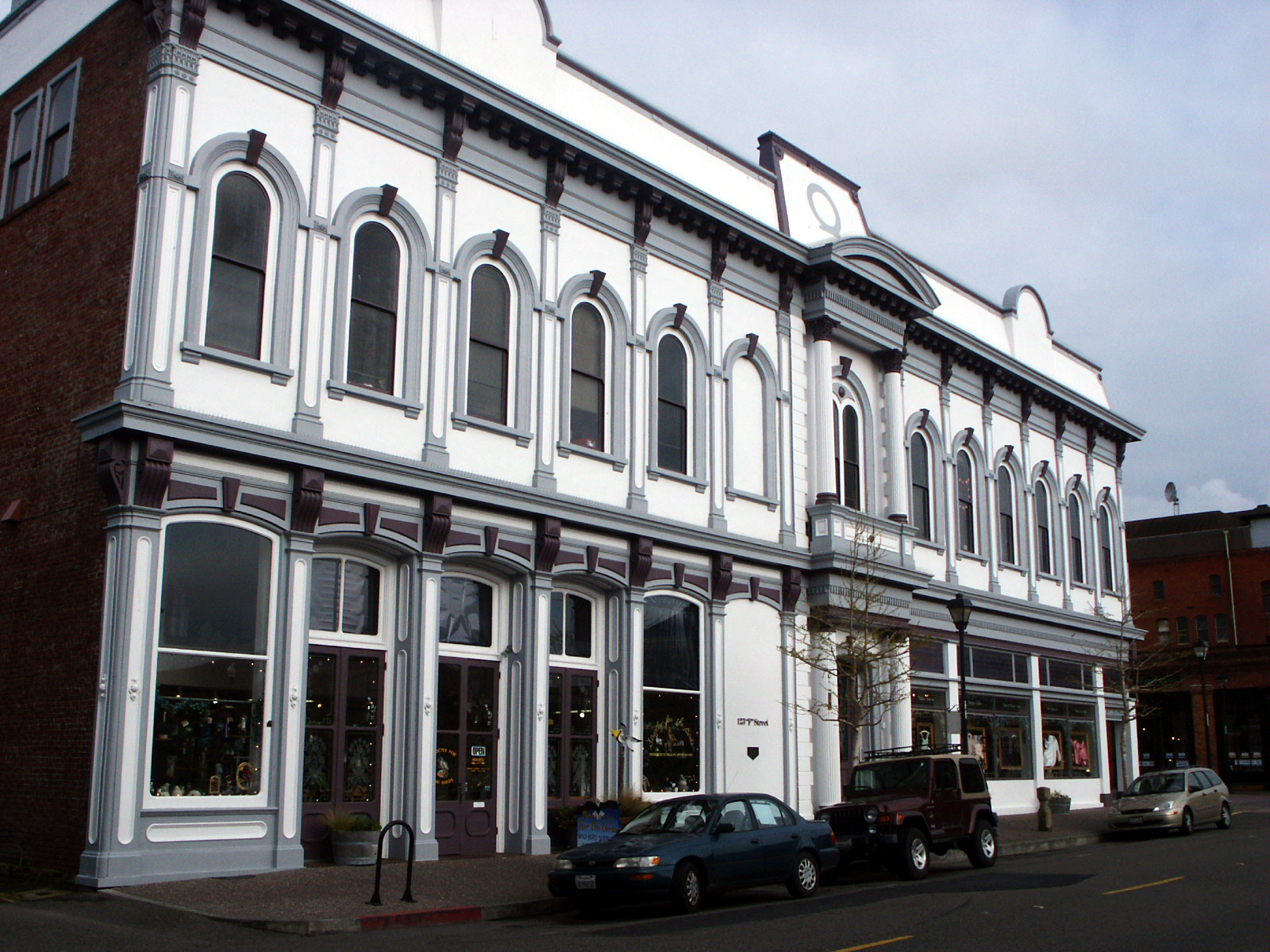
Second Empire Independent Order of Odd Fellows Hall building with original commercial space on the first floor.

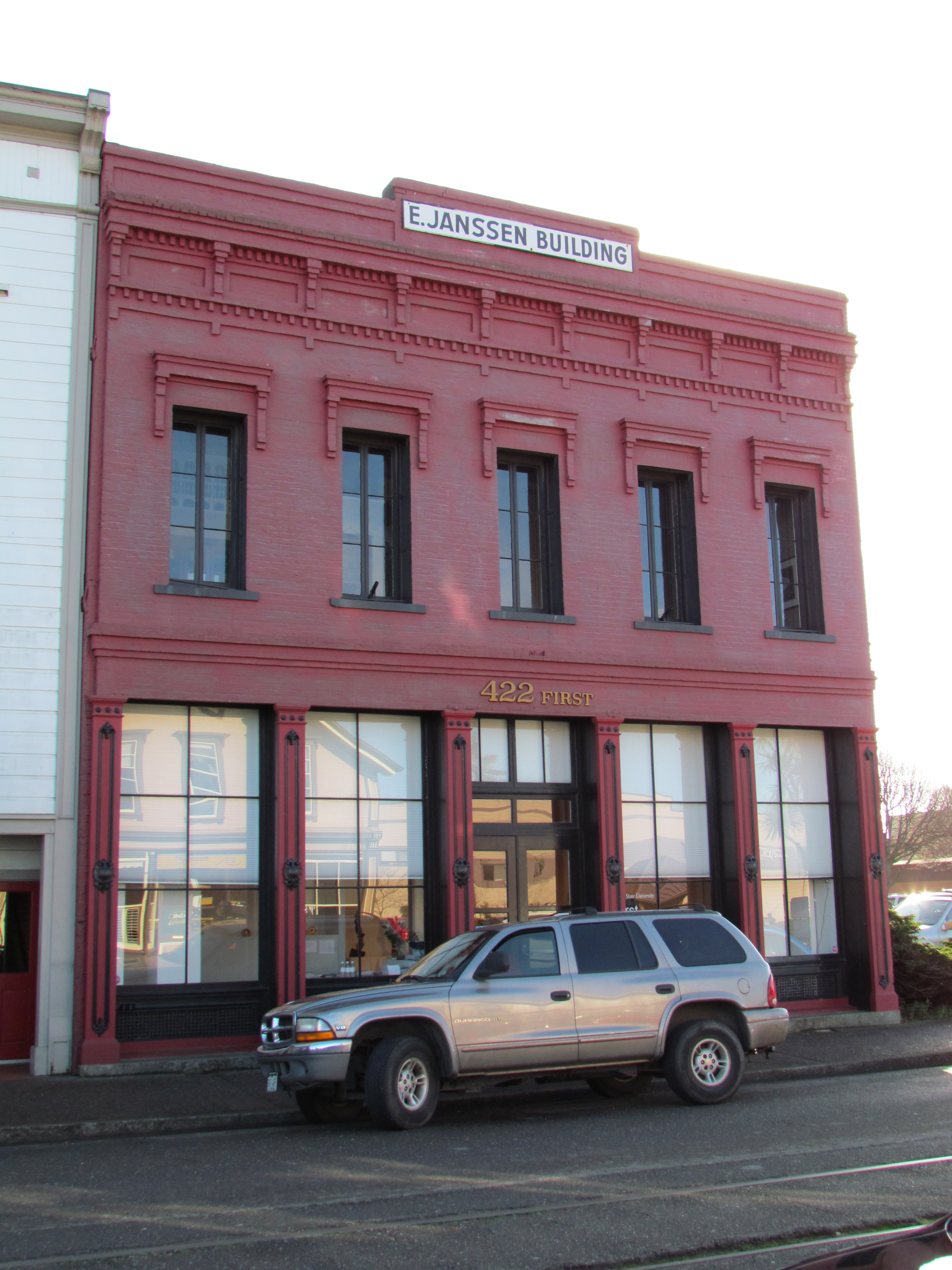
Humboldt Arts Council in mid-1800s (early) commercial brick building.

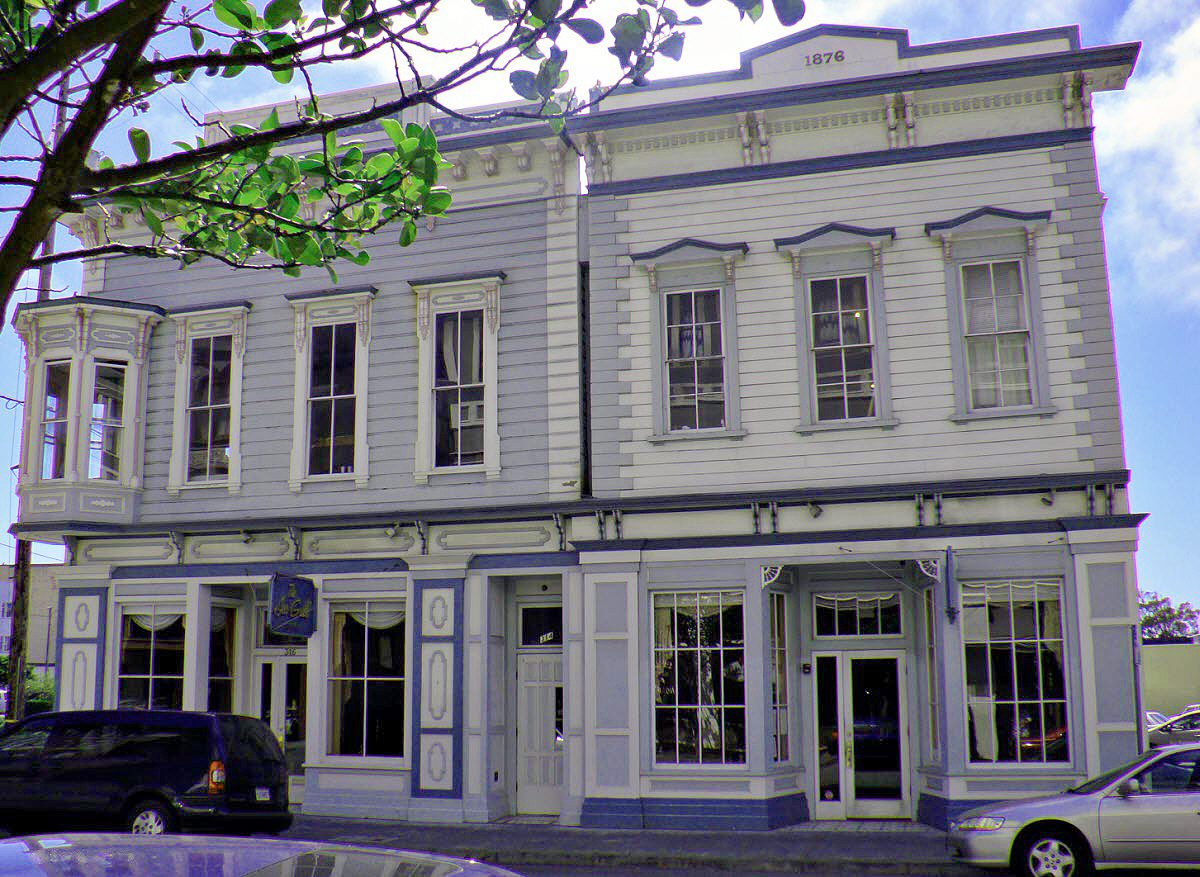
Victorian detailed commercial building now a seafood restaurant

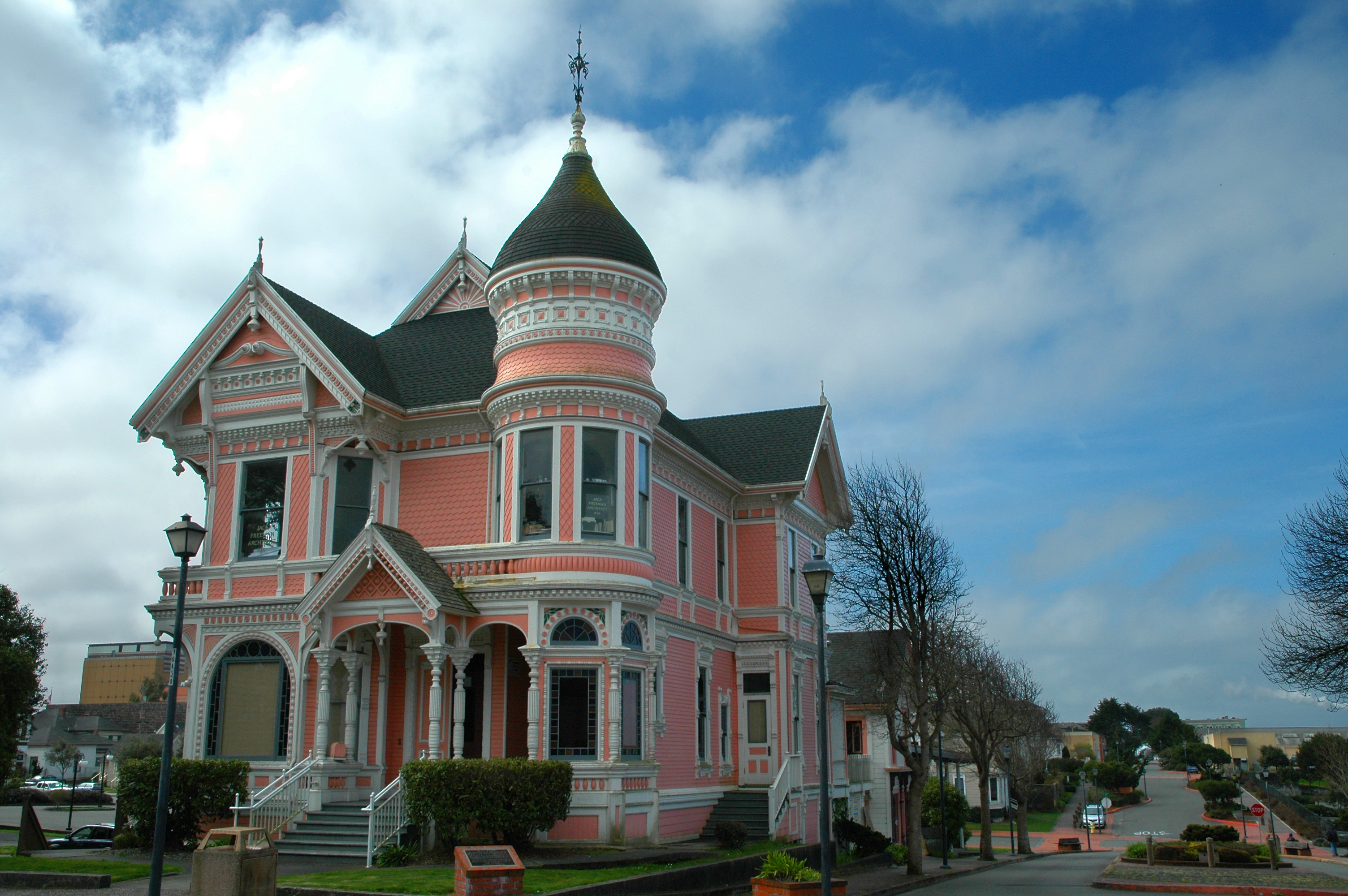
Milton Carson Home: a wedding gift for the son of the early Lumber Baron, William Carson, who built the Carson Mansion, 1889

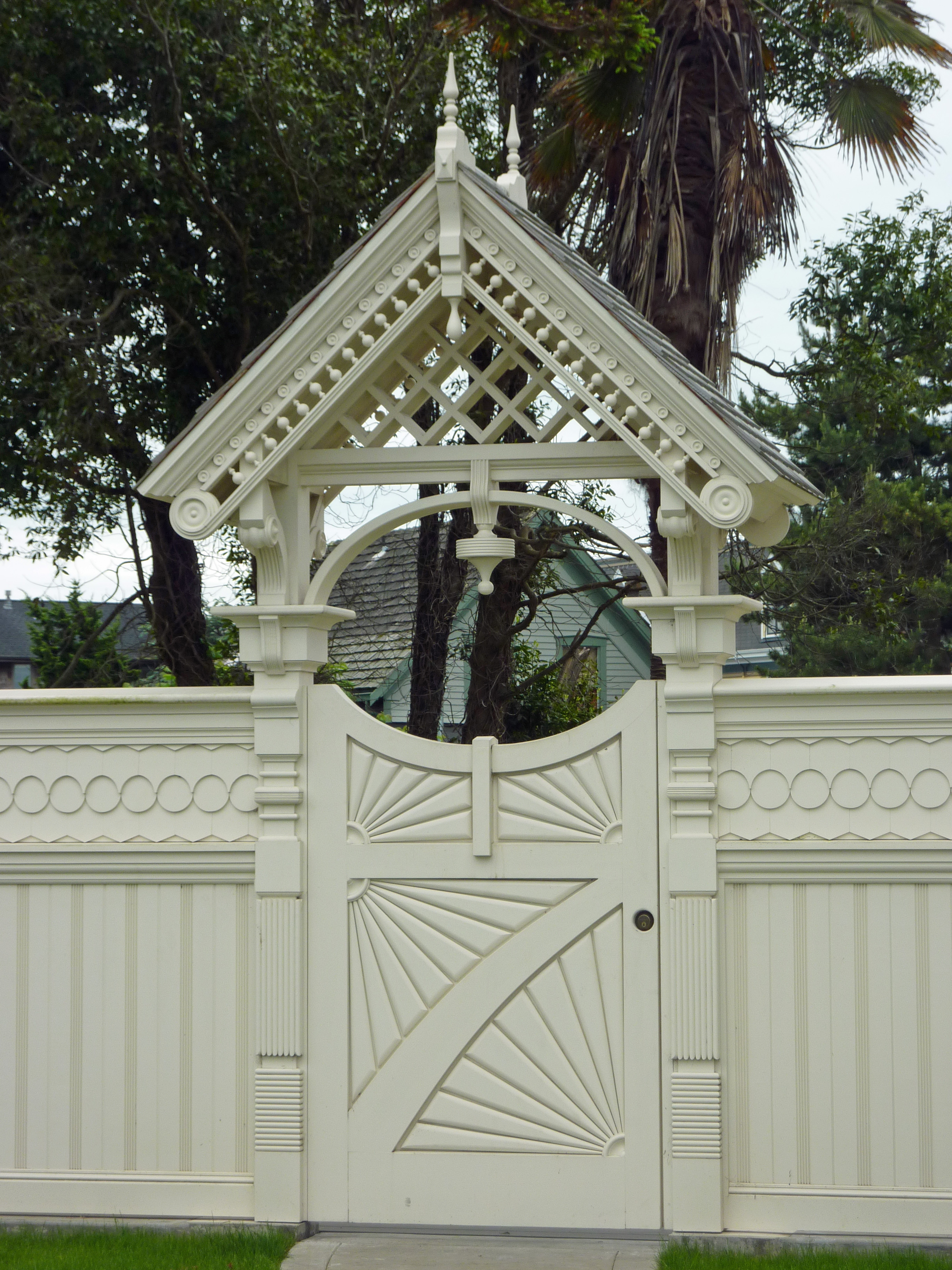
Victorian fencing and gate in the side yard of the Milton Carson Home

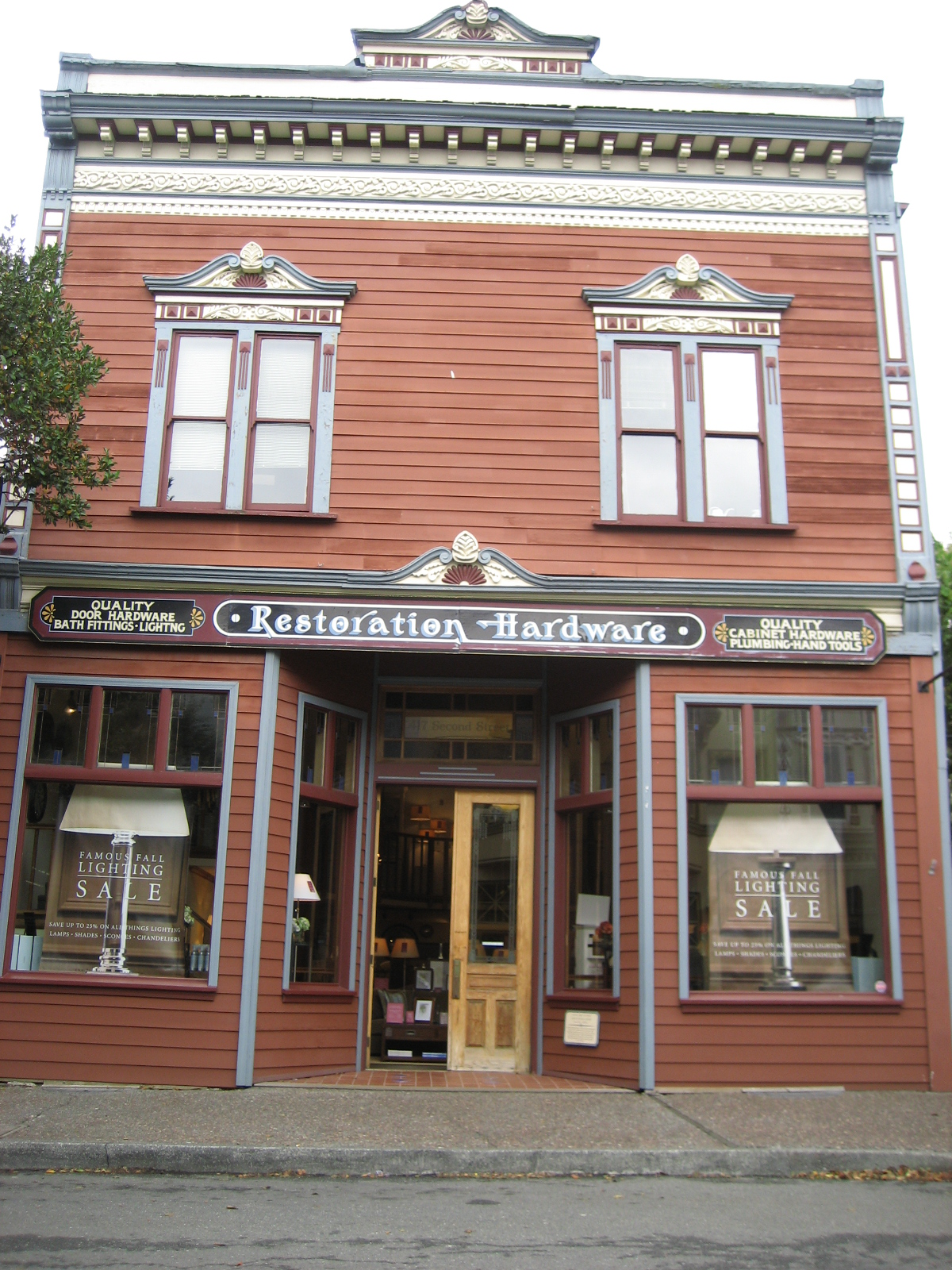
Original Commercial Building with "false" front on 2nd Street

== See also ==
- National Register of Historic Places listings in Humboldt County, California
