= Anderson Marsh State Historic Park =

California state historic park

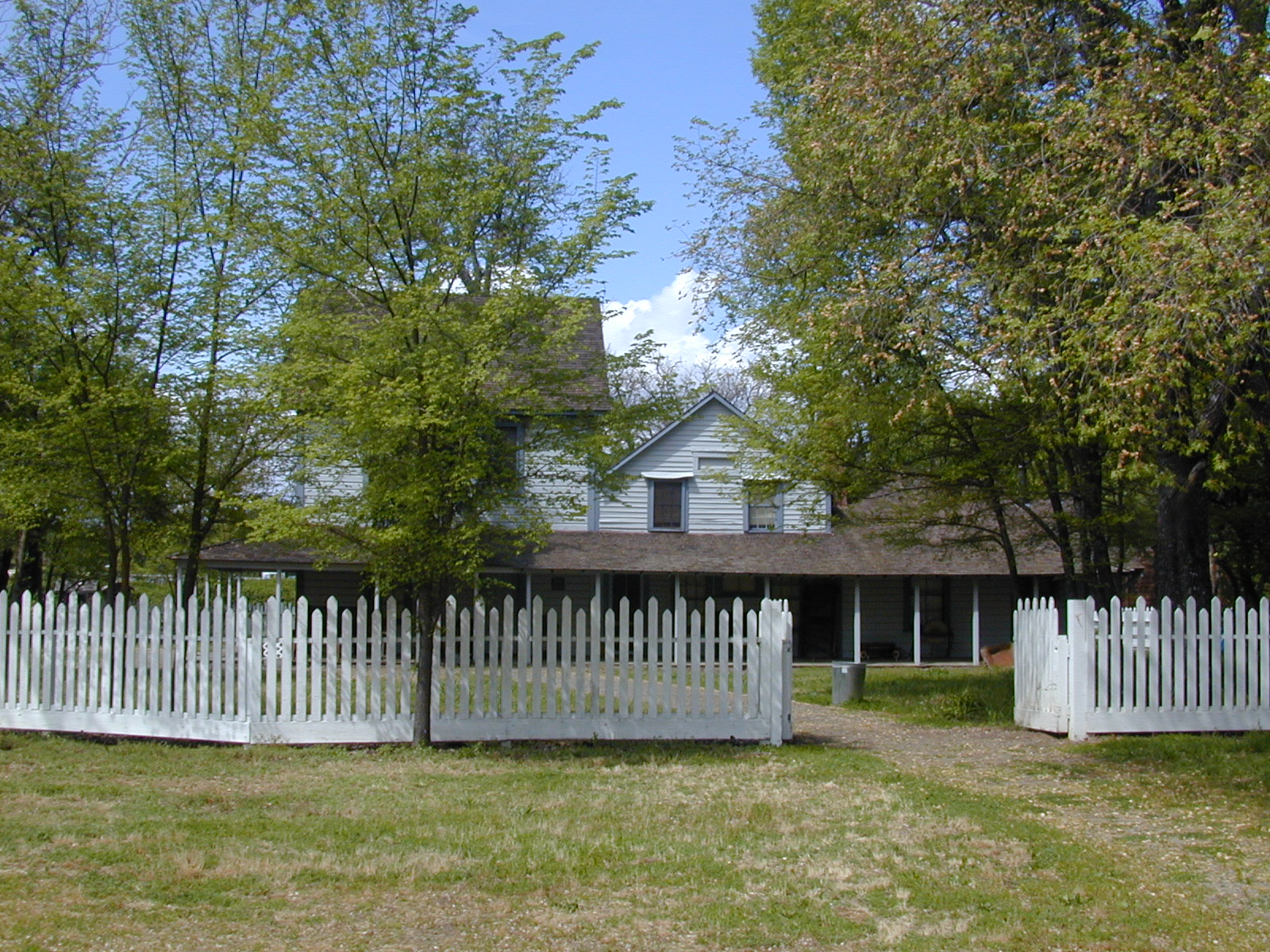
- The Ranch House at Anderson Marsh State Historic Park

- Location within California Location within the United States
- Location: Lake County, California, United States
- Nearest city: Clearlake, California
- Coordinates: 38°55′25″N 122°37′30″W
- Area: 1,298 acres (5.25 km^{2})
- Established: 1982
- Governing body: California Department of Parks and Recreation

Anderson Marsh State Historic Park is a California State Historic Park and nature reserve preserving a tule marsh, archaeological sites of the Pomo people, and historic ranch structures. It is located in Lake County, California, United States. Anderson Marsh is located at the head of Cache Creek on the southeast corner of Clear Lake, the largest natural lake completely within the borders of California. The park is between the cities of Lower Lake and Clearlake on State Route 53, north of Calistoga in the wine country. The park is open year-round.

== Natural history ==
The Anderson Marsh Park contains 1,065 acres (431 ha) of native bunch grass-covered hills, oak woodland, and Tule (Schoenoplectus acutus) marshes. It protects several habitats including: freshwater marsh wetlands, native grasslands, California oak woodlands, and riparian woodlands. Aquatic and terrestrial wildlife include: large mouth bass, bluegill, catfish, crappie, the north-western pond turtle, bats, gray fox, frogs, garter snakes, mink, muskrats, opossums, raccoon, river otter, skunks, and toads.

Approximately 151 different bird species, both migrating and resident, have been identified in the park.

== History ==
The Southeastern Pomo Native Americans, one of the largest groups of indigenous peoples of the Americas in pre-Columbian California, lived in the area of present-day Anderson Marsh State Historic Park, and their descendants continue to do so nearby. Anderson Marsh's archaeological sites provide artifacts of the Pomo people. Some sites are among the oldest found in California, dated at over 10,000 years old. After recording 43 prehistoric sites, John Parker nominated the area to the National Register of Historic Places and began a campaign to have the sites acquired as a new State Park.

John Grigsby homesteaded in 1854 with his family, and built a small house. Scotsman John Still Anderson, with his wife and six children, bought the property from Grigsby in 1884, built what is now known as the Ranch House, and ran a dairy and raised beef cattle. Their descendants lived in the Ranch House until the 1960s.

The State Historic Park was named after John Still Anderson in 1982 after the State of California acquired the Anderson Marsh.

== Visitor attractions ==
=== Activities ===
The park offers bird watching, hiking, a bluegrass musical festival, and interpretive programs, including a historic ranch home.

=== Anderson Marsh Interpretive Association - AMIA ===
The Anderson Marsh Interpretive Association (AMIA) was formed in 1984 by park staff and other volunteers. The primary objective of the association is to promote the education and interpretive activities of the park. AMIA also funds projects including: habitat conservation and restoration work, trail accessibility construction and maintenance, interpretive displays and written information, facilities, historical objects rehabilitation, and acquiring interpretive items.

==== Previous closure proposals ====
Anderson Marsh State Historic Park was one of 48 California state parks scheduled to close in 2008 by California Governor Arnold Schwarzenegger for financial reasons, but the closure was eventually postponed. In July 2012, the park again faced closure as a means to achieve part of the $11 million budget reduction for the 2011/2012 fiscal year, but the passing of Assembly Bill 1478 in September 2012 indefinitely postponed the closure as well as increased the park's future funding.

== See also ==
- Post Pattern - Paleo-Indian archaeological culture
- List of Museums in the North Coast (California)
