= Grace Hudson Museum =

Museum in Ukiah, California, U.S.

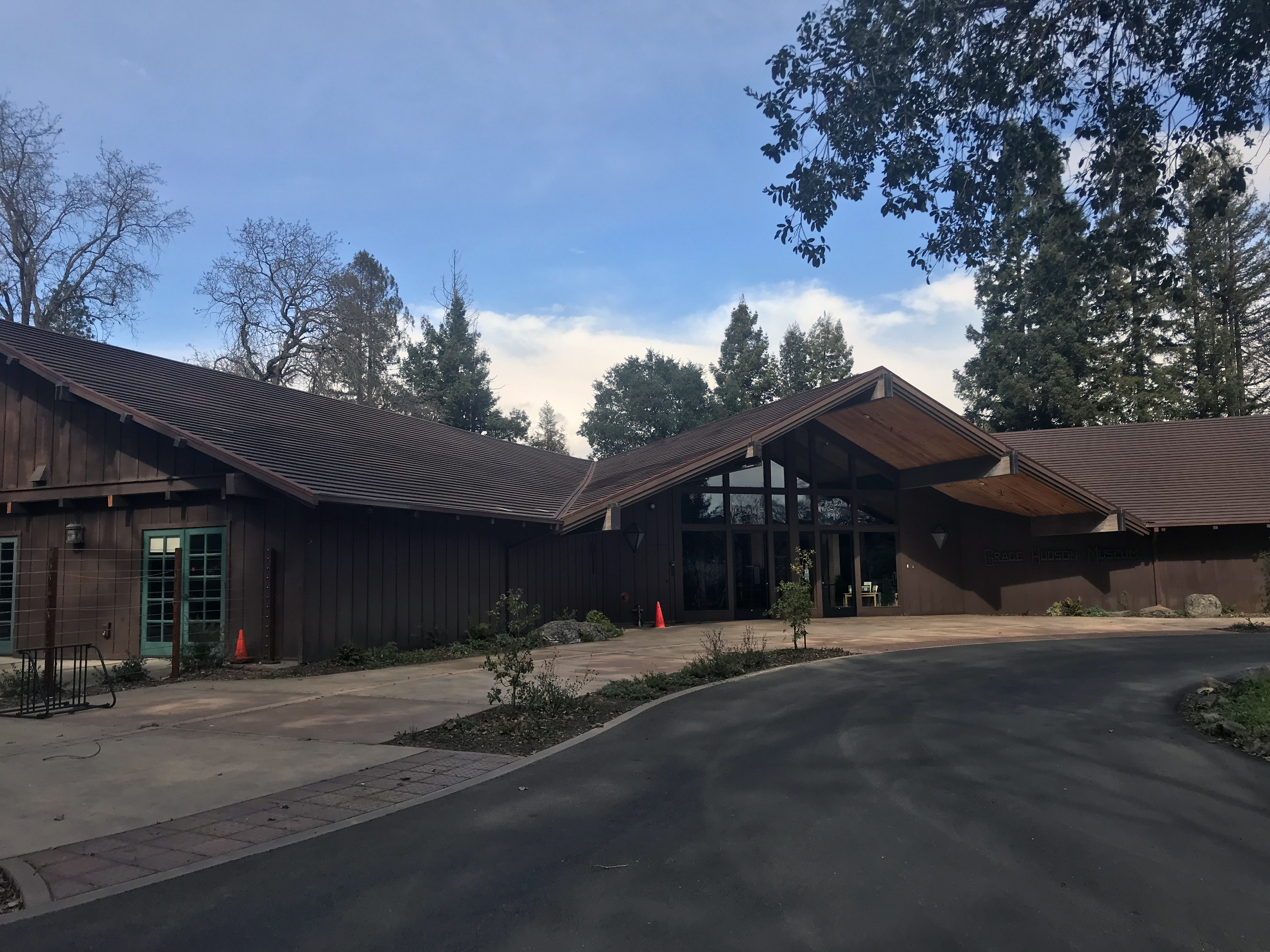
- Established: 1986
- Location: 431 S Main Street; Ukiah, California, U.S.
- Coordinates: 39°08′52″N 123°12′18″W
- Type: Historical society
- Website: www.gracehudsonmuseum.org
- Sun House
- U.S. National Register of Historic Places
- California Historical Landmark
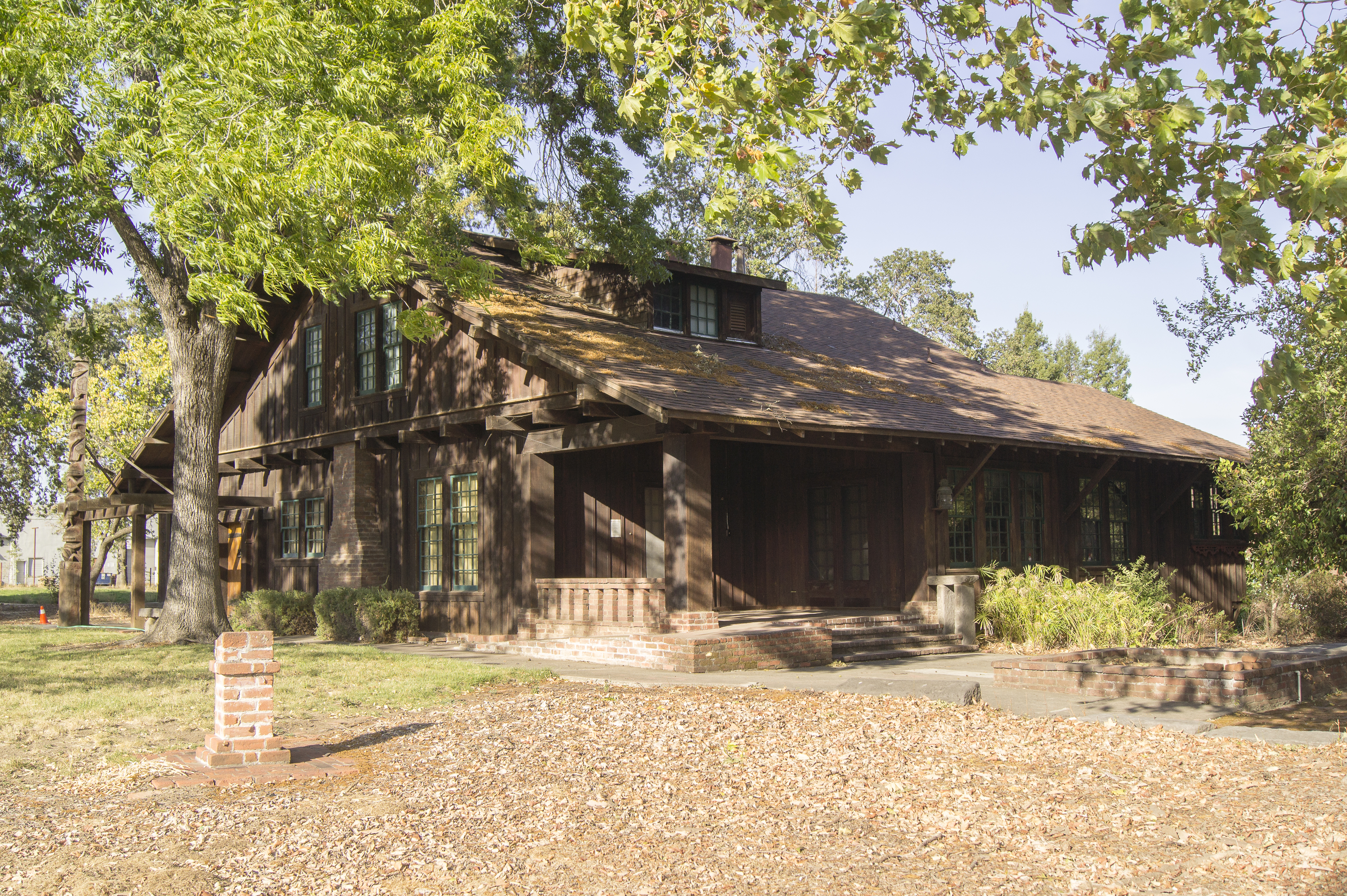

- Location within California
- Location: 431 S. Main St., Ukiah
- Coordinates: 39°08′51″N 123°12′20″W
- Built: 1911
- Architect: George L Wilcox
- Architectural style: Craftsman Bungalow
- NRHP reference No.: 81000161
- CHISL No.: 926
- Added to NRHP: September 2, 1981

The Grace Hudson Museum in Ukiah, California, is adjacent to the Sun House which artist Grace Hudson and her husband John designed and had built in 1911. Today the house and museum are owned and operated by the City of Ukiah. The Sun House, a Craftsman-style house constructed of redwood, is listed on the National Register of Historic Places.

== History ==
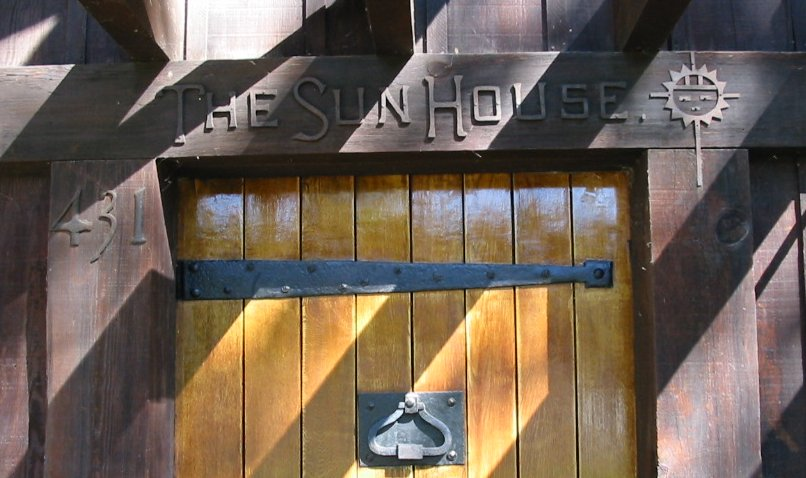
Front door of The Sun House, with Hopi sun symbol

After working in Oklahoma Territory in 1904-1906, Grace and John Hudson returned to Ukiah, California. There they designed and built what became known as The Sun House in 1911. It was a Craftsman-style California bungalow made of redwood. The Hudsons adopted the Hopi sun symbol as their own and displayed the symbol over the front door. They led a modest bohemian lifestyle of collecting, traveling, field work, reading, entertaining, photography and painting. John Hudson died at The Sun House in 1936, and Grace in 1937.

They had no children. Grace Hudson bequeathed The Sun House and its land to her nephew, Mark Carpenter. Carpenter preserved the house and its 30,000 collected objects for posterity, giving it to the City of Ukiah. The house is listed on the National Register of Historic Places and designated California Historical Landmark #926. The Sun House and Museum are operated by the city within its 4-acre (16,000 m^{2}) Hudson-Carpenter park. The museum's website says of Grace Hudson, "...her work enjoys renewed interest and recognition for its fine and sympathetic portrayals of native peoples."

== Gallery ==
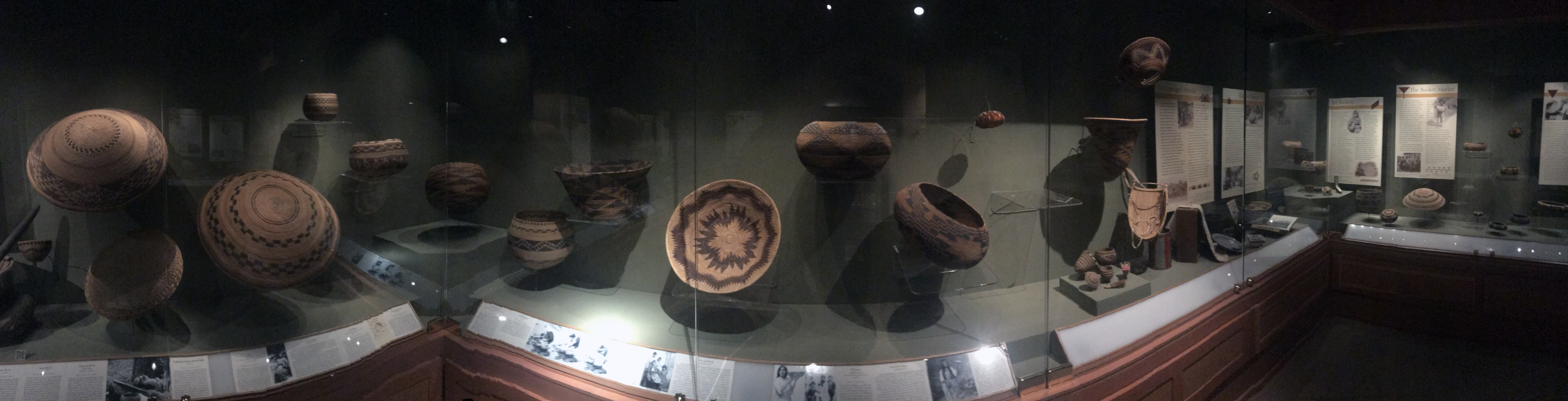
Pomo baskets on exhibit

== See also ==
- List of single-artist museums
- List of Museums in the North Coast (California)
