= Fern Cottage (California) =

Pioneer ranch in northern California

- Fern Cottage Historic District
- U.S. National Register of Historic Places
- U.S. Historic district
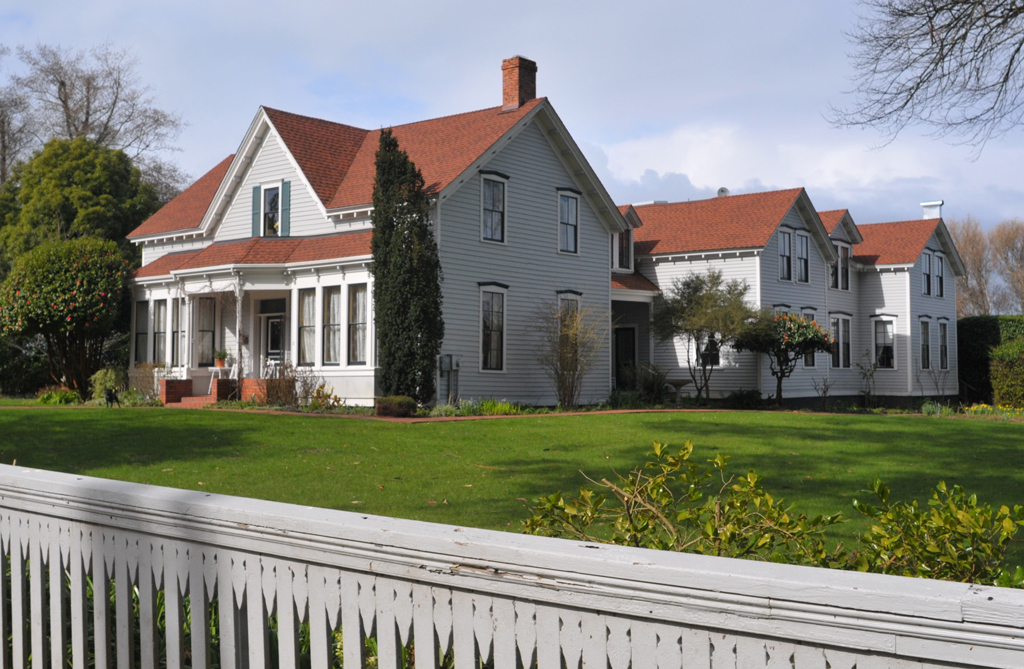
- Fern Cottage, part of Fern Cottage Historic District, near Ferndale, California on a 160-acre historic district of 16 buildings and 2 structures, home of the Russ pioneer family.

- Location within California Location within the United States
- Location: 2121 Centerville Road, Ferndale, California
- Nearest city: Ferndale, California
- Area: 160 acres (65 ha)
- Built: 1866 with additions in 1878, 1892 and 1897
- Built by: John Fairchild
- Architect: George Fairfield
- Architectural style: Gothic Revival, Carpenter Gothic
- Website: https://www.ferncottage.org
- NRHP reference No.: 87002294
- Added to NRHP: January 7, 1988

The 160-acre Fern Cottage Historic District includes ranch land and 18 buildings. Added to the National Register of Historic Places in 1988, "The focal point of the District is Fern Cottage, a settlement-period farmhouse whose architectural and historical integrity are without compromise." Fern Cottage is the fourth and final home of pioneers Zipporah (1838–1929) and Joseph Russ (1825–1886) and their 13 children. Originally called Willow Creek (and Willow Farm), the cottage was built in 1866, with additions in the late 1800s and 1920. Family members lived in it for over a century.

The house museum contains artwork, business ledgers, maps, photographs and is one of the few National Register homes in California containing the original furniture and furnishings.

It is located about three miles west of Ferndale, California, at 2121 Centerville Road.

== Economic Base ==
Joseph Russ and his wife Zipporah Russ owned about 50,000 acres of land in the area with beef cattle and 2000 dairy cattle. They were in the "forwarding and commission business and are one of the large dealers in butter on the coast" with three ships. With partners Searls and Putnam they also operated the largest store in the county in addition to saw mills and a slaughter house in 1864. These businesses funded the construction and operation of Fern Cottage which operated as the headquarters of the business along with being a stopping-over point for cattle drives to and from the other more remote ranches.

== Design and building ==
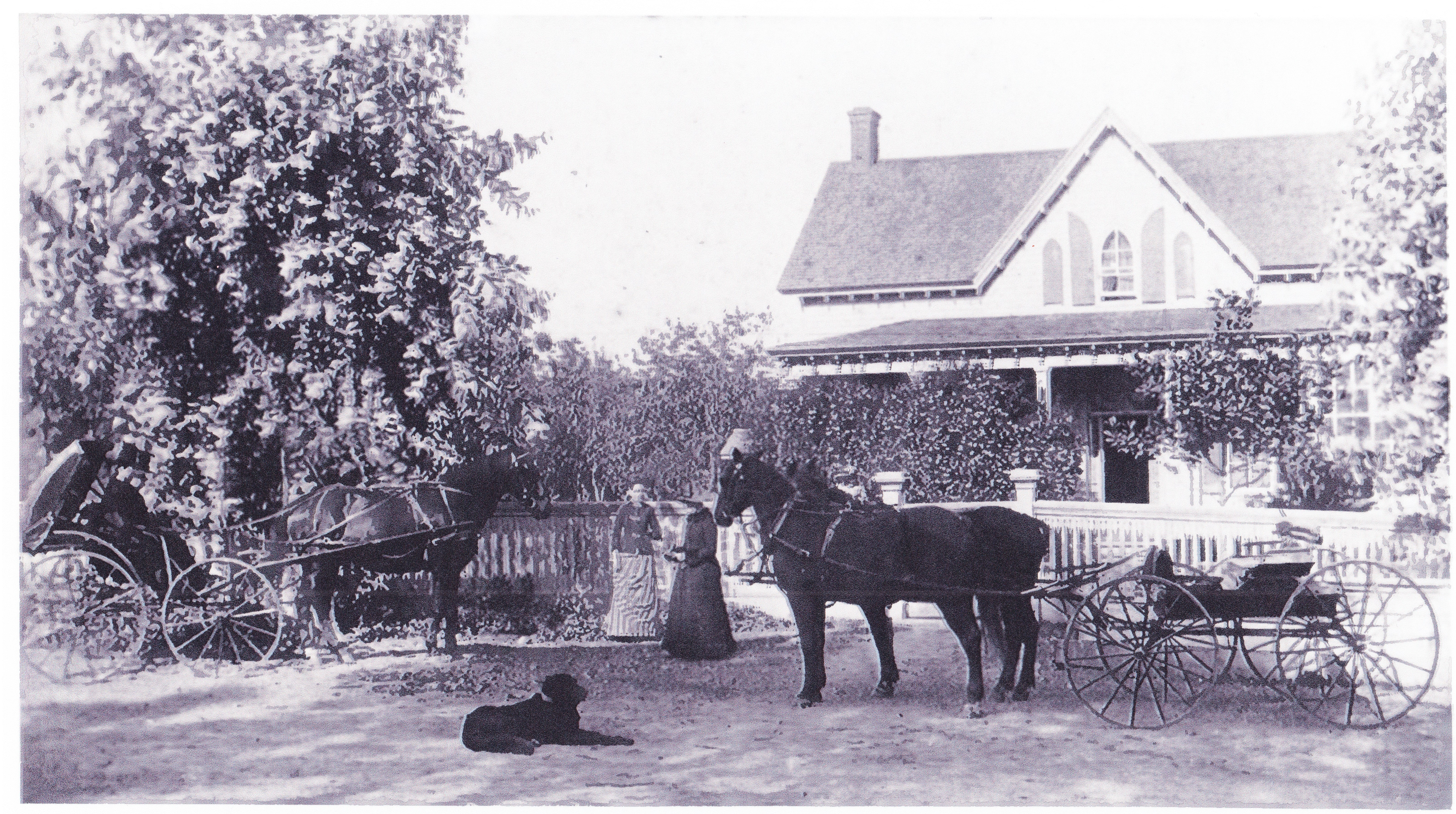
Fern Cottage with original gothic revival lancet window and porch. (c. 1866–1884)

The 31-room home is now on a 160 acres (65 ha) historic district, that was once part of a vast 50,000+ acre land holding (now mostly owned by descendants of the Russ'). The portion of the land holding that was the Fern Cottage ranch was 640 acres purchased from three previous owners between 1865 and 1866. Architect/Builder George Fairfield designed Fern Cottage for the family. The 1866 original construction of the 8 room house was by John Fairchild (from Kentucky). The family moved into the house shortly before Christmas, 1866.

Fern Cottage is a settlement-period farmhouse whose architectural and historical integrity are without compromise. A 1 1/2-story, center-gable house with end gables, Fern Cottage has several major additions that continue the gabled architecture of the original house. The original design and construction was modestly more carpenter gothic than the existing structure. The house retains its gothic window hood mouldings.

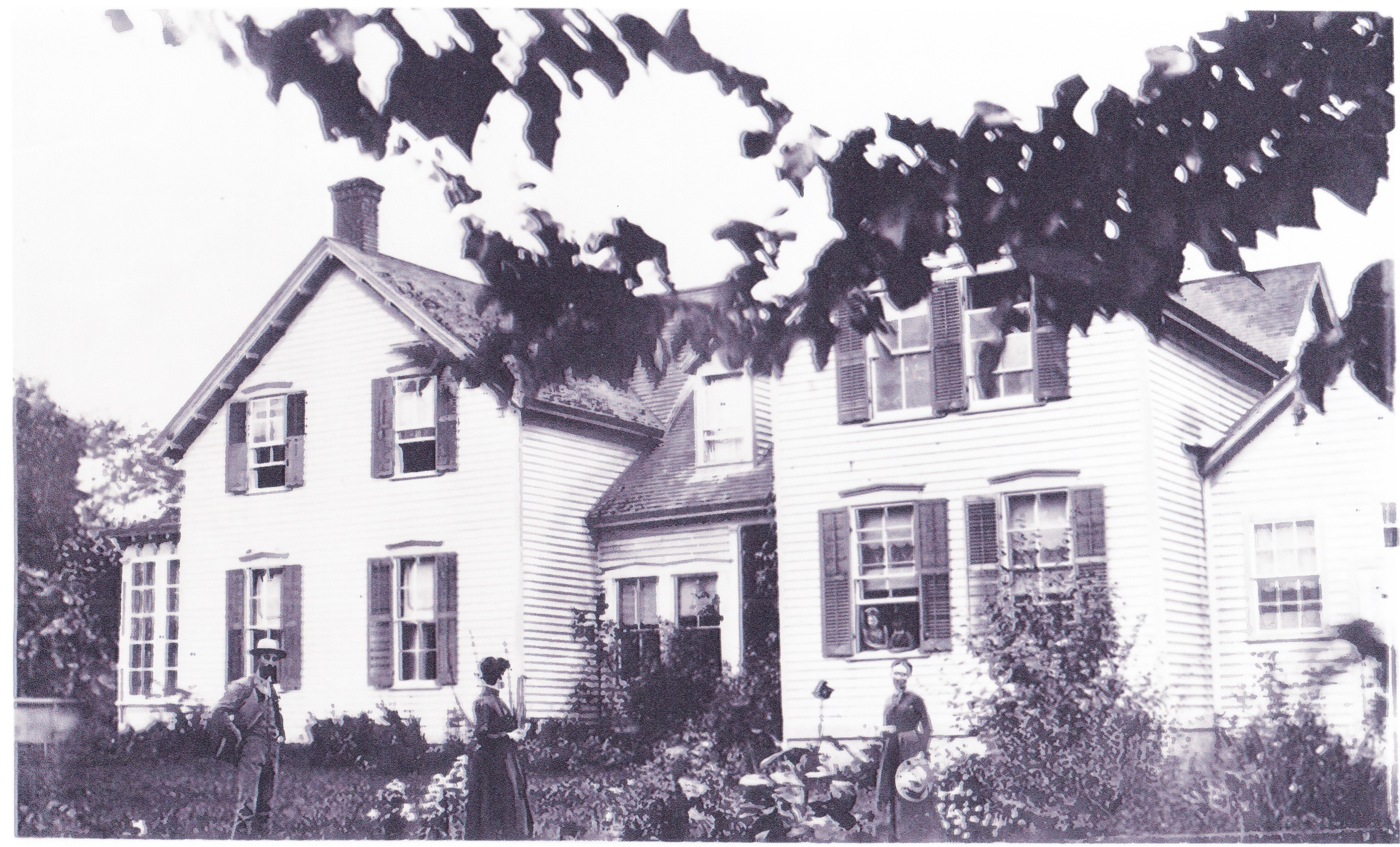
Fern Cottage with the 1878 addition to the 1866 original cottage and the one-story 1892 addition.

The first addition on the east side was made in 1878 as noted in the Ferndale Enterprise: "Mr. Joseph Russ has subjoined a large fine two-story addition to his residence". An 1882 lithograph which appeared in Elliott's History of Humboldt County California shows this addition with a shed-style attachment at the rear, possibly a woodshed.

The rear shed was removed for construction of a one-story addition in 1892 as reported in the Ferndale Enterprise: "The carpenter work at Fern Cottage has been finished and the Cottage looms up fine." In September, the work of painting Fern Cottage was completed.

The third addition, which includes the upper story of the second addition plus the third gabled section, appears to have been built in 1897 to accommodate a growing family of adult children and spouses, grandchildren, and guests, who spent extended periods at the cottage. Letters from Russ daughters who were studying in Europe in 1897–1898 make reference to the construction of the "Grandchildren's Wing," believed to be this final addition. The present five-window square bays flanking the central porch and entrance were constructed in 1884. The porch posts date to the 1884 remodeling replacing earlier gothic revival split posts.

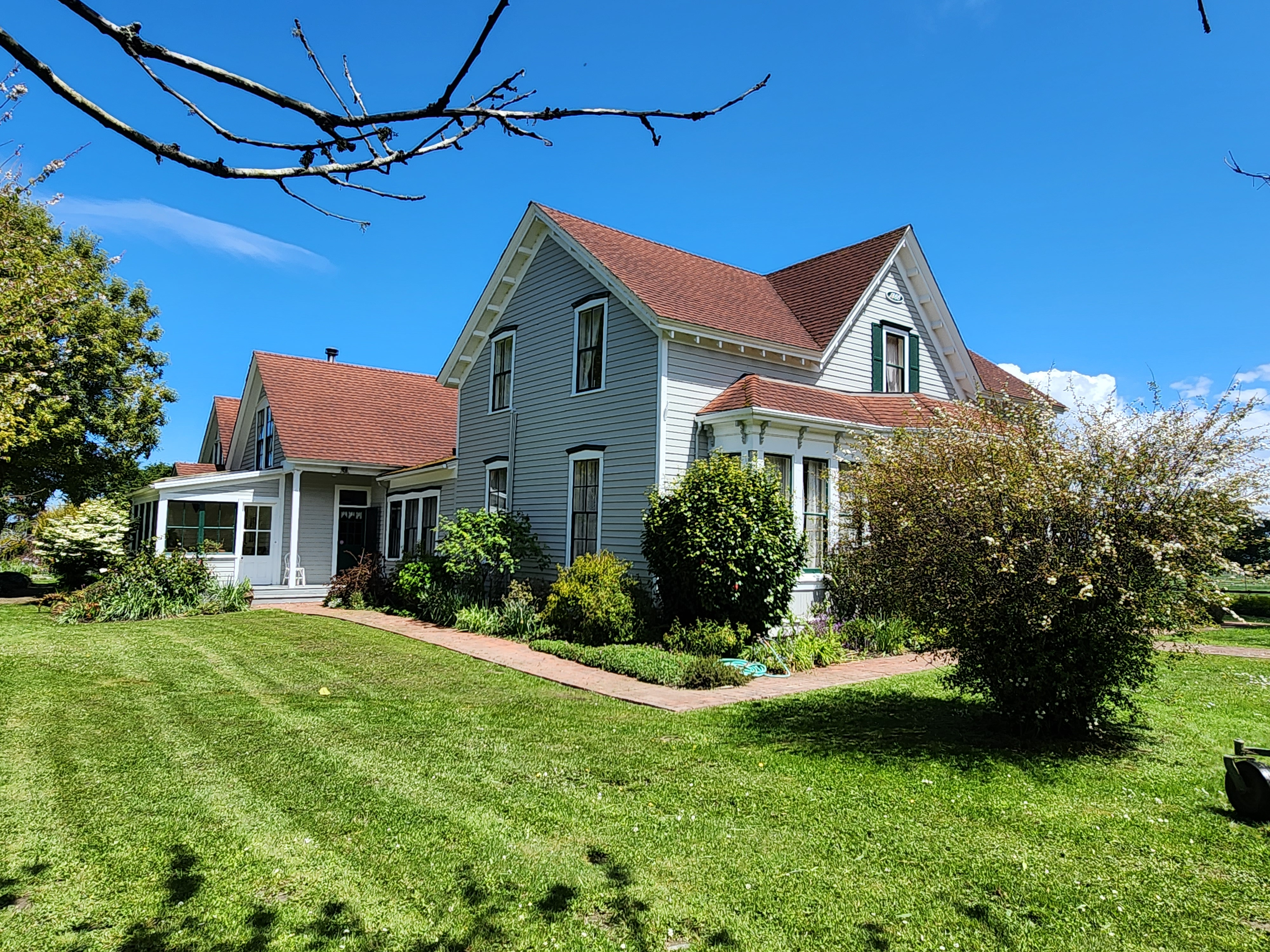
Fern Cottage, west and south (front) sides in 2023

The existing front brick work dates to about 1914. Construction of the shed dormer which fits between these two gabled dormers occurred circa 1920.

Except for the original front section of the house, the west side presents a different appearance than that of the additions on the east side. At the northern end of the west side, there is a small, gabled section which contains the kitchen with the cook's room above. A sun porch was added to the west wall of the kitchen about 1920.

== Preservation ==
The cottage and the surrounding four acres which include many of the outbuildings, are maintained by the non-profit Fern Cottage Foundation. The extensive archives are open for research purposes while the house museum and gardens are open for guided tours (by appointment) and events.

== Decoration, furnishings, technological changes ==
It "today contains a collection of Victorian era furnishings and artifacts alongside slightly more modern Arts and Craft pieces. Most of the furniture and furnishings in Fern Cottage are original, so visitors will see it much as it was between the 1870s and 1970s when the family lived there."

The interior of Fern Cottage is mostly intact, and despite efforts by the daughters to keep the family in the mainstream of interior decoration and furnishings, time seems to have stopped for some rooms in the 19th century and for others, in the 1920s. The fireplace in the east living room was modernized into the Craftsman style in the 1920s, but the vertical-board wainscoting remains as does Mrs. Russ' chair in its accustomed place beside the fireplace. The parlor on the west side was created from a billiard room which had originally been the two downstairs bedrooms. It is a more formal room than the living room and includes marble-topped tables, stuffed chairs and sofa, and a square pianoforte.

The kitchen retains a wood-burning stove that heats the room and cooks food as it has for more than a century. The original kitchen was in the one-story rear extension, but was moved to the present location in the early 1870s. The wood-burning stove, a French Range No. 2, from George H. Tay, & Company, San Francisco, California, has not been modernized. There are no cabinets since the adjoining pantry provides work space, storage and the (natural) refrigerator; the original wood box stands against an interior wall; and a wooden drainboard surrounds the single sink. Running water was added to the cottage c. 1910.

Eating arrangements changed in 1880 with construction of the dining room for the family and the Sanctum (a separate men's boarding house) for the hired help. The present dining room has a china closet where Mrs. Russ' dishes are still stored; burlap panels on the walls almost to the tops of the door with wallpaper above, and a pass closet connected to the kitchen. The white oak dining table and chairs were purchased in 1880 or 1881.

Above the dining room is a small, gabled dormer with a pair of casement windows. This is a sunny 1920 bathroom.

Other interior, lower-floor changes include the back hall sitting area where the original kitchen was located and which was used as a dining area before construction of the dining room in 1880, and Mr. Russ' office, created out of a corner of the kitchen and the east-side verandah. The 1892 construction added a new stairway, rear hall, laundry room, pantry to the rear of the kitchen, storeroom (ironing room) and a room to the rear of the 1878 master bedroom.

The third addition included the men's room (now known as the quilt room) at the northeast corner of the house. It has a wood mantel piece decorated with wild game carvings. In this room and the adjoining room in the second addition, the family's papers, correspondence, photographs, books and personal things are now stored. Hundreds of pieces of correspondence dating to the 1840s and including both personal and business items, are filed by years and identified by correspondents. This archival material is a record of the Russ family; more importantly, it is a chronicle of Humboldt County settlement and life and the emergence of not only this family, but the region into the 20th century.

In the upstairs, the four bedrooms of the main house are pleasant, simply furnished rooms with original furniture. Zipporah and Joseph Russ had their first child in 1855 and their 13th in 1879. Married daughters returned with their large families for extended periods to live at Fern Cottage. Some married children lived at the Cottage and guests were a normal part of the household routine.

There are three small bedrooms and a bath in the attic of the extension. Added upstairs spaces include: the trunk room of the 1878 addition, plus a cook's room over the kitchen; a back stairway built as part of the 1892 addition; a bedroom with bath across the hall, dressing room and nurse's room (finished about 1920 for Mrs. Russ' attendant during her later years), and two more bedrooms, all part of the last addition in 1897.

What is now the trunk room, was built as a school room and, "...used by a teacher brought to the Cottage by Joseph Russ. ...Later the room was used by the women and the seamstress who came from the Bay area each year to do the sewing for the family. Today (1987), it holds the family's travel trunks, containing clothing and personal items belonging to the various members of the family." In the late 1860s, "...a school house was built in the orchard next to the house for the education of the children and some neighbors' children". It was later "...moved into the valley to shelter a gun club".

The northwest corner of the house represents several different periods to accommodate the changing needs of the family. On the west wall of the rear section where Mrs. Russ' final bedroom was located is a four-window bay, supported by large wall brackets. A gabled, one-story addition with a porch houses the laundry room and storage shelves where the canning was put away yearly. The laundry room is particularly notable as it contains the stationary laundry tubs with their hand-cranked wringers and the brick fireplace with copper tub where clothes were boiled (a wash copper).

On May 11, 1888, amid an outbreak of measles, the Ferndale Enterprise reported, "Ira Russ will commence the construction of a telephone line from Mazeppa ranch owned by the Russ' to Singley's station to connect at that point with the wire to Eureka. Way offices will be established at Fern Cottage and the Brick Store" in Ferndale, owned by the Russ'. The work was completed by December 7, 1888.

In 1898, the cottage was illuminated by Acetylene gas and was later electrified in the early 20th century.

In 1910, a 40,000 gallon cement reservoir was built to furnish water for Fern Cottage on a hill nearby.

== Later use of the cottage by the family ==
For a time, the cottage was used as a summer residence. For example, after the death of Joseph Russ, the family spent some winters in Eureka.

After the death of Joseph Russ, his wife Zipporah continued the family business as Z. Russ & Sons. Beef cattle continued to be integral to the business with 240 head of cattle shipped on the ship Pomona as reported by the Ferndale Enterprise on October 19, 1897.

It was last lived in by a family member in 1972 before becoming a non-profit house museum and events venue.

== Outbuildings ==
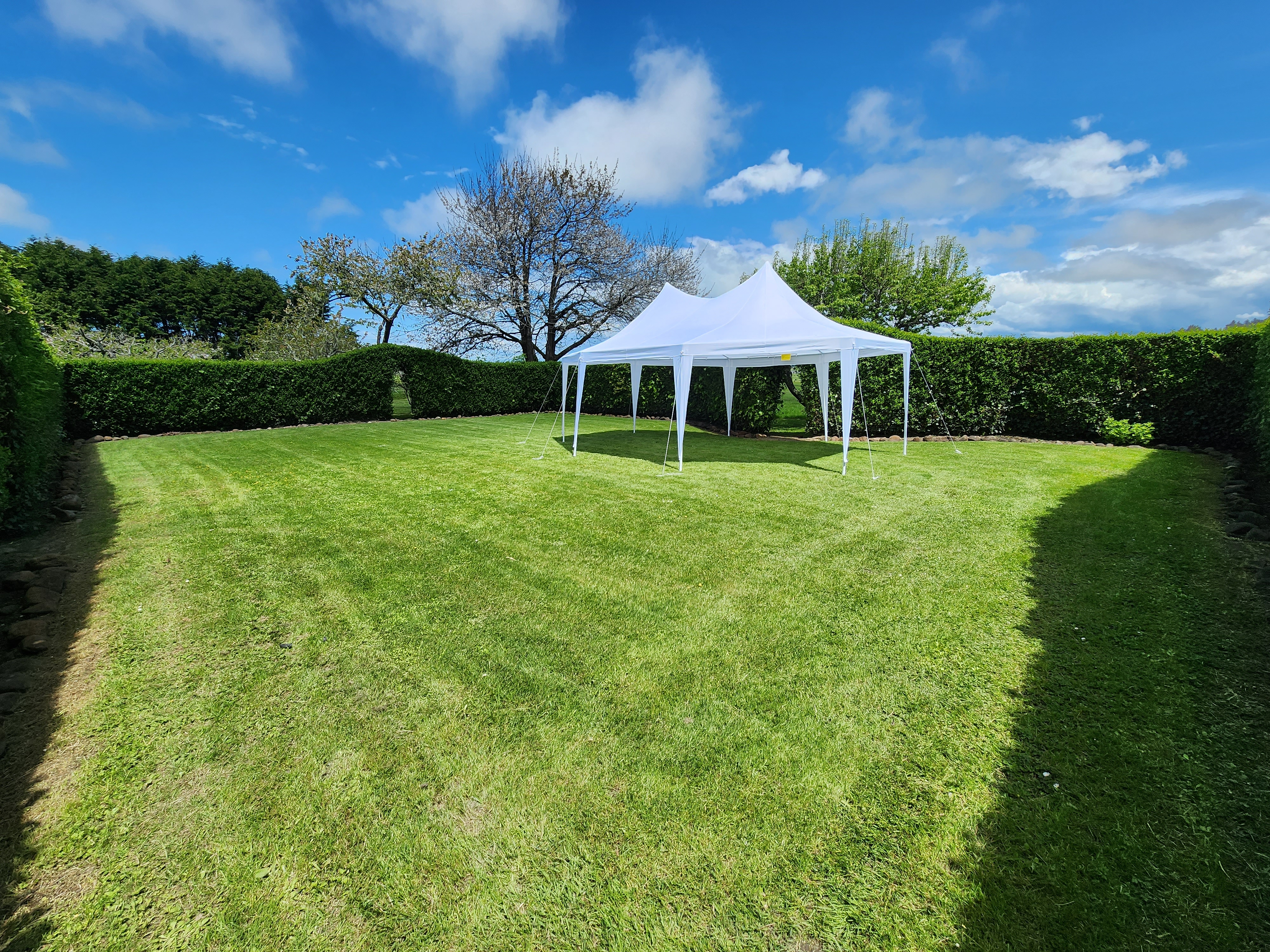
Secret garden, 2023

The National Register of Historic Places records that, "Essential to the historic value of the district are the structures and sites associated with the farmstead—sheds, barns, gardens, orchards—the necessities of a self-sustaining agrarian life. The bottomlands supported livestock and produced feed; the gardens, orchards, and chicken house filled the larder; and the forested hillsides provided fuel and food."

As documented by the National Register of Historic Places, "Surrounding Fern Cottage is a [four-acre] yard, fenced off from the orchards and agricultural lands, and bordered by several tree species including elms brought to Humboldt County by Joseph Russ after a visit to his native Maine in 1876." These trees served as the progenitors of others in the area, "Elm trees in Arcata in the vicinity of the Arcata Elementary School are off-shoots of the original elms planted at Fern Cottage". "In addition, there are flower beds against the house, a rose garden, a large vegetable garden area, and the orchards." Structures associated with the house include a footbridge across Russ Creek and a second wooden footbridge across Russ Creek, along with an animal loading chute and dog kennels. Additional structures are described below.

Its historic district retains 15 wooden outbuildings. Structures and sites contributing to the character of the historic district as described in the National Register of Historic Places Inventory are:

1. Woodshed. Behind Fern Cottage, this structure has a shed roof and two, angled openings on the south where wood is stored. On the north side of this building is a covered area with shelves and ventilated boxes for storage of apples.

2. Clothes reel and platform. Behind the house, this structure was used to air-dry clothes that were washed in tubs and wrung out with hand-cranked wringers. They are found throughout Humboldt County at turn-of-the-century and earlier houses.

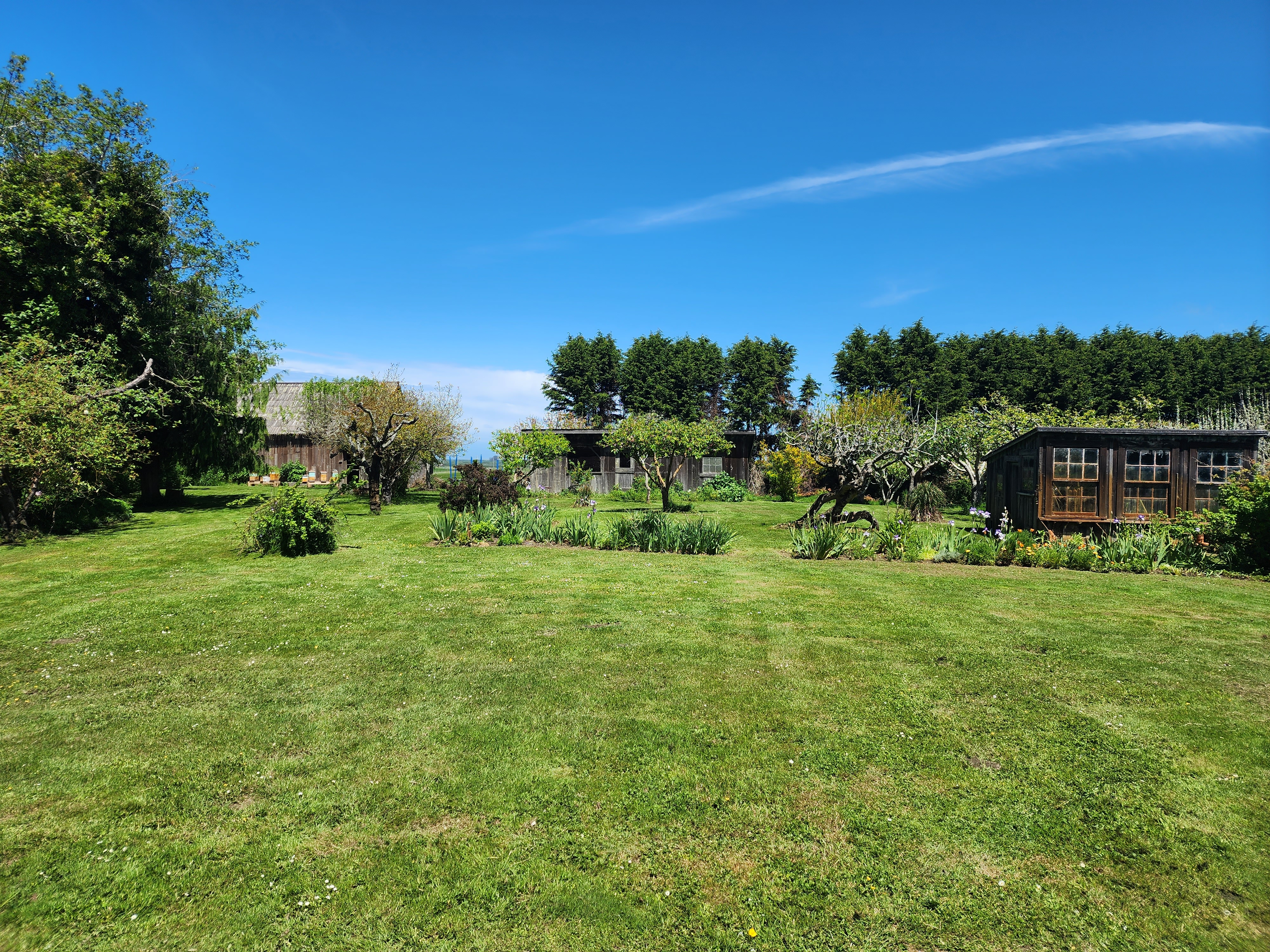
Fern Cottage northwest garden with barn (back left) and goose house (at right)

3. Goose house. This building, used for housing geese for their down used in feather beds and pillows, has large, multi-paned windows on the south, wire cages below the windows, a shed roof and board-and-batten siding.

4. Chicken house (1914). Northeast of the goose house, this building may be a portion of a larger, two-story structure. It has wide, vertical board siding, slanting shed roof, horizontal boards on the ends, multi-paned windows, and open areas covered with chicken wire.

5. Barn. Outside the cottage yard and to the west of the orchard is the household's milk barn, later used as a bull barn. It has a steep gable roof which extends on the north to cover a side shed. The barn is covered with wide, vertical boards and has a corrugated metal roof on the north. Square nails indicate a construction date in the 1870s. Alternatively, this may be the barn reported in the Ferndale Enterprise having been built in 1887 that had a cattle scale nearby. A smokehouse stands near this barn.

As documented in the Ferndale Enterprise, October 1889, "Will Russ and others drove down 120 head of cattle from Redwood [ranch] to be fattened at Fern Cottage where large quantity of hay raised this season." By March, the Ferndale Enterprise reported, "Ira Russ drove a band of beef cattle to Eureka. He has been feeding them at Fern Cottage."

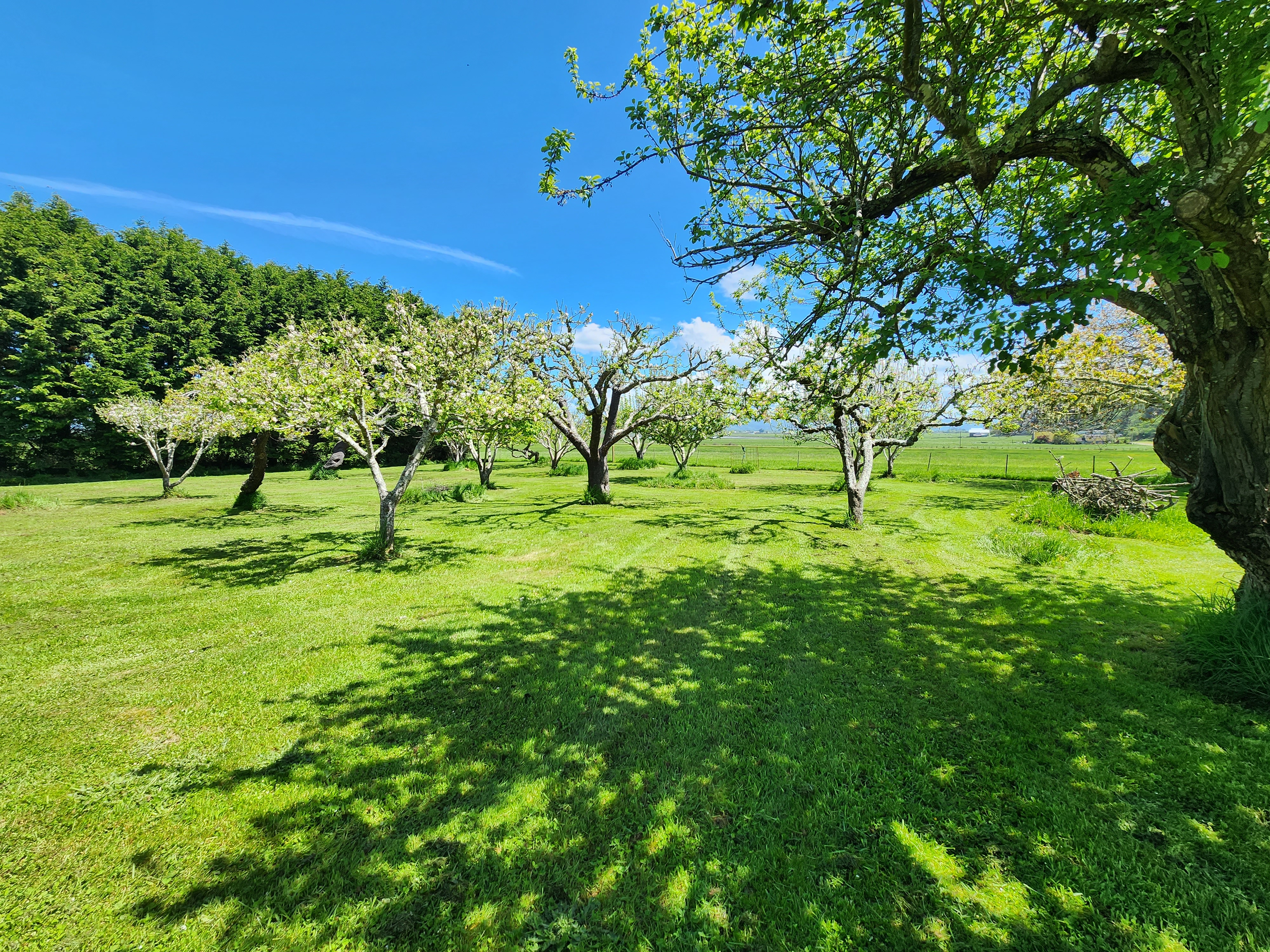
Portion of Fern Cottage orchard, 2023

6. Orchard. Located within a fenced area north of the cottage yard, the orchard is the remaining one of two—a cherry and an apple orchard. These trees provided fruit to the household for both eating and canning. Sheep and bees share this apple orchard today (1987).

7. Fence. Extending across the front of the yard along Centerville Road is an ornate wooden fence consisting of solid top and bottom pieces connected by slats interspersed with arrow-head shaped decoratives extending from both top and bottom boards. The fence curves inward to the gate to provide a parking area off the road. The wide gate leading to the front sidewalk has squared, flat-topped posts. A fence of the same description appears in an 1882 Elliott lithograph and is shown extending along the east side of the yard and partially across the north side.

8. Garage. On the south side of Centerville Road, the garage has a sloping shed-type roofline with a shingled mansard front above sliding doors on the east facade. Estimated construction date is c. 1910.

9. Sanctum and outbuildings. South of the road and west of the creek, the Sanctum is a 1 1/2-story, gabled-roof farmhouse with a one-story rear extension. It was built in 1892 after a fire destroyed the 1880 structure that preceded it. The Sanctum housed the hired men and the cook who provided their meals a place of their own. A second fire caused substantial damage in late 1959 which was repaired.

The house now provides modern living for one family and is not open to the public. To the rear of the house are two outbuildings, both single-storied and gable-roofed. The larger one, was used as a woodshed, and the smaller building contained the freezer for the cook house.

10. Truck shed. This building is south of the garage and is a long, low structure with a gabled roof.

11. Storehouse. South of the truck shed is a small, gabled building with exposed rafter ends and wide, vertical board siding. It was used to store fuels for the ranch.

12. Equipment barn. Adjacent to the storehouse is a long, low gable-roofed building with sliding doors on the north side whose estimated construction date is the 1940s.

13. Horse barn. The large, gabled portion of the barn dates to the early days of the ranch. The construction is mortise and tenon with hand-hewn timbers, pole rafters, and wooden pegs. A sloping-roof shed on the west has sliding doors along the west wall where the horse-drawn equipment was stored and a single sliding door on the south leading to the tie stalls where the draft horses were stabled. The worn-down boards of the mangers and chewed feed boxes attest to the horses which stood in the wood floored stalls.

14. Sheep barn. One-quarter mile up the creek from the horse barn, the sheep barn has a steeply sloping shed roof, sliding door on the north end, and wide vertical board siding. An attached shed at the northwest corner, is a portion of a cow barn. Wooden stanchions and mangers line the wall, but it is now used for sheep. A large, circular concrete wall below ground level and outside the barn, could have been within the original barn and may have been the base of a silo. In 1899 and 1900, large barns with silos were being built by the Russ family. This was also reported as completed by the Ferndale Enterprise on July 25, 1899. Yet another barn was built at Fern Cottage in 1900 with a 240 short tons (220 tonnes) silo.

15. Hay shed. South of the sheep barn, this structure has a gabled roofline, corrugated metal roof, exposed rafter ends under the eaves and a fence-style wall on the west which is open at the top. It was originally for dried and stored firewood. It may be the 1897 barn which was reported to include a silo inside it. A cabin nearby, no longer standing, housed the hired man who cut, split and stored 100 cords of wood a year for the stoves in Fern Cottage and the Sanctum.

However, regarding barns on the property, note that one burned in 1928.

An apple house once stood across the creek from the cottage near where the Russ built private schoolhouse once stood.

== Legacy ==
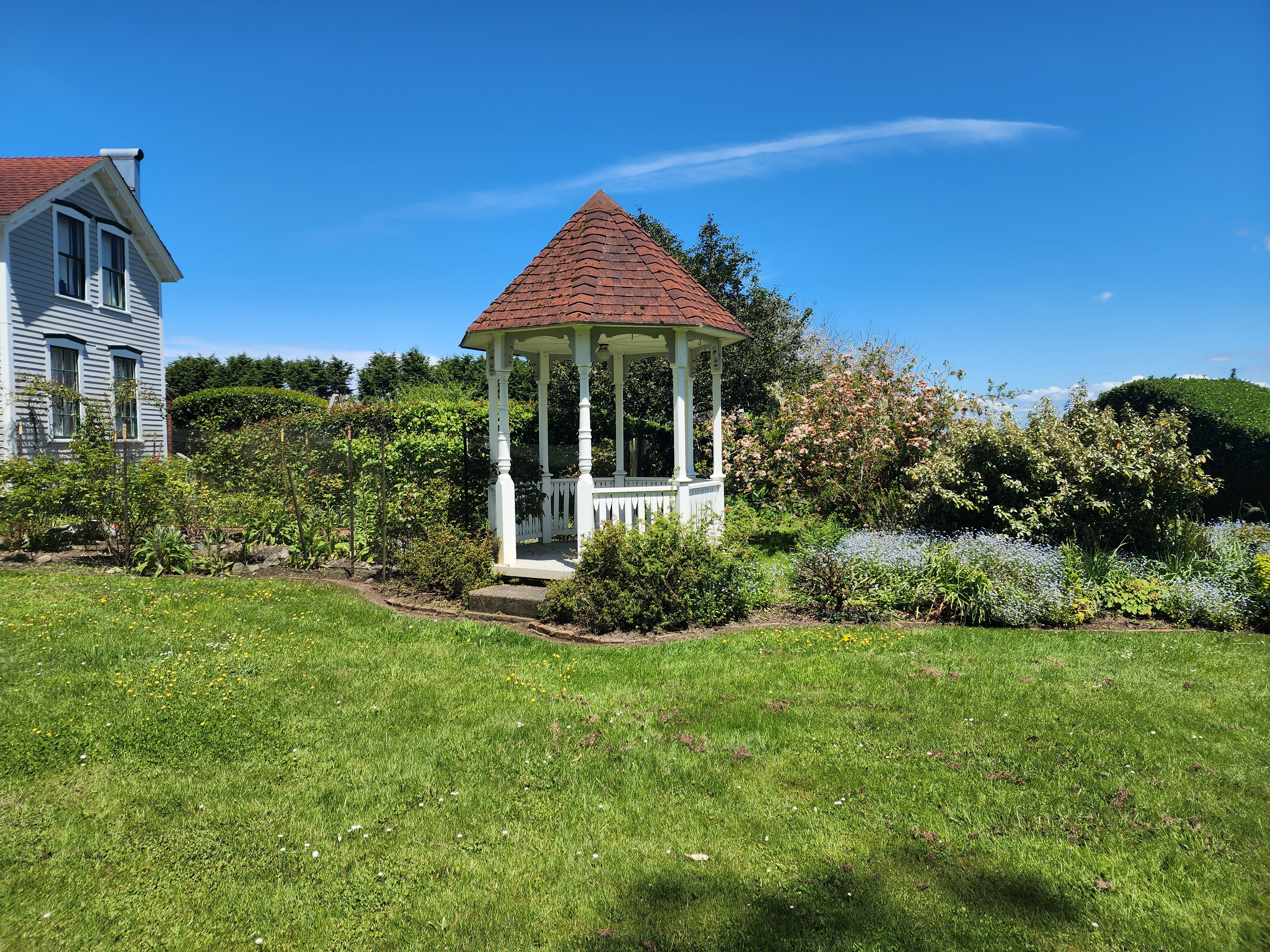
Gazebo rose garden, 2023

The extensive archives of Fern Cottage have provided documentation, including photographs, for historical publications.

Possibly the first wedding to occur at Fern Cottage was held in 1891 for friends of the family. Another was held in 1897. Today, weddings occur each year in the gardens.

Similarly, at least three memorial services have been held at Fern Cottage between 1994 and 2026.

Fern Cottage, owned by the non-profit Fern Cottage Foundation, is now a house museum (tours by appointment) and events venue.

== See also ==
- Ferndale Museum
- List of museums in the North Coast (California)
