= Carnegie Free Library (Eureka, California) =

- U.S. National Register of Historic Places
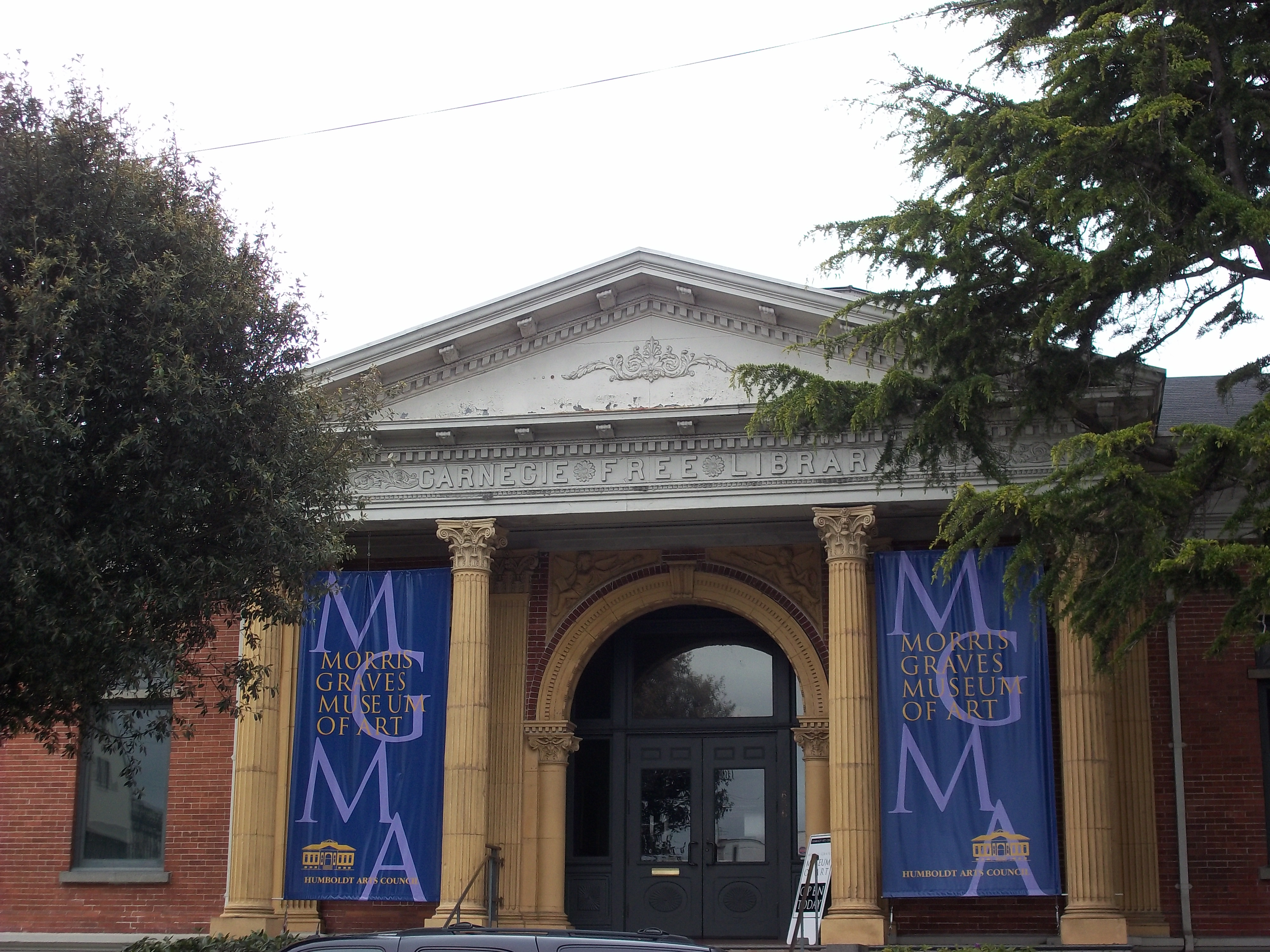
- The front view of the Eureka Carnegie Library, now the Morris Graves Museum of Art.

- Location within California Location within the United States
- Location: 636 F Street, Eureka, California
- Coordinates: 40°48′2″N 124°9′52″W
- Area: 0.3 acres (0.12 ha)
- Built: 1902
- Architect: Evans, Knowles & Trarver, B.C.; Foster, Ambrose
- Architectural style: Classical Revival
- NRHP reference No.: 86000101
- Added to NRHP: January 23, 1986

The Carnegie Free Library in Eureka, California was built in Classical Revival Style in 1902. It was listed on the National Register of Historic Places in 1986, and currently houses the Morris Graves Museum of Art.

== History ==
The first reading rooms and libraries in Eureka date from 1859, but they were not stable. The 1878 California Rogers Free Library Act permitted incorporated towns and cities to raise a tax for free reading rooms and public libraries. Eureka was the first city to finance a public library under the Rogers Act and housed its library in rented quarters.

After receiving a $20,000 Carnegie library grant in 1901, the library trustees held a competition and selected local architects Knowles Evans and B.C. Tarver of Eureka to design the building from red brick and Mad River granite exterior with two story solid redwood columns ringing a colorful tile mosaic floor in the domed rotunda. When contractor Ambrose Foster ran over budget, the trustees sought but failed to obtain an additional $10,000 from Carnegie. Changes to the building were few, but the original dome was removed; only a skylight remains.

The Library was added to the National Register of Historic Places in 1986; recognized both as a Carnegie Library and an example of Classical Revival architecture in a nearly-original condition.

In 1996, the City of Eureka and the Humboldt Arts Council helped save the Library which had been slated for demolition. The capital campaign to save the library raised $1.5 million from corporations, foundations and the local community. Restoration began in 1999 and the Library was converted to house a newly created Museum of Art, named after founding patron, northwest school artist Morris Graves, which opened on January 1, 2000.

== See also ==
- List of Carnegie libraries in the United States
