= Lower Lake Schoolhouse Museum =

Local history museum in Lower Lake, California

- Established: 1993
- Location: 16435 Main Street; Lower Lake, California
- Coordinates: 38.909943°N 122.605419°W
- Type: Local history
- Website: County of Lake California

The Lower Lake Schoolhouse Museum is a local history museum located in Lower Lake, California.

== History ==
Built in 1877, the building served as a schoolhouse until 1935 when it was sold to the local Masonic lodge. In 1993, the building was restored and the first floor was opened as a museum.
