= Clarke Historical Museum =

Historical museum in Eureka, California, US

- Bank of Eureka Building
- U.S. National Register of Historic Places
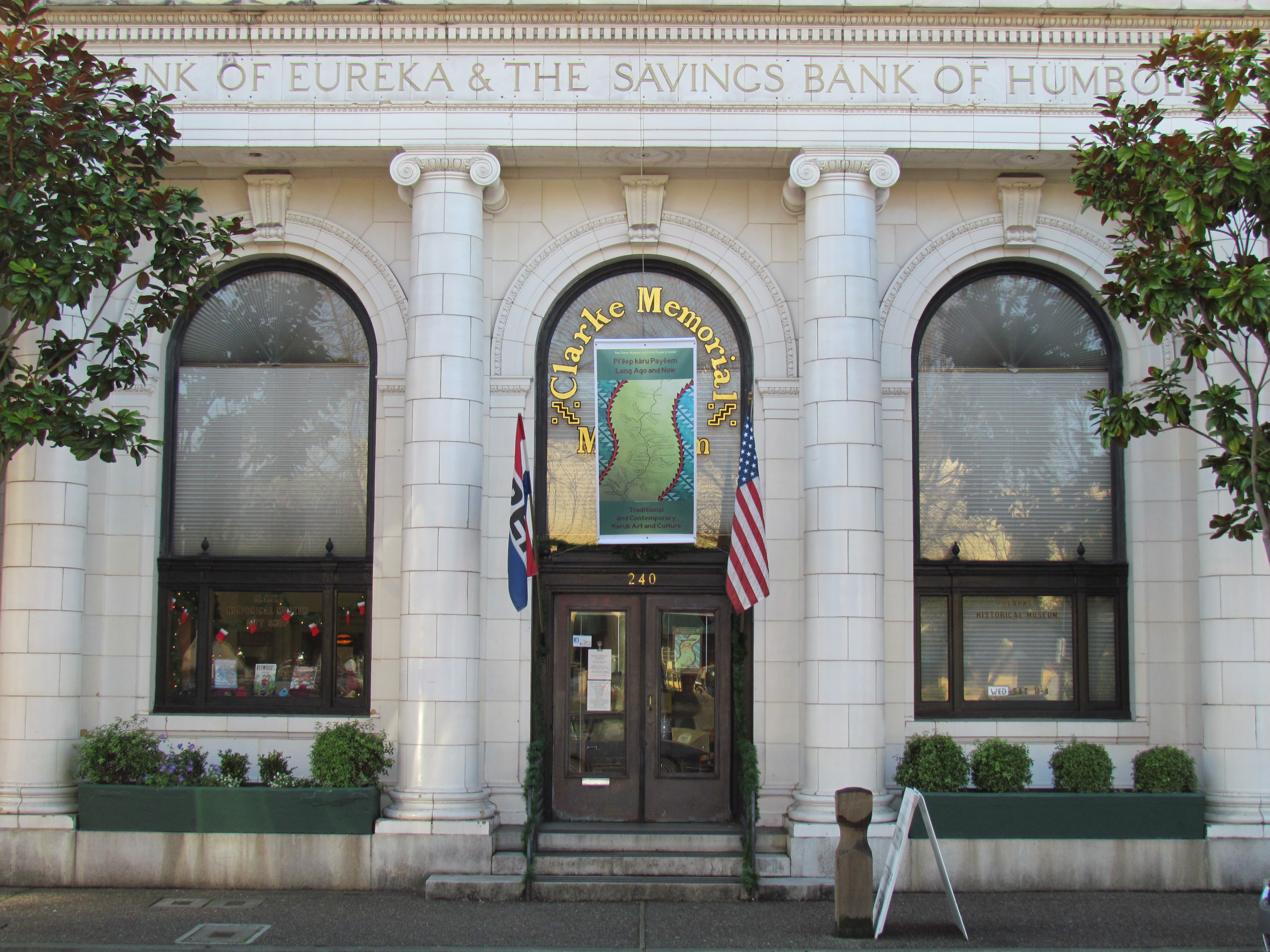
- Clarke Historical Museum, December 2010

- Location within California Location within the United States
- Location: 240 E Street, Eureka, California
- Coordinates: 40°48′13″N 124°9′59″W
- Area: less than one acre
- Built: 1911
- Architect: Albert Pissis
- Architectural style: Renaissance Revival
- Part of: Old Town Eureka
- NRHP reference No.: 82002180
- Added to NRHP: April 12, 1982

The Clarke Historical Museum (formerly the Clarke Memorial Museum) in Eureka, California contains the area's premier collection of California North Coast regional and cultural history. The facility houses a Native American wing, Nealis Hall, which features an internationally recognized collection of basketry, regalia, stoneware, implements, and other objects indicative of the culture and creativity of local and regional Native American groups including the Wiyot (on whose ancestral territory the Clarke resides), Yurok, Karuk and Hupa Tribes. The Clarke Museum is a 501(c)3 nonprofit.

== History ==
The Clarke Historical Museum was founded by Cecile Clarke (1885–1979). Miss Clarke was a local history teacher at Eureka High School. It was at there that she first started displaying her collection of local Native American basketry. In 1960, when the school ran out of room for her increasing collection of local history items, Miss Clarke sold her family sheep ranch and used the money to buy the Bank of Eureka building, where she moved her collection. Miss Clarke taught for over 40 years and dedicated her life to the museum. Originally named the Clarke Memorial Museum, after her parents, it was renamed the Clarke Historical Museum in 2001, and is now a privately operated non-profit organization for the use, benefit, and awareness of the City of Eureka, surrounding cities and the local Native American tribes. The Native American wing, Nealis Hall, was built in 1979.

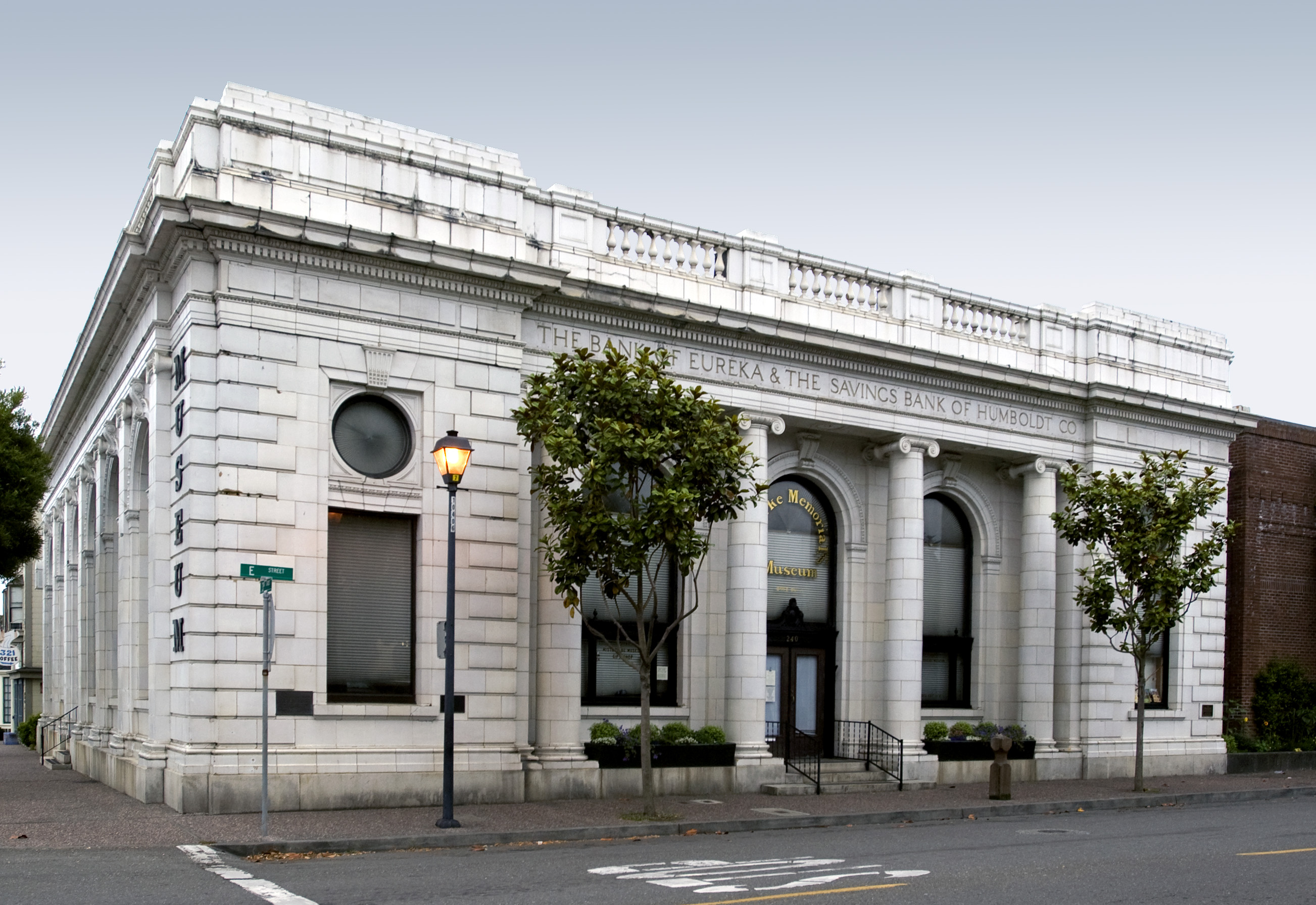
The former bank building housing the museum.

The museum is housed in the former The Bank of Eureka & The Savings Bank of Humboldt Building (1911) in Old Town Eureka, which is listed on the National Register of Historic Places both as an individual landmark and as a contributing building to the Eureka Historic District. The bank building was designed by noted San Francisco architect Albert Pissis in a Classical Revival or Neoclassical style. The building is notable for its glazed architectural terra-cotta facade. Quoined pavilions flank the recessed portico supported by ionic columns and an extensive balustraded parapet appears above the cornice.

== See also ==
- Humboldt Bay Maritime Museum
- Humboldt County Historical Society
- List of museums in the North Coast (California)
