= Blue Lake Museum =

Museum in California

- Location: 330 Railroad Avenue; Blue Lake, California
- Coordinates: 40°52′51.66″N 123°59′25.37″W
- Type: History
- Website: bluelakemuseum.org

The Blue Lake Museum, located in the former Arcata and Mad River Railroad depot at Railroad and G Streets, Blue Lake, California, has photos and artifacts of Blue Lake pioneer, local Indian, logging and railroad history.

== An Abbreviated History of the Blue Lake Museum ==
In 1883 the Korbel brothers, Francis, Anton and Joseph, founded the Arcata & Mad River Railroad. The railroad was intended to extend an existing line in north Humboldt Bay, through Blue Lake and to their Humboldt Lumber Mill Co. This Northern Fork could carry 425,000 board-feet of Mad River redwood per sailing to the San Francisco and southern California markets. It provided daily freight and passenger service to Arcata, and the world beyond. The railroad is said to be the key to Blue Lake's early commercial and cultural success, and is a Registered California State Historic Landmark. The structure that houses the Blue Lake Museum was a depot for the railroad, and also served as the town's post office.

The Arcata & Mad River Railroad Depot now functions as The Blue Lake Museum, a free public museum devoted to railroading, logging, and living in the Mad River Valley. The museum displays artifacts from the booming days of Redwood Country, featuring the Ruth Everding Libbey collection of Native American basketry, the Korbel and Northern Redwood Lumber Company room, and extensive research resources. The museum is maintained and staffed by local volunteers, and is funded solely by memberships, donations, and fundraisers. The museum is open to the public April through September and by appointment in the winter.

== Theft and recovery ==
Seven antique Indian Yurok and Hoopa basket hats from the Ruth Everding Libby basket collection were stolen in January 2012 after a breaking and entering at the museum but recovered by authorities after a Eureka shop owner recognized the hats and alerted police.
