= Arlynda Corners, California =

Coordinates: 40°35′41″N 124°15′18″W

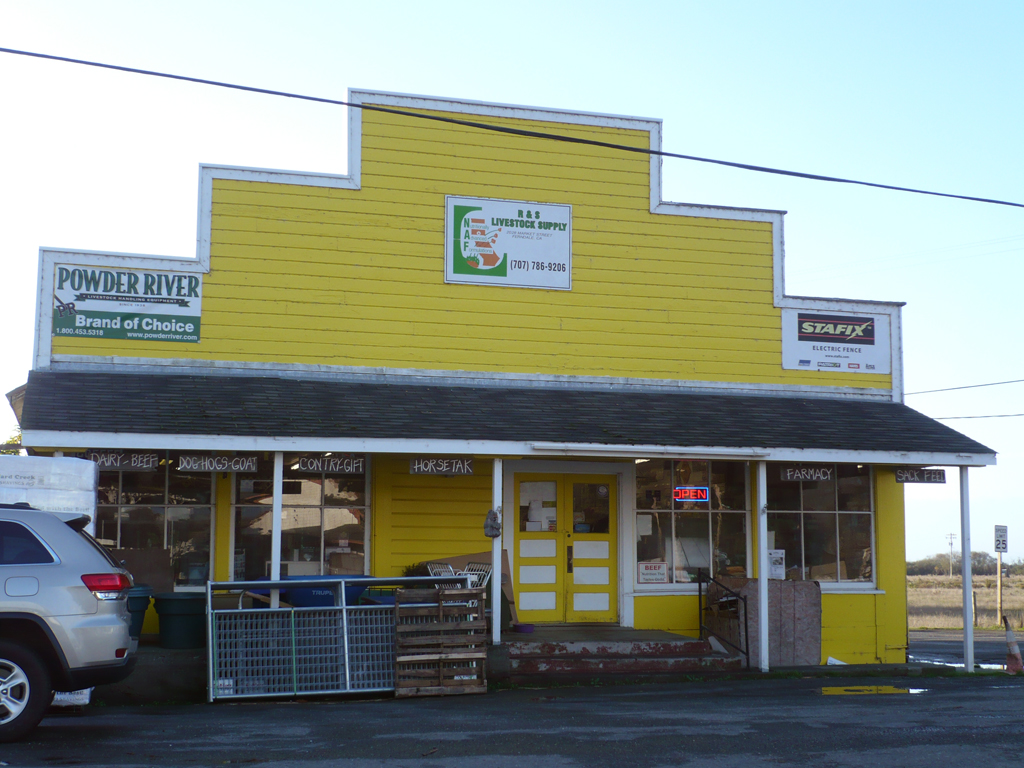
Arlynda Corners

Arlynda Corners is a locality in Humboldt County, California. It lies at an elevation of 13 feet (4.0 m).

The name "Arlynda" was selected in 1882. Arlynda Corners was a cross-roads village between Ferndale and Port Kenyon, California. Currently a few buildings remain of the original town at Market Streets and Port Kenyon Roads.
