= SS Northerner =

American mail steamer

Coordinates: 40°34′21.94″N 124°21′22.71″W

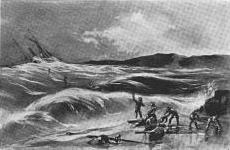
- Northerner Wrecked on Centerville Beach

History

United States
- Owner: Spofford, Tileston & Company; Pacific Mail Steamship Company
- Builder: William H. Brown, New York City
- Cost: $75,000
- In service: 1847
- Out of service: January 6, 1860
- Fate: Wrecked

General characteristics
- Type: Mail Steamer
- Tonnage: 1,000
- Length: 203.6 ft (62.1 m)
- Decks: 2
- Propulsion: Side-lever by Novelty Iron Works
- Masts: 3

SS Northerner was an American mail steamer in service from 1847 until her wreck in 1860. She was built alongside the SS Southerner in 1847 by William H. Brown for the Spofford & Tileston Company. The ships served the company's line of steamers serving the East Coast of the United States. Northerner was sold in 1850 and sent to the Pacific, where she was then purchased by the Pacific Mail Steamship Company. Her route ran between San Francisco and Panama until 1853, when she was placed on a more northerly route between San Francisco and the coastal Pacific Northwest.

On January 6, 1860, Northerner was sailing northbound by California's North Coast with 58 passengers and 53 crew. The ship struck a submerged rock, wrecking on the beach a few miles south of the entrance to Humboldt Bay. 38 people died: 17 passengers and 21 crew. Survivors made their way to shore and were aided by local people. Northerner was the first paddle steamer lost in operations by the Pacific Mail Steamship Company.

== History ==
Northerner was built in 1847 by William H. Brown, of New York City, as a companion to the SS Southerner for the Spofford & Tileston Company's line of steamers serving Charleston, South Carolina and the East Coast of the United States. In 1850, Northerner was sold to a Mr. Howard and sent to the Pacific under Captain Waterman. Subsequently, purchased by the Pacific Mail Steamship Company she was initially placed in service between San Francisco and Panama.

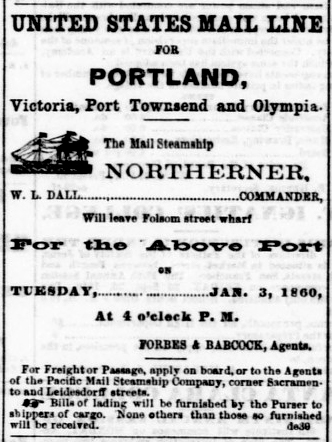
The last sailing notice for Northerner, January 3, 1860

In January, 1851, Northerner arrived from San Francisco with $2,600,000 in gold dust and treasure on board, and carrying 500 passengers. In August, 1851 Northerner broke the shaft of her starboard wheel soon after leaving Panama. She completed the voyage to San Francisco using only one paddle wheel, in 22 days, arriving September 8, 1851, with 20 tons of freight and 350 passengers, including mutineers from the passenger ship Commodore Stockton who had to be clapped in irons for disorderly conduct by the captain.

After 1853, the Northerner was placed on a more northerly route, carrying mails and passengers between San Francisco and Oregon as far as the Columbia River and the gold fields at Fraser River, arriving for the first time on September 3, 1858.

On October 10, 1858, southbound from Olympia to San Francisco, Northerner was hit broadside by the Steam Tug Resolute in Dana's Straits. Since thousands of dollars of damage was done to both vessels, and it was a clear night in a mile-wide passage, the ship owners filed cross-suits in the Washington Territorial Courts. The owners of the Resolute were unsatisfied with the Washington's court decision, and filed their case in the U.S. Supreme Court.

Northerner sailed for the last time from San Francisco with 108 persons on board at the time of the wreck, 58 passengers and 53 crew. The ship hit a submerged rock and wrecked on January 6, 1860, on Centerville Beach, California, a few miles south of the entrance to Humboldt Bay. Thirty-eight people died: 17 were passengers and 21 crew. One of those who died was Francis Blomfield, son of the late Bishop of London, Charles James Blomfield. Seventy others made their way through crashing surf to shore and were aided by local people including Seth Kinman and Arnold Berding.

The Centerville Beach Cross marks the resting place of some of the victims whose bodies were recovered.

In December 1863, the U.S. Supreme Court (68 U.S. 682), ruled Northerner was at fault for steering across the path of the Resolute.
