= Ferndale Public Library =

Library in California, United States

- U.S. National Register of Historic Places
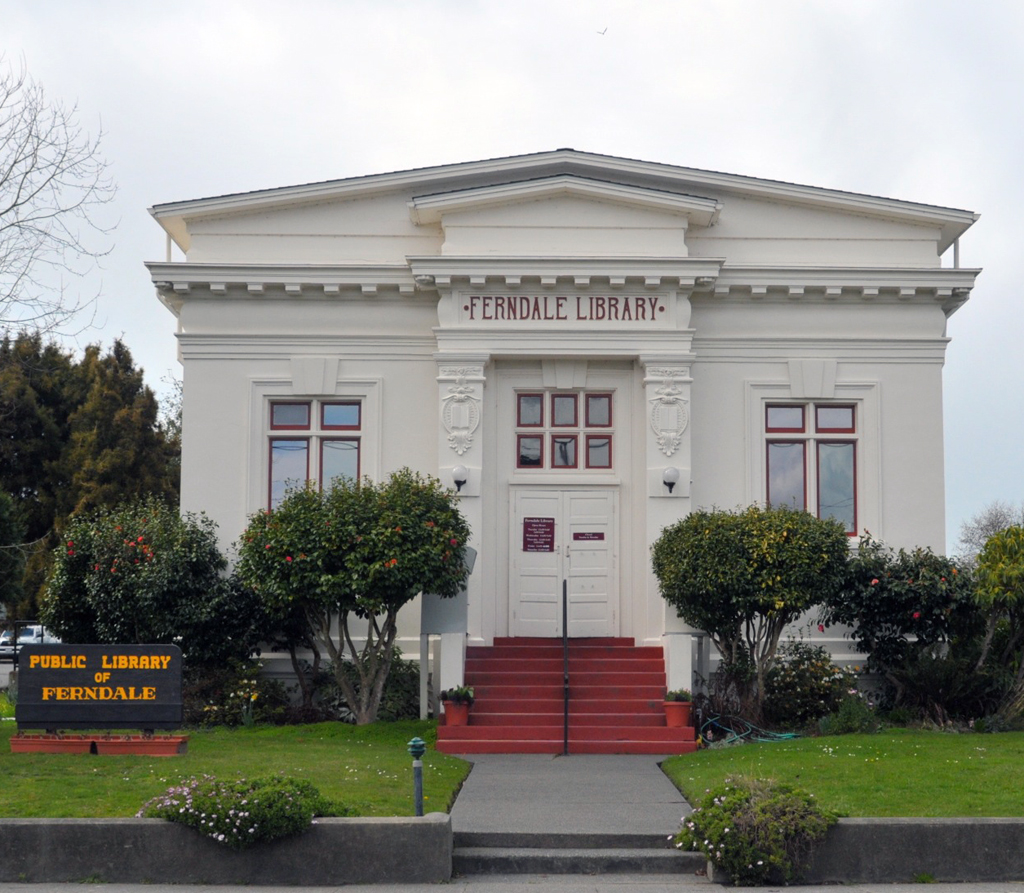
- Ferndale's Classical Revival Carnegie Library

- Location within California Location within the United States
- Location: 807 Main Street, Ferndale, California
- Coordinates: 40°34′47″N 124°15′36″W
- Area: less than one acre
- Built: 1909
- Architect: Warren Skellings
- Architectural style: Classical Revival
- MPS: California Carnegie Libraries MPS
- NRHP reference No.: 90001815
- Added to NRHP: December 10, 1990

The Ferndale Public Library was built in 1909 as a Carnegie Grant Library on donated land and supported by the city of Ferndale, California, until becoming part of the Humboldt County Library system in 1915. It is the only Carnegie Library in northwestern California still functioning as a Public Library.

== Early history ==
The first free reading room in Ferndale opened on 3 February 1896 on the ground floor of the Gilt Edge Building with books from the old town library and the Chapin library. The Ferndale Enterprise newspaper reported the hours of operation and added that "Smoking, loud talking, spitting on the floor, etc. will be strictly prohibited by the management," but by 12 February 1897, the reading room closed for lack of support.

On November 30, 1904 a free public library reading room was set up in the Paine building at the corner of Main and Washington streets.

Two years later, on 18 April 1906, Ferndale was struck by the Great San Francisco earthquake. The Ferndale Enterprise reported that the Paine building was "twisted and the plate glass windows were demolished." The Gilt Edge building, where the reading room had been, was so completely ruined by the earthquake that it had to be demolished in 1908.

== The Carnegie Library ==
The city council corresponded with James Bertram, an assistant of Andrew Carnegie, in 1908 to obtain the Carnegie Foundation Grant for $8,000, which was equal to ten times the amount the town would contribute per year to support it.

Architect Warren Skellings of Eureka, California, designed a one-story reinforced concrete building in Classical Revival style to fit on a 40 foot by 40 foot area, deeded to the town of Ferndale by Adam Putnam, and according to the deed of transfer "if not so used, then to revert to the grantor." Construction was awarded to Ackerman and Ackerman of Eureka for $7,775.40 on April 12, 1909. Furnishings were extra, so the city of Ferndale agreed to loan the extra money.

The Paine building was leased by a showman for a movie theater, and in May 1909, the library temporarily moved into the Brelle Building, at Main and Shaw Streets opposite the Knights of Pythias Castle, until the new library building was ready.

On 29 October 1909, a 6.0 magnitude earthquake centered a few miles southeast of town broke the large glass panes in the front of the Brelle building.

As the new building neared completion, citizens questioned why the building bore the label "Ferndale Library" instead of "Carnegie Library". The Ferndale Enterprise of 5 November 1909 explained that it was "the express wish of Mr. Carnegie that his name should be omitted. Some of the first of the library buildings made possible by his generosity bore his name, but on later ones this has been left off by his desire," and added that an "unostentatious" tablet would be placed inside the building with a hope "that gentleman will perhaps not object to our people commemorating his name."

Construction dragged on while a wood-burning furnace and electrical fittings were shipped and installed; the city council became concerned because they were also paying for the rental on the temporary facility at the Brelle Building, but on 15 March 1910 new the library building was accepted as ready for occupancy.

The library formally opened on 2 April 1910. By 1911, the Ferndale Village Club ladies had begun to plant the grounds and installed cement walkways, but a neighbor's cattle kept escaping onto the library grounds and eating the plantings. In 1912, cattle-proof concrete walls were built and library trustees were able to repay the town the $264.40 loaned during construction. In a sign of increasing regionalisation in Humboldt County, the Ferndale Library became a branch of the Humboldt County Library System in 1915.

The building has been continually maintained. An updated furnace was added in 1926 and, in 1977, a rear addition enlarged the original building to include a children's room, a bathroom and storage, but the style and original furnishings were retained.

The Eureka and Ferndale Public Libraries were the only two Carnegie Grant libraries in northwestern California, but only the Ferndale Library is still functioning as a public library with original bookcases and furniture.

The library was added to the National Register of Historic Places in 1990.
