= Ferndale, California =

City in California, United States

- City
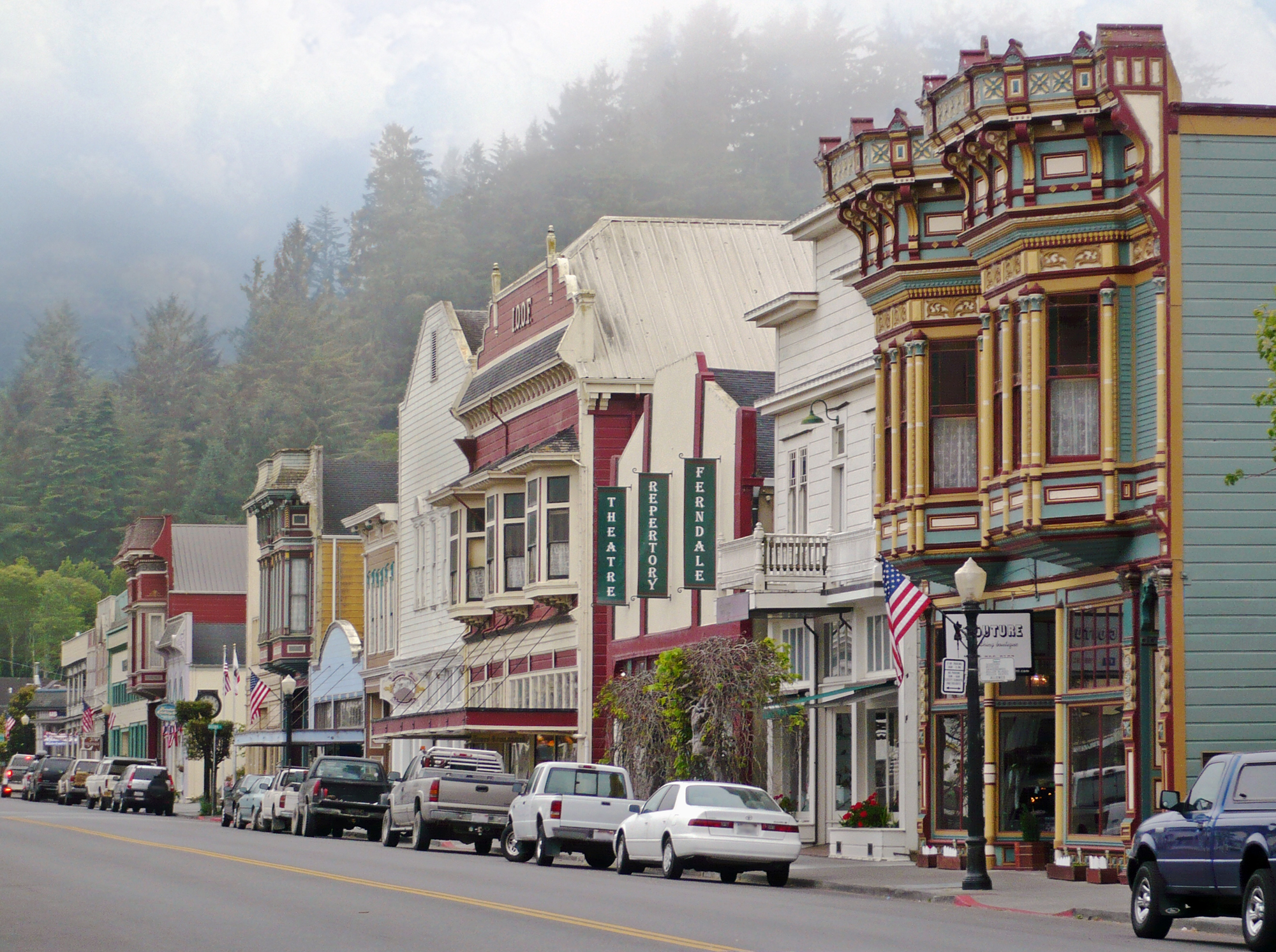
- Main Street in Ferndale

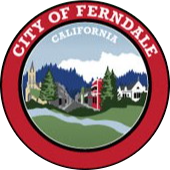
- Seal
- Interactive map of Ferndale, California
- Location in the United States
- Coordinates: 40°34.6′N 124°15.8′W
- Country: United States
- State: California
- County: Humboldt
- Incorporated: August 28, 1893

Government
  - Type: Council–manager government
  - Mayor: Randy Cady
  - City manager: Jay Parrish

Area
  - Total: 1.20 sq mi (3.11 km^{2})
  - Land: 1.20 sq mi (3.11 km^{2})
  - Water: 0 sq mi (0.00 km^{2}) 0%
- Elevation: 56 ft (17 m)

Population (2020)
  - Total: 1,398
  - Density: 1,166/sq mi (450/km^{2})
- Time zone: UTC-8 (Pacific)
  - Summer (DST): UTC-7 (PDT)
- ZIP Code: 95536
- Area code: 707
- FIPS code: 06-23910
- GNIS feature IDs: 277513, 2410497
- Website: ci.ferndale.ca.us

California Historical Landmark
- Reference no.: 883

Ferndale is a city in Humboldt County, California, United States. Its population was 1,398 at the 2020 census, up from 1,371 at the 2010 census. The city is well known for its dozens of well-preserved Victorian storefronts and homes. Ferndale is the northern gateway to California's Lost Coast and the city, which is sited on the edge of a wide plain near the mouth of the Eel River, is also located near extensive preserves of coast redwood forests.

== History ==
Before American settlement, Ferndale was a glade of giant ferns reaching more than six feet (1.8 m), surrounded by alder, willow, Sitka spruce, Douglas fir, coast redwood, swampy land, and windswept prairies. The area was populated by the southern Wiyot people, and centered along the Eel River, where they caught lamprey eels, salmon and sturgeon in iris leaf fish nets and collected shellfish along the river and at its mouth, while cultivating a California species of tobacco.

The town was established in 1852 from settlement by Willard Allard, Seth Louis Shaw, and his brother, American portrait painter Stephen William Shaw. The settlement was incorporated in 1893.

=== Early settlers ===
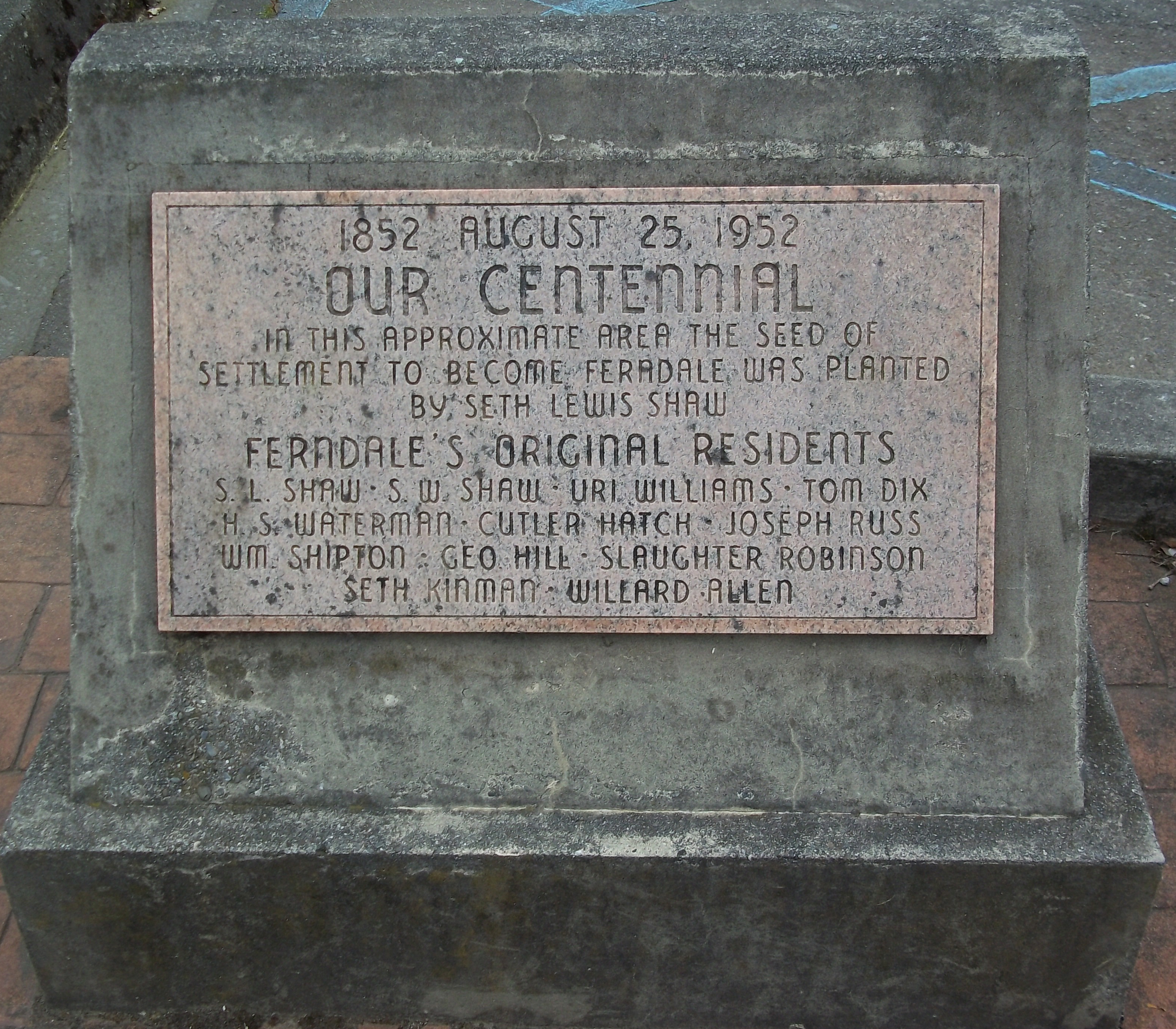
The marble Centennial Plaque for Ferndale, California, on Main Street, erected in 1952

In August 1852, Allard and the Shaw brothers borrowed a canoe from the Wiyots in the Table Bluff area and paddled it across the Eel and up Francis Creek to arrive with their supplies in the approximate vicinity of what is now Main and Shaw streets. In September 1852, they cleared a five-acre area of ferns and began building a cabin near the base of the Wildcat Road even though Allard was sick with ague. By January 1853, twelve men were living in the Shaws' cabin including Seth Kinman, who provided the group with meat, and Joseph Russ. About this time, Stephen Shaw painted the portrait of Wiyot elder Kiwelattah (or Ki-we-lah-tah) and kept a detailed journal of two years of trying to grow plants in cold coastal fog.

Seth Shaw settled in the area now marked by Main and Lewis streets where he began construction of the Gothic Revival style Shaw House on his property in 1854. The Shaw House served as the area's first polling place in 1854, post office and courthouse in 1863. in 1860 Seth Shaw was justice of the peace and postmaster, and his home served for many gatherings, although it was not finished until 1866. After having been away from the area for two years, Stephen Shaw sold his holdings in 1856 to Welsh-born Francis Francis (1818–1877) who later established the city's water system through pipes first laid in 1875.

Other small towns were established around Ferndale, including Centerville, Port Kenyon, Waddington, Grizzly Bluff, and Arlynda Corners. Produce from Ferndale was shipped out via Centerville and transferred to ships at anchor offshore prior to the opening of docks at Port Kenyon in 1876.

While the earliest settlers were English-speaking from Great Britain, New England, Canada, or Ireland, waves of immigrants arrived in Ferndale from Denmark, Switzerland, Germany, Italy, Portugal, and China.

=== Chinese settlement ===
Chinese immigrants arrived in California in the earliest California gold rush days of the late 1840s, and were settled in all parts of Humboldt County almost as soon as English-speaking whites. They worked in gold mining on the Klamath and Trinity Rivers, before settling mostly in Eureka, with a few in outlying towns like Ferndale where two Chinese men owned clothes-washing businesses. Chinese laborers built parts of the Wildcat Road between Ferndale and Petrolia, dug out the water reservoirs for the Francis Water Company and worked at two fish canneries on the Eel River, although – as was the case in the rest of California – they were not truly welcome.

=== European immigration ===
Germans began to arrive in the 1850s. The first was businessman Arnold Berding in 1857. Most Germans worked on ranches or were dairymen, but at least one owned the Milwaukee Brewery Depot Saloon. United States Congressman Don Clausen is descended from German settlers of Ferndale. German settlers organized St. Mark's Lutheran Church in 1906. Except for three Portuguese brothers who arrived in the 1870s and a few from mainland Portugal, most came from the Azores islands between 1900 and 1915. Ferndale Portuguese have celebrated their traditional Festival of the Holy Ghost since 1924. Danish settlers founded and built Our Savior's Lutheran Church in 1899 and dedicated Danish Hall, which had been built as a warehouse by Arnold Berding in the late 1880s, on October 10, 1929. The Swiss who settled in Ferndale from Italian- and German-speaking families included the Oeschgers, who moved to Ferndale in time for Joe Oeschger to play baseball at Ferndale High School before going to a career in Major League Baseball. A later influx of Romansh Swiss included the ancestors of College Football Hall of Fame coach Len Casanova. Sausage-making, salami-making and wine-making can be traced to Italians who arrived later than the Danish and Swiss, beginning around 1897.

=== Chinese expulsions ===
In 1885, after a city councilman of the county seat Eureka was shot dead in the crossfire from two warring Chinese tong gangs, 480 Chinese residents were rounded up in two days and forced to relocate to San Francisco. A year later, the Cutting Packing Company brought in a crew of Chinese for the season. Following a heated meeting at Roberts Hall in Ferndale between local residents and an upset delegation from Eureka, the company guaranteed the workers would come nowhere near town and they were allowed to stay until the fishing season was over in December. Chinese crews were used again at the same cannery in 1887 and 1889.

In 1906, Eureka and Fortuna citizens were again up in arms at Ferndale's violation of the unwritten law of the county when the Starbuck–Talent Canning Company of Port Kenyon brought in 23 Chinese and four Japanese to work at the cannery. After threats of mass action, the Chinese were taken to an old cookhouse on Indian Island from which all whites were barred and where they were held until they left by sea. The Japanese were permitted to keep working for Starbuck–Talent.

=== Business and communications ===
Dairies were founded from the Bear River Ridge to the south side of the Eel River starting in the late 1860s. Filled kegs of butter were transported along the beach river by four-horse teams from the Mattole to Centerville or Port Kenyon and the teams returned supplies from Ferndale. The 81 dairies from the southern area faded as the land along the Eel River Valley was settled for dairying, first by the Danes and later by other settlers. In the 1880s, multiple cooperative creameries in the Eel River valley began to process milk into butter; by 1904, the Central Creamery on Main Street Ferndale had combined the smaller operations into a more modern production facility.

The use of paper wrapping on butter to reduce air oxidation was pioneered in Ferndale at the suggestion of Chester E. Gray (1881–1944) from the U.S. Department of Agriculture who studied the problem of unrefrigerated fine butter turning white within hours of production. Gray patented a new spray-drying process (U.S. Patent #858,868 – 1907 and #1,157,935 – 1915) and went into business with Central Creamery owner Aage Jensen in a new dry-milk manufacturing process that used non-fat milk solids which had formerly been waste of the process. Their new plant processed 75,000 pounds of milk a day, shipping to San Francisco and filling contracts for the U.S. Navy. The first motorized milk truck was used here.

In 1916, Grey and Jensen moved to San Francisco and changed the company name to Golden State Creamery. Local Ferndale resident and Eureka newspaper editor Andrew Genzoli began recording the history of the Ferndale dairies during this time, culminating in scrapbooks of newspaper clippings from 1910 to 1954.

Ferndale was a crossroads village and provided lodging, horses, blacksmithing and other services both to individual travelers and the Overland Stage and Express line which ran from Eureka to Cloverdale with connections to San Francisco; over 80 hours of traveling for a cost of $20. The first stage line was founded in 1862 with daily trips from Eureka, Centerville, and Petrolia. In 1868, twice weekly stages ran to San Francisco and by 1871 daily service was available. The first automobiles were used for the stage runs in 1911, the same year as Fernbridge (bridge) was built, eliminating the need for ferry boat service.

In 1878, regular service on steamships carried produce, cargo and passengers from Port Kenyon, where, by 1897, 188,652 pounds of wool and 965,010 pounds of butter were shipped out along with grains, chickens, potatoes, lumber, eggs, hides, vegetables, and salmon. The steamer trade declined as the Salt River silted up, and the transport hub shifted to Eureka. The completion of the Northwestern Pacific Railroad in 1914 allowed for speedier transportation to Eureka and the San Francisco area. The track was built about five miles to the northwest of Ferndale in Fernbridge.

Main Street businesses supplied the needs of not only the Ferndale area, but for the inland Mattole Valley as well. They included banks, hotels, stables, variety and merchandise stores, hardware and grocery stores, farm and machine implements, butchers, blacksmiths shoemakers, barbers, tailors, milliners, saloons and gambling halls, billiard parlors, coopers, doctors, dentists, drug stores, lawyers, engineers, surveyors, real estate agents, several photographers, furniture makers, undertakers, a telegraph office, and a Wells–Fargo office.

Telephone and telegraph wires were run into the valley by private companies in the 1890s; by 1899, it was said that the telephone was in "almost universal use in this valley." In 1900, the telephone line was extended to the Mattole Oil fields in Petrolia. In 1911, the Eel River and Southern Telephone company consolidated operations around Ferndale, and, on February 6, 1960, dial telephones were introduced; the old switchboard and crank phones are on display at the Ferndale Museum.

The Ferndale Enterprise newspaper was founded on May 11, 1878, by three sons of the local Methodist minister and has published continuously since then, while moving offices and shifting from semi-weekly to weekly publication.

=== Incorporation and services ===
Ferndale incorporated with a vote of 89 in favor and 47 against on August 17, 1893, primarily to organize drainage and prevent dogs and other animals from running loose, according to the earliest ordinances enacted. In 1915, the current firehouse was built as a combined firehouse and city hall.

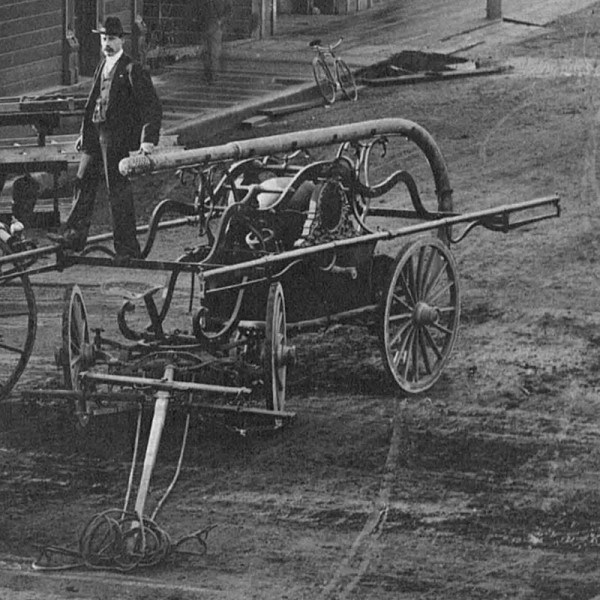
The Hunneman side-stroke torrent pumper used by Ferndale for over 40 years, pictured outside the Victorian Inn c. 1890

After the 1875 fire which nearly destroyed south Main street was put out by volunteer bucket brigades, and after other smaller conflagrations, the City purchased a used Hunneman hand pumper fire engine on April 14, 1883. The side-stroke torrent pumper had been built in the 1850s and been shipped west in the 1860s. The name on the side of this engine was "Franklin" because the city bought it from the Franklin Fire Company of San Jose, California. The engine was transferred to the newly formed Ferndale Fire Department when they organized in February 1897. In November 1923, after 41 years in service, the hand pumper was shipped to the American LaFrance Company, "as part payment on the fine new pumper recently purchased by this town." Other sources say the engine was sold to a Hollywood film company.

Modern equipment arrived in 1905 with a motorized pumper engine, in 1917 with a Model T truck with chemical tanks, and in 1948 the Hook and Ladder Company formed. In 1883, water supplies were consolidated in local cisterns under present-day State Route 211 which were later filled in and water from the hill reservoirs was used to supply the hydrants.

In 1902, the fire alarm was placed in a wooden structure at the corner of Brown and Main which fell over in the 1906 earthquake. This led to the bell being hung at the firehouse, and a steam-whistle at the Creamery was used for the fire alarm from 1906 until electric sirens came into use in 1931.

Electrical lighting was installed in May 1896, supplied by a wood-burning steam electric-generating plant that worked between dusk and midnight only; it was replaced in 1903 by a distillate-burning steam electric generator a few blocks east of Main Street. In 1911, the earlier generation and distribution systems were merged into Western States Gas and Electric acquired in 1927 by the Pacific Gas and Electric Company.

The national landmark Ferndale Public Library was completed in 1910 with local funds and an $8,000 Carnegie grant. In 1876, the Ferndale Cemetery Association was established, which manages the 5.03-acre (2.04 ha) burial ground. There is also a Catholic cemetery on Bluff Street.

The Ferndale Museum has educational exhibits of area history, paper records, photographs and also genealogical resources.

== Geography ==
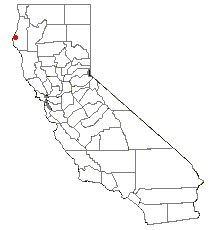
Location of Ferndale, California

Ferndale is located at 40°34.6′N 124°15.8′W. Its location south of US 101, is very close to the mouth of the Eel River as it enters the Pacific Ocean. By car, Ferndale is 265 miles (426 km) north of San Francisco and 12 miles (19 km) south of Eureka. California State Route 211 is the major road connecting the city with US 101. Directly to the south of Ferndale is the Lost Coast region, whose geology and terrain has made it difficult to establish routes through the area. It has thus made that area only accessible by land via small county mountain roads, such as Mattole Road, running from Ferndale south to Petrolia.

According to the United States Census Bureau, Ferndale has a total area of 1.2 square miles (3.1 km^{2}), all land.

=== Earthquakes ===
Ferndale's location near the Mendocino triple junction, a subduction fault associated with the offshore interaction of the Pacific, North American, and Gorda tectonic plates, makes it extremely susceptible to earthquakes. Earthquakes affected Ferndale in the 19th century, but the first to receive widespread news coverage was the 1906 San Francisco earthquake, which damaged more than 40 structures in the downtown, with severe damages to the two brick buildings, and 98 percent of chimneys thrown down. The earthquake was estimated at a Mercalli intensity of VII (Very strong) at Ferndale.

On January 22, 1923, a 7.2 magnitude earthquake centered off Cape Mendocino was said to be nearly as great a shock in Ferndale as the 1906 earthquake and produced a tsunami. Chimneys fell, water mains and plate glass windows broke, and the recently repaired Odd Fellows building fell off its new foundation. The earthquake arrived with a ground rumble and a flash of light.

On August 20, 1927, an earthquake centered about 60 kilometres (37 mi) west of Arcata caused considerable damage around Humboldt Bay, and damage reports from Ferndale included broken chimneys, merchandise tossed from shelves and china and glassware broken.

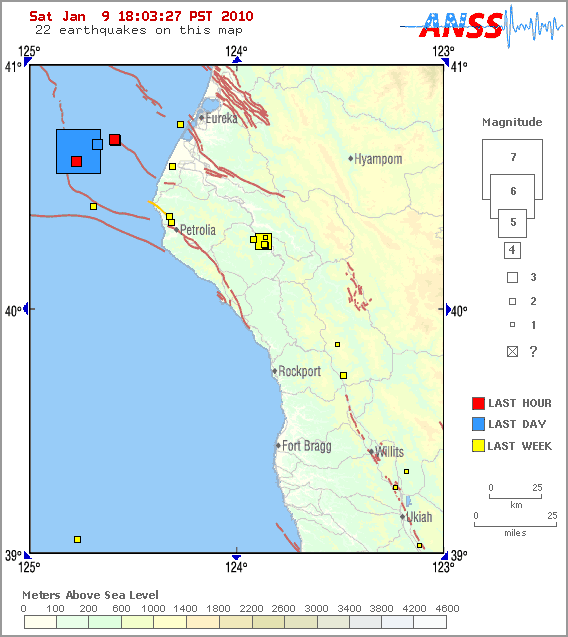
2010 earthquake map

Smaller earthquakes were recorded from the 1920s through the 1980s, but the next big earthquake to strike Ferndale was actually three earthquakes collectively named the 1992 Cape Mendocino earthquakes. The first of these struck on April 25 during the first "Best of the West" festival parade, shattering the glass windows of the stores on Main Street. The brick facade of Valley Grocery collapsed, and police estimated damage to 80 percent of the downtown buildings. Between 30 and 40 houses were knocked off their foundations from the first shock, which was centered about 35 miles (56 km) south of Eureka and had a magnitude of 7.1. The other two large earthquakes hit within 18 hours of the first and were of magnitude 6.5 and 6.7. Both a large landslide and several small landslides occurred on the Mattole Road, which also cracked due to downhill slumping and soil compaction of the road shoulders. Damages in Ferndale were estimated at $10.4 million.

On January 9, 2010, the 6.5 magnitude 2010 Eureka earthquake's epicenter was about 25 miles (40 km) offshore from Ferndale. It was the largest local earthquake since the 1992 Cape Mendocino earthquakes.

On December 20, 2022, the 2022 Ferndale earthquake with a magnitude of 6.4 centered approximately 10 miles (16 km) from Ferndale impacted the city and temporarily closed Fernbridge.

Almost 2 years after that earthquake, on December 5, 2024, the 2024 Cape Mendocino earthquake struck the city. With a magnitude of 7.0, and having an epicenter of only 62 miles (100 km) southwest of Ferndale, the earthquake was felt in the city and the rest of Humboldt County. It also sparked a tsunami warning, but due to the nature of the earthquake, no tsunami materialized.

=== Climate ===
Ferndale's climate is moderated by its proximity to the Pacific Ocean and in the lee of the Wildcat Hills. Winter temperatures rarely go below freezing and summer days are rarely over 80 °F (27 °C). Ferndale has a warm summer Mediterranean climate indicated by the code "Csb" on some weather maps. Ferndale receives most of its roughly 40 inches (1,000 mm) of rain from November to May, with lesser amounts in the summer months. Local microclimates are varied and support tropical palm trees and Sitka spruce, including a mature Sitka forest in Russ Park, and the over 150-foot-tall (46 m) spruce lighted every year for Christmas. Morning fogs are common year round.

A weather station was run in the town from 1963 to 1973. The climate is similar to that of nearby Eureka.

== Demographics ==
Historical population
Census	Pop.	Note	%±
1880	178		—
1890	763		328.7%
1900	846		10.9%
1910	905		7.0%
1920	919		1.5%
1930	889		−3.3%
1940	901		1.3%
1950	1,032		14.5%
1960	1,371		32.8%
1970	1,352		−1.4%
1980	1,367		1.1%
1990	1,331		−2.6%
2000	1,382		3.8%
2010	1,371		−0.8%
2020	1,398		2.0%
U.S. Decennial Census

=== 2020 census ===
As of the 2020 census, Ferndale had a population of 1,398, with a population density of 1,166.0 inhabitants per square mile (450.2/km^{2}). The median age was 48.9 years. The age distribution was 252 people (18.0%) under the age of 18, 115 people (8.2%) aged 18 to 24, 281 people (20.1%) aged 25 to 44, 344 people (24.6%) aged 45 to 64, and 406 people (29.0%) who were 65 years of age or older. For every 100 females, there were 90.2 males, and for every 100 females age 18 and over, there were 86.9 males age 18 and over.

The whole population lived in households. There were 620 households, out of which 158 (25.5%) had children under the age of 18 living in them. Of all households, 278 (44.8%) were married-couple households, 48 (7.7%) were cohabiting couple households, 195 (31.5%) had a female householder with no spouse or partner present, and 99 (16.0%) had a male householder with no spouse or partner present. About 169 households (27.3%) were made up of individuals, and 98 (15.8%) had someone living alone who was 65 years of age or older. The average household size was 2.25, and there were 400 families (64.5% of all households).

There were 719 housing units at an average density of 599.7 units per square mile (231.5 units/km^{2}), of which 620 (86.2%) were occupied. Of these, 396 (63.9%) were owner-occupied and 224 (36.1%) were occupied by renters. 13.8% of housing units were vacant; the homeowner vacancy rate was 1.9% and the rental vacancy rate was 1.3%.

0.0% of residents lived in urban areas, while 100.0% lived in rural areas.

Racial composition as of the 2020 census
Race	Number	Percent
White	1,195	85.5%
Black or African American	5	0.4%
American Indian and Alaska Native	19	1.4%
Asian	17	1.2%
Native Hawaiian and Other Pacific Islander	0	0.0%
Some other race	32	2.3%
Two or more races	130	9.3%
Hispanic or Latino (of any race)	115	8.2%

=== Income and poverty ===
In 2023, the US Census Bureau estimated that the median household income was $62,090, and the per capita income was $36,877. About 5.2% of families and 13.2% of the population were below the poverty line.

=== 2010 census ===
The 2010 United States census reported that Ferndale had a population of 1,371. The population density was 1,335.5 inhabitants per square mile (515.6/km^{2}). The racial makeup of Ferndale was 1,281 (93.4%) White, 1 (0.1%) African American, 22 (1.6%) Native American, 20 (1.5%) Asian, 2 (0.1%) Pacific Islander, 17 (1.2%) from other races, and 28 (2.0%) from two or more races. Hispanic or Latino of any race were 77 persons (5.6%).

The Census reported that 1,371 people (100% of the population) lived in households, 0 (0%) lived in non-institutionalized group quarters, and 0 (0%) were institutionalized.

There were 611 households, out of which 149 (24.4%) had children under the age of 18 living in them, 294 (48.1%) were opposite-sex married couples living together, 55 (9.0%) had a female householder with no husband present, 27 (4.4%) had a male householder with no wife present. There were 38 (6.2%) unmarried opposite-sex partnerships, and 6 (1.0%) same-sex married couples or partnerships. There were 194 households (31.8%) made up of individuals, and 91 (14.9%) had someone living alone who was 65 years of age or older. The average household size was 2.24. There were 376 families (61.5% of all households); the average family size was 2.84.

The population was spread out, with 283 people (20.6%) under the age of 18, 75 people (5.5%) aged 18 to 24, 283 people (20.6%) aged 25 to 44, 422 people (30.8%) aged 45 to 64, and 308 people (22.5%) who were 65 years of age or older. The median age was 47.2 years. For every 100 females, there were 89.6 males. For every 100 females age 18 and over, there were 84.1 males.

There were 717 housing units at an average density of 698.4 units per square mile (269.7 units/km^{2}), of which 611 were occupied, of which 388 (63.5%) were owner-occupied, and 223 (36.5%) were occupied by renters. The homeowner vacancy rate was 1.8%; the rental vacancy rate was 3.0%. 926 people (67.5% of the population) lived in owner-occupied housing units and 445 people (32.5%) lived in rental housing units.

== Economy ==
The local economy is a mixture of dairies and ranching, agricultural support, retail and services. On July 18, 2013, the California Employment Development Department identified Ferndale as having the second lowest unemployment rate (1.7%) of all cities in the state, led only by Carmel-by-the-Sea.

== Arts and culture ==
=== Tourism ===
Ferndale, sometimes also referred to as "Cream City", is known for well-preserved Victorian storefronts on Main Street and homes throughout the community, which are also known as "Butterfat Palaces," due to their construction wherein considerable wealth was generated in the dairy industry. Many of these buildings date from the 1880s. The entire town is registered as California Historical Landmark #883.

Six historic buildings as well as the Ferndale Main Street Historic District and the Fern Cottage Historic District are within or around Ferndale and are listed on the National Register of Historic Places.

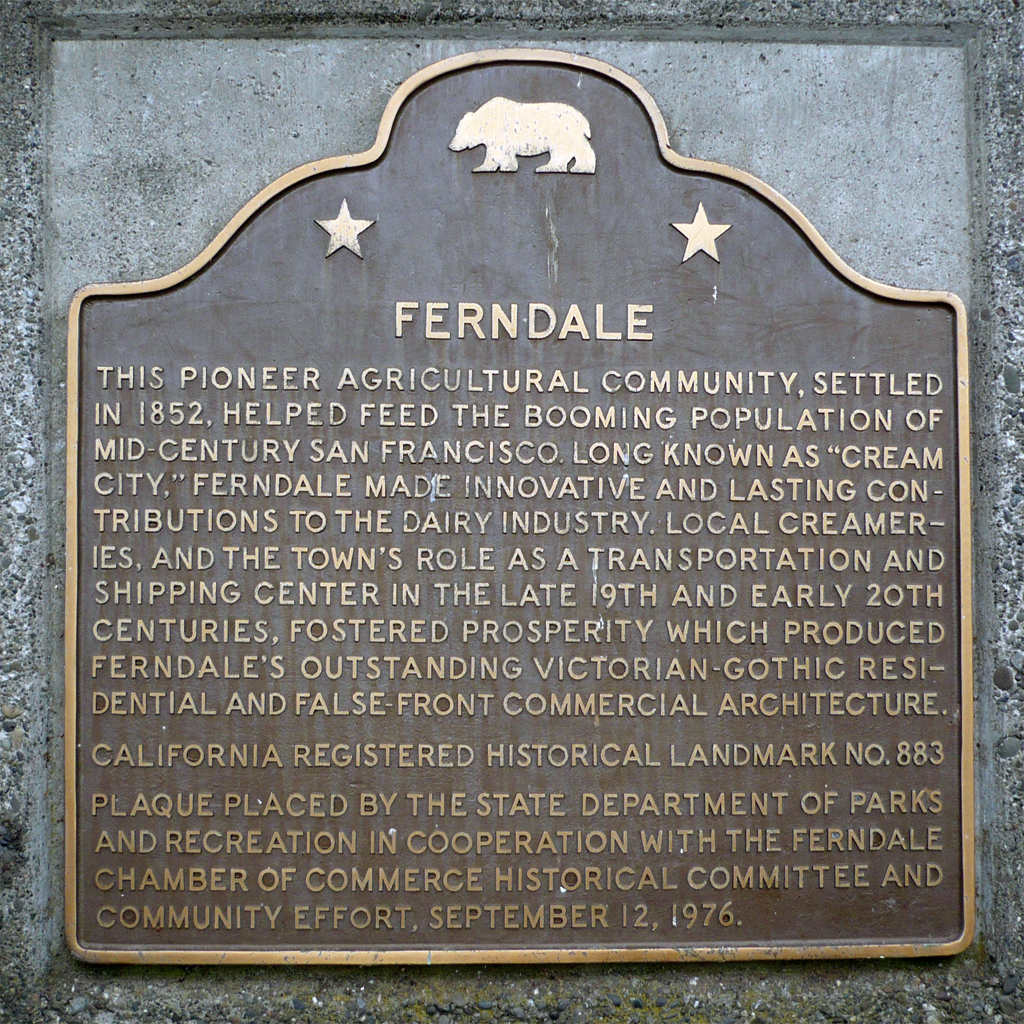
Landmark #883 plaque in Town Hall Park

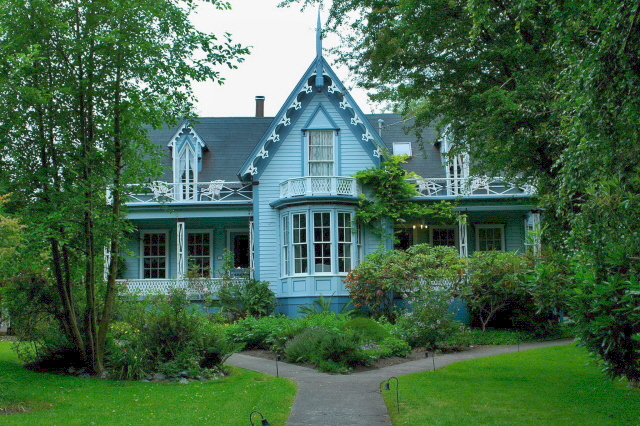
Shaw House

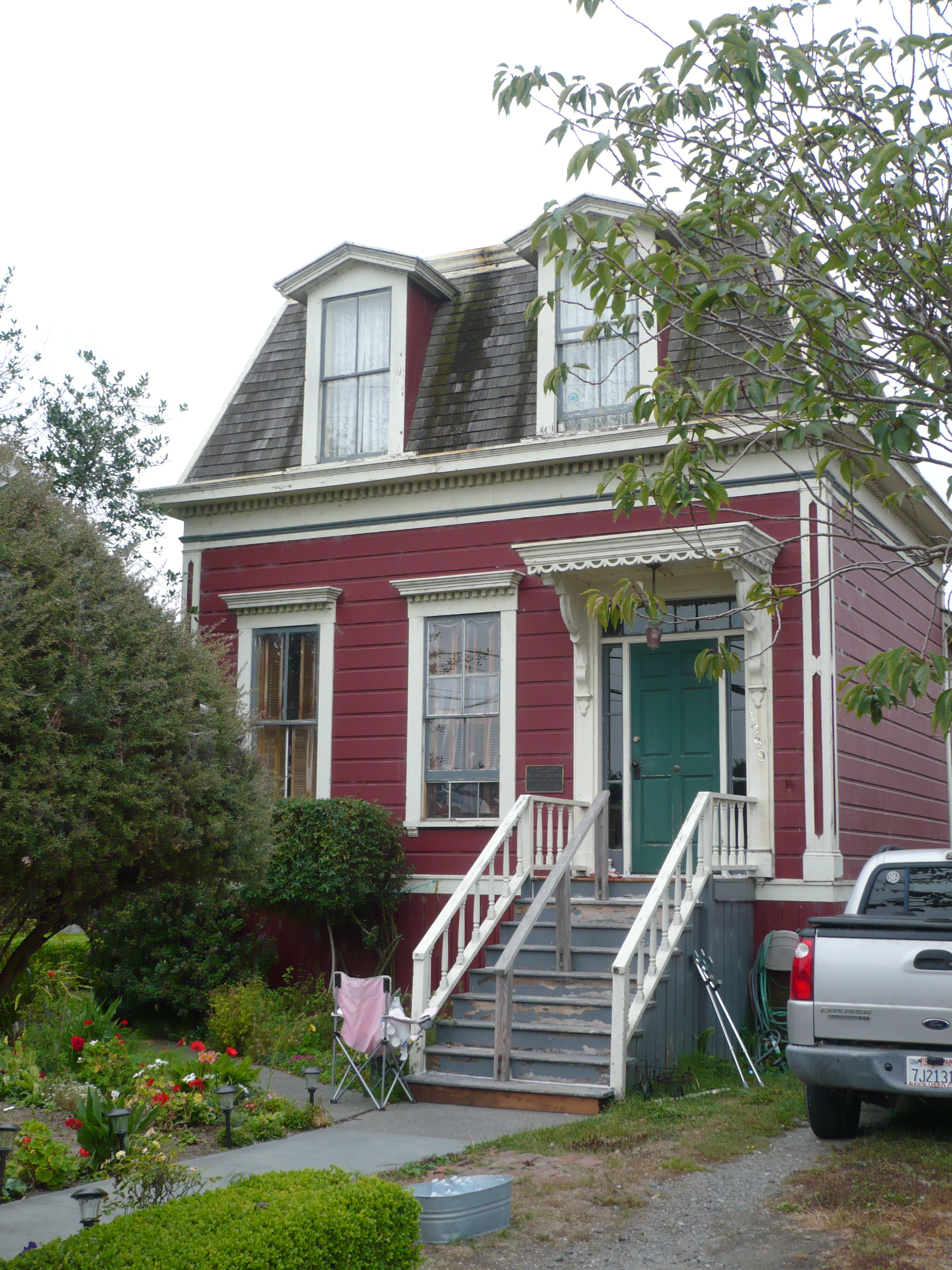
Alford–Nielson House

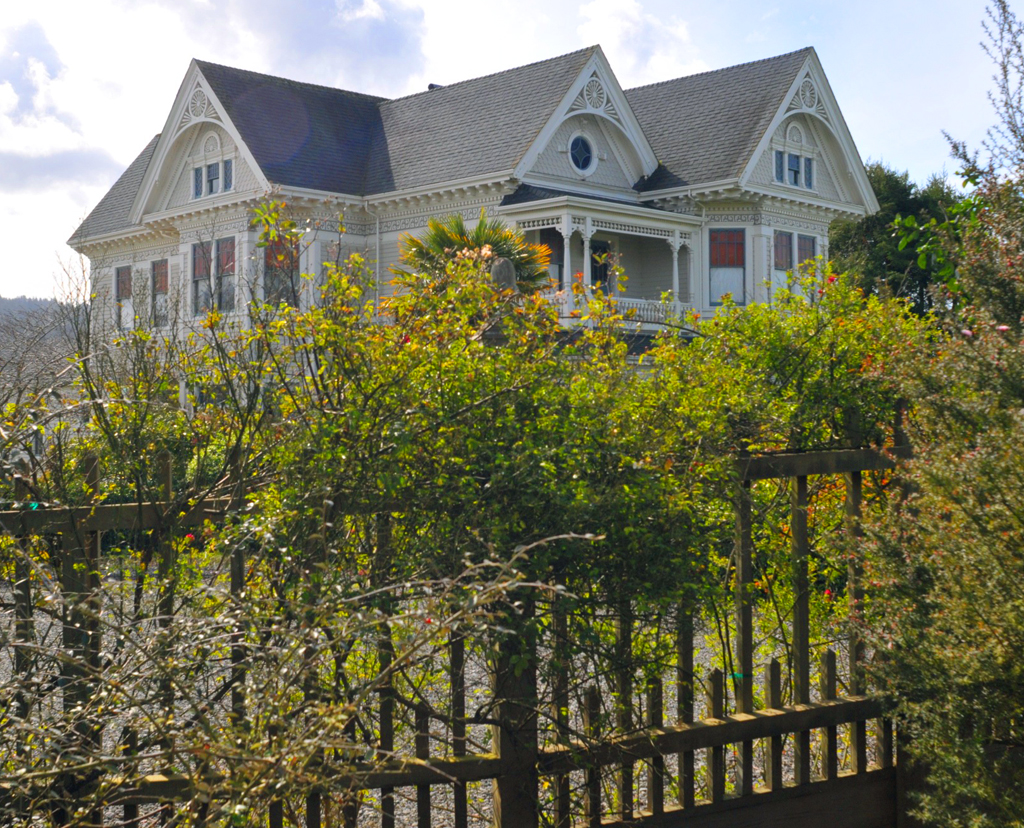
Andreasen–Rossen House

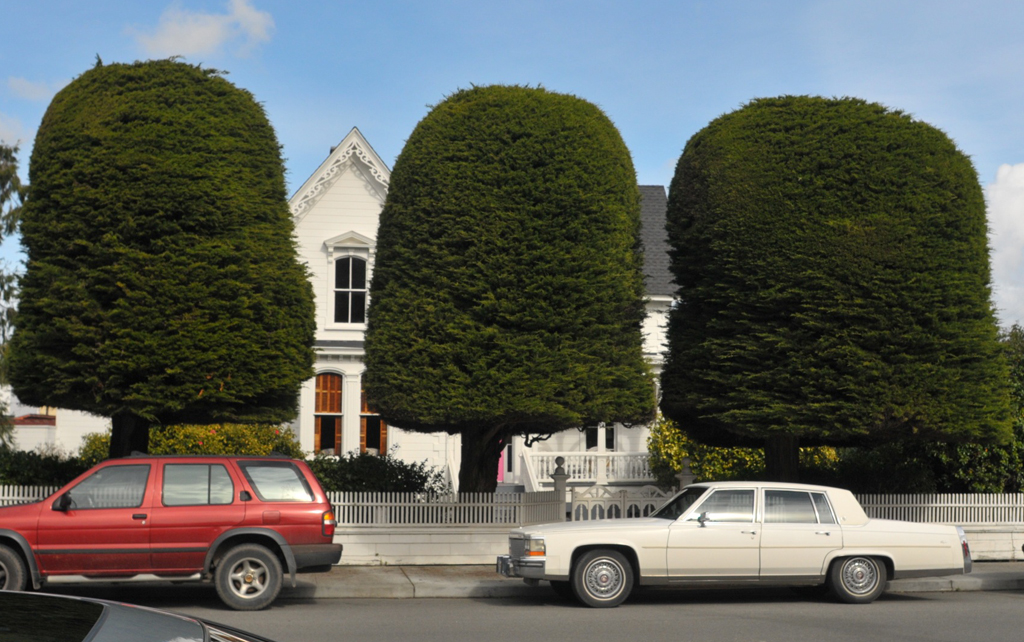
A. Berding House, "Gum Drop Tree House"

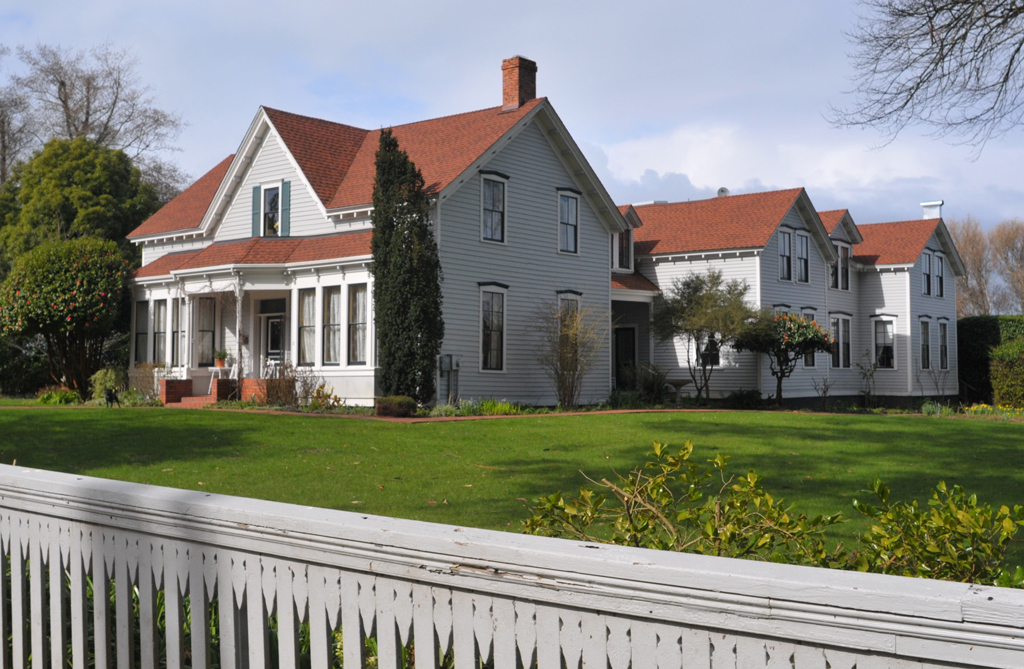
Fern Cottage (California) Historical District

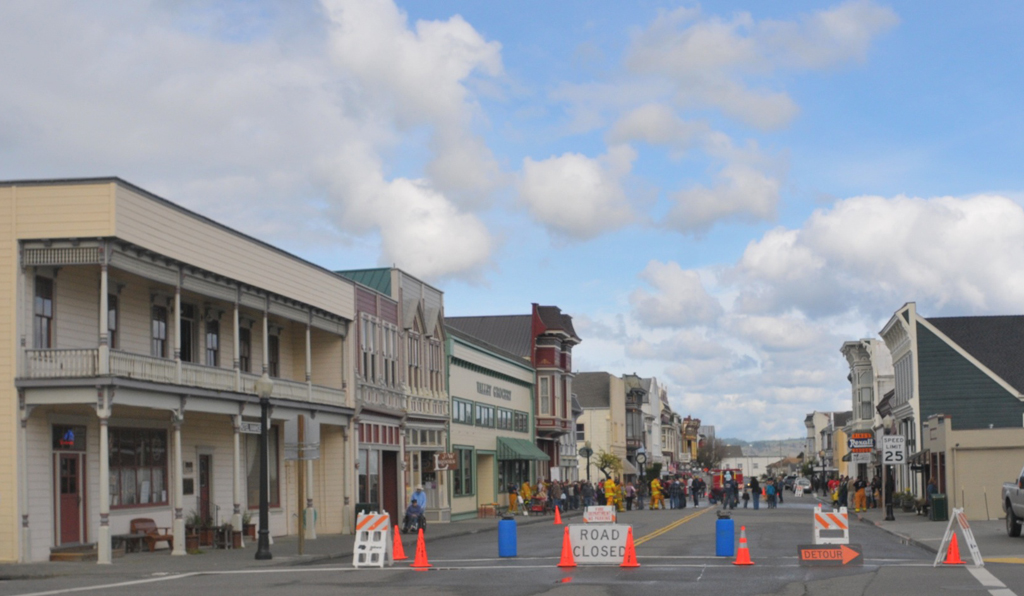
Main Street Historical District

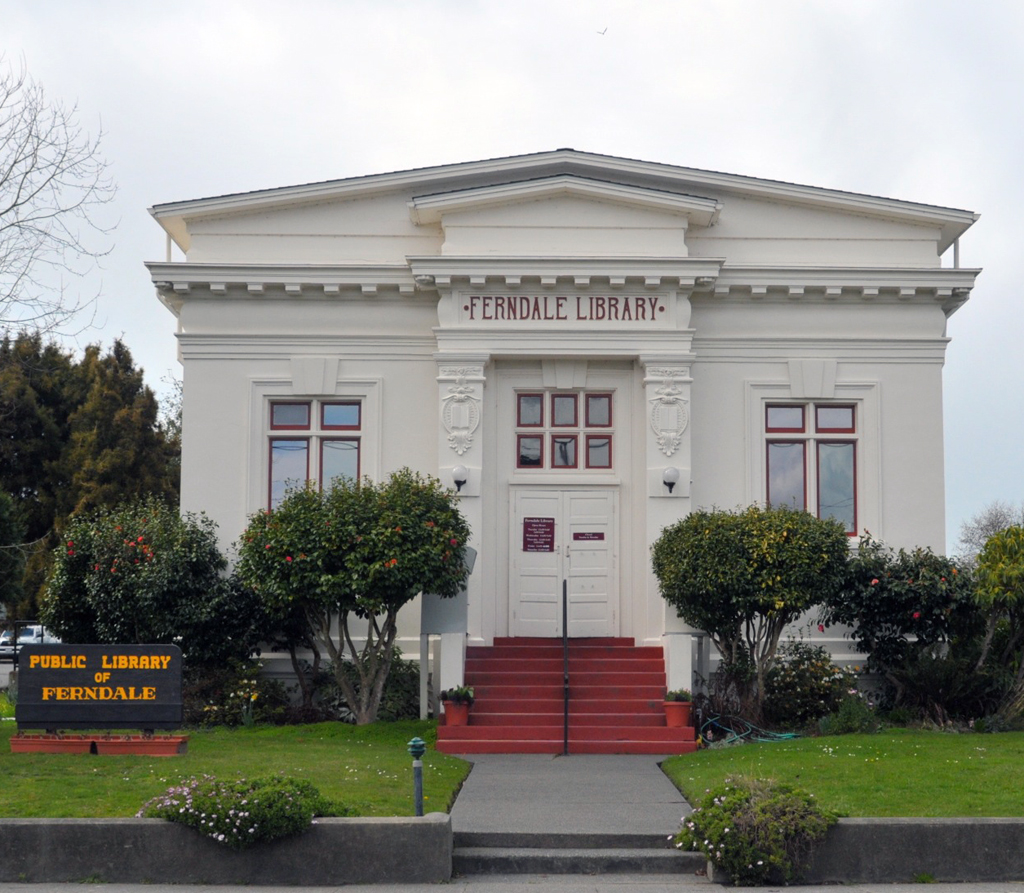
Ferndale Public Library

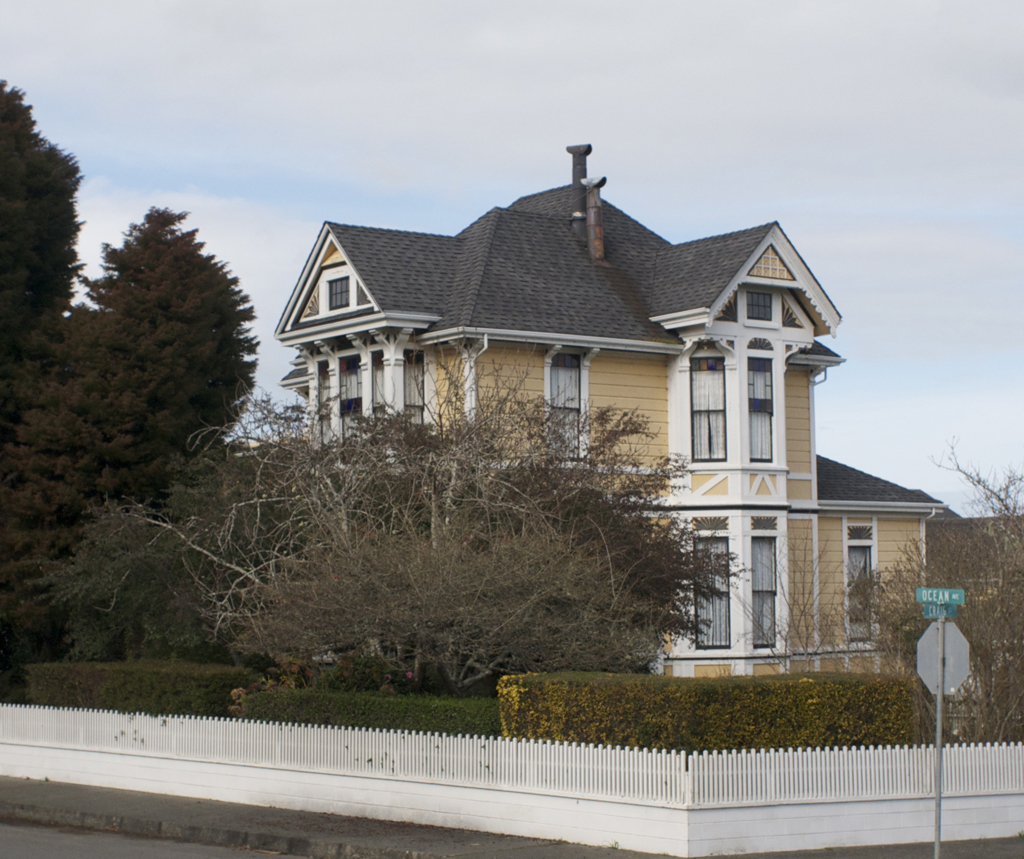
Rectory, Catholic Church of the Assumption, now a private home

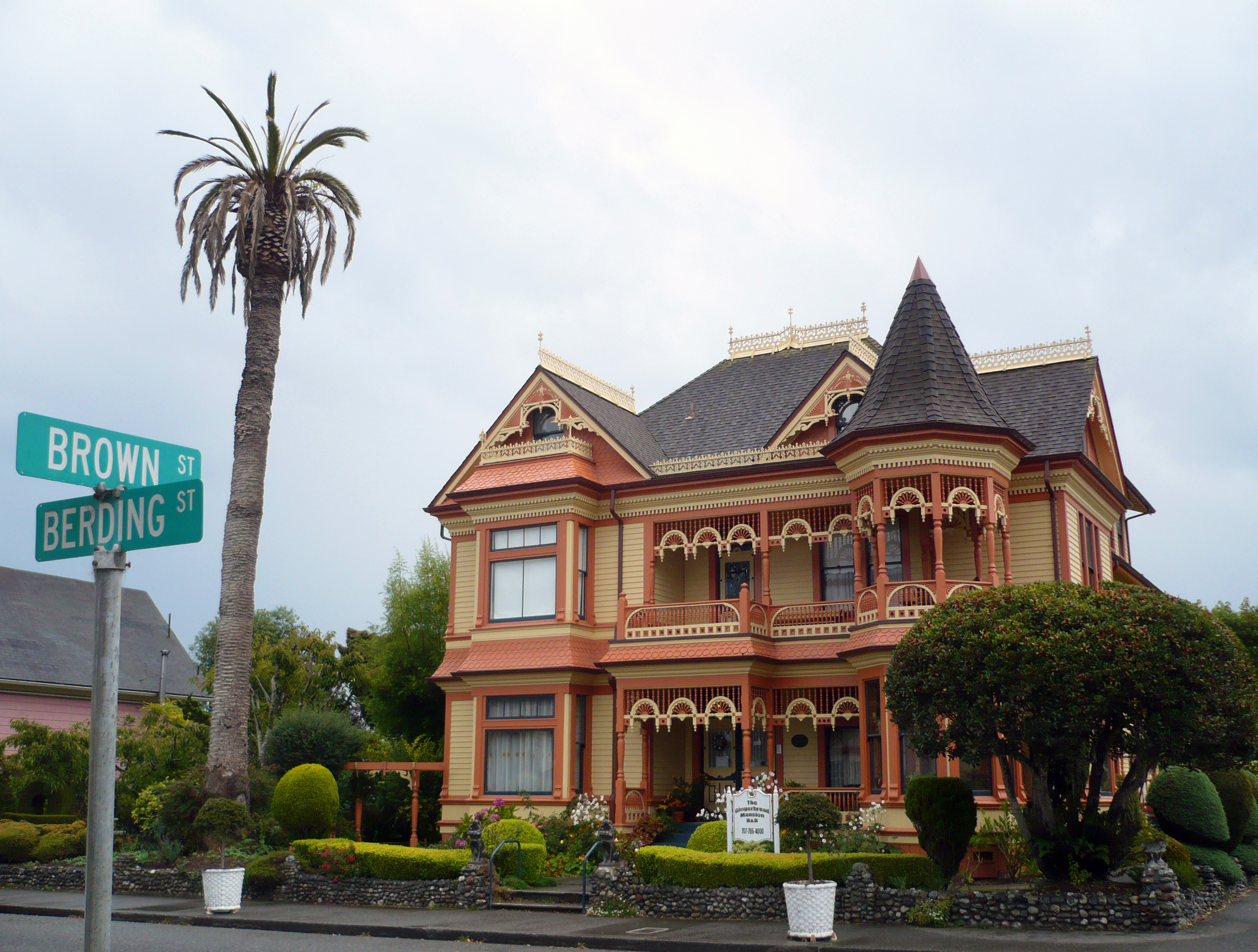
Gingerbread Mansion in 2014

Other points of interest include the Ferndale City Hall, Ferndale Museum, Ferndale Cemetery, St. Mary's Cemetery, Our Savior's Lutheran Church, Saint Mark's Lutheran Church, Church of the Assumption, the Congregational Church (now the Community Church), and the Humboldt County Fairgrounds.

=== Annual events ===
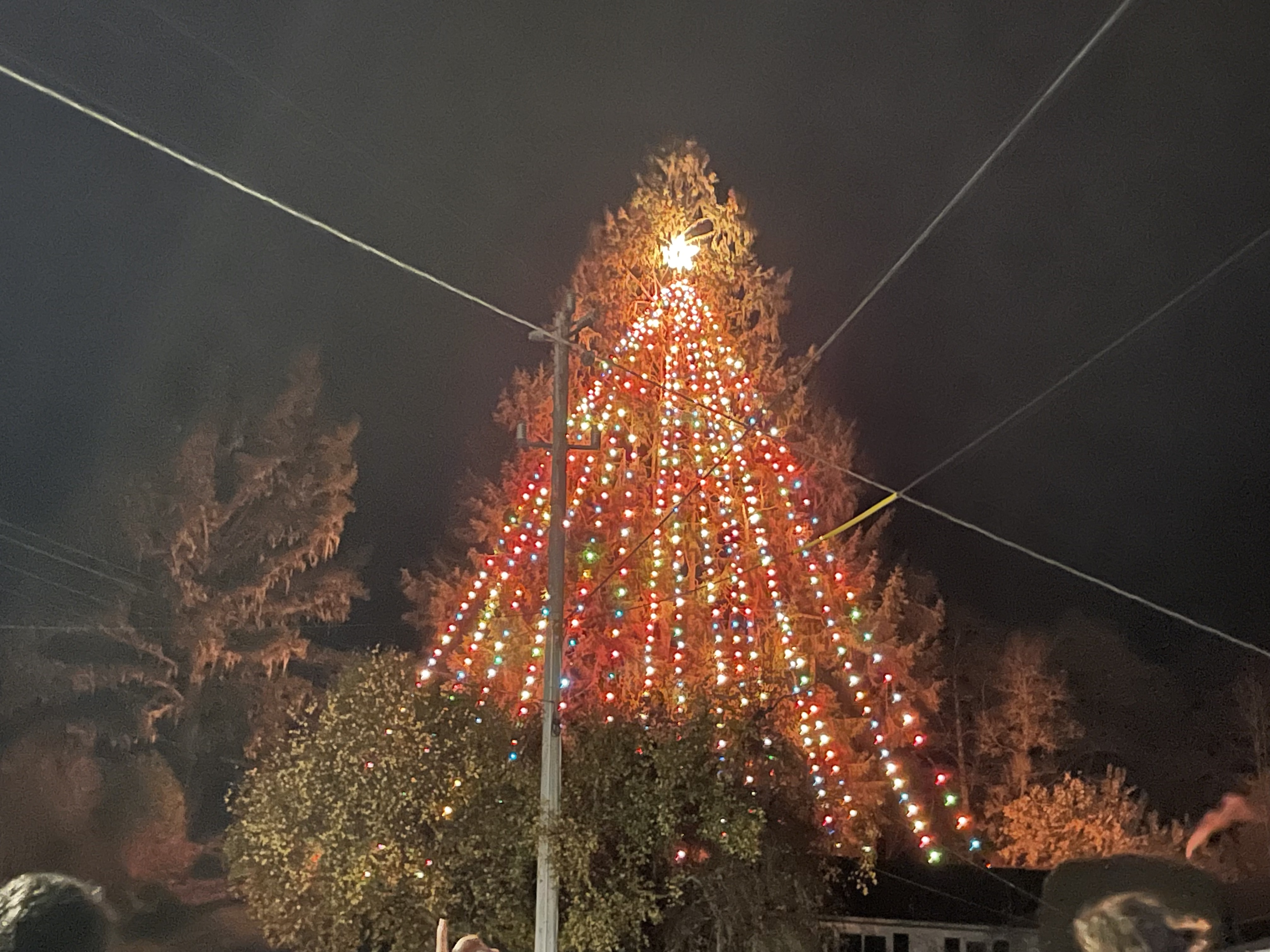
The tallest living Christmas tree in the country lit in 2021

The Humboldt County Fair has been held every August since 1896 at the county fairgrounds on the edge of Ferndale, and feature the only horse-racing events in the county along with agricultural, pastoral and artistic contests, carnival games, carnival amusement rides, and commercial and nonprofit booths.

Every year since 1934 in early December, local volunteer firefighters climb and light one of America's tallest living Christmas trees, an approximately 150-foot (46 m) spruce, during a celebration of song held at Fireman's Park.

The Ferndale Lighted Tractor Parade has been held every mid-December since 1993.

The Fray In Ferndale, a slot car race with the highest attendance of this type of event anywhere in the world has been held since 1997. More than 100 racers on sixteen teams arrive to compete on eight custom-built tables.

The Foggy Bottom Milk Run has been held (excluding two years for COVID) each March since 1977. Races were held in 2-mile (3.2 km), 4-mile (6.4 km), and 10-mile (16 km) distances. Beginning in 2024, only the 2-and-4-mile (3.2 and 6.4 km) will be run.

The Kinetic sculpture race has finished each May since 1969 in front of 393 Main Street. The race began in Ferndale when Hobart Brown was challenged to race his odd-looking five-wheeled bike down Main Street on Mother's Day that year by local sculptor Jack Mays. Multiple races were held in the first few years, but standardized on the current 42-mile (68 km) course in the late 1970s.

== Parks and recreation ==
=== City Hall Park ===
City Hall Park was deeded to the city by the Village Club in 1918. The triangular park was filled with material graded from the southern end of Main Street, and a Clubhouse (now City Hall) was finished in 1931. The building was styled to look like an English cottage. The fireplace was sent from England as a gift from the daughter of a resident. Its granite comes from a Welsh quarry and was chiseled in San Francisco. The Gazebo, which contains Ferndale's California Historical Landmark Plaque, is at the north end of City Hall Park. In 2011 new benches and trees were added to the park.

=== Firemen's Park ===
Firemen's Park at the southernmost end of town between Francis and Berding Streets is bordered on three sides by houses and to the south by restricted watershed property. It has ball fields, a playground, picnic area and three bocce courts. The Community Center in Fireman's Park was built in 1922. It includes a large dance and meeting pavilion with attached kitchen. The Ferndale Children's Center has occupied part of the pavilion since 1991.

=== Hadley Gardens ===
Located at 655 Main Street, next to the Shaw House, the creekside gardens include a replica dollhouse, native flora, a waterfall, and a "hobbit house".

=== Russ Park ===
Russ Park, located three blocks east of Main Street on Bluff Street, is open sunrise to sunset. Several hiking trails cross the mature forest in the 105-acre (42 ha) park donated to the city by Zipporah Patrick Russ on October 31, 1920. The deed includes "That the property be used forever as a park and recreation grounds … as a refuge and breeding place for birds." Dominant trees include Sitka spruce and Douglas fir with a few redwoods, blue gum eucalyptus, and other tree species. More than 100 kinds of birds are known from the park, which is the southern extent of the Pacific Northwest temperate rainforest.

== Government ==
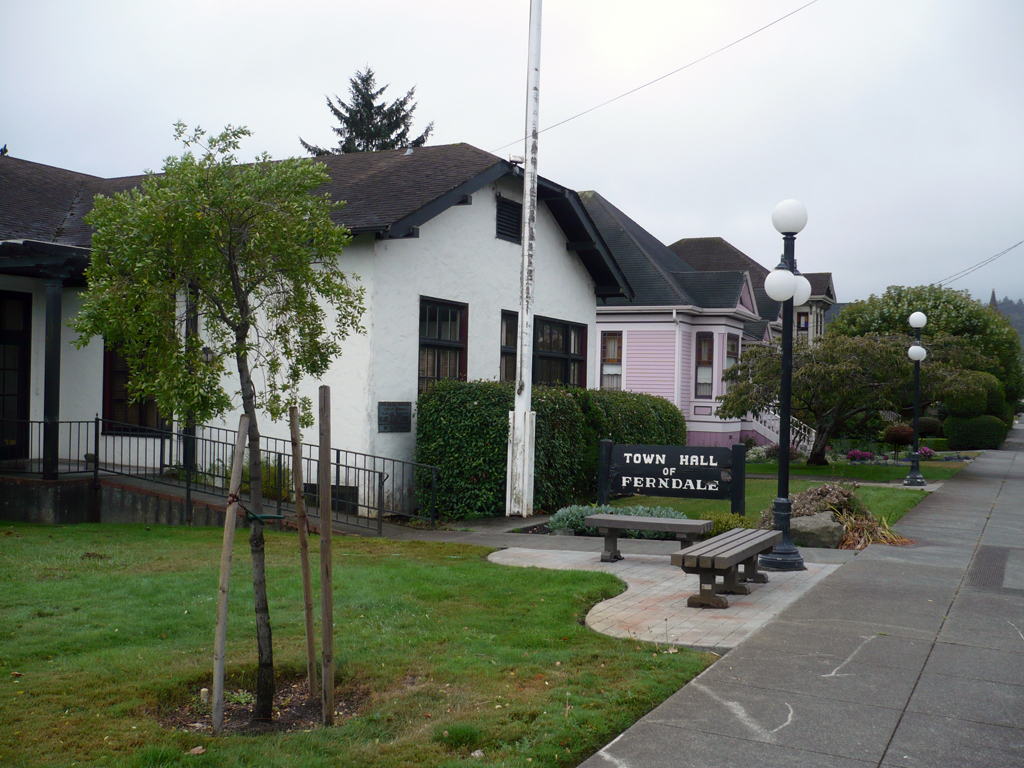
Ferndale Town Hall

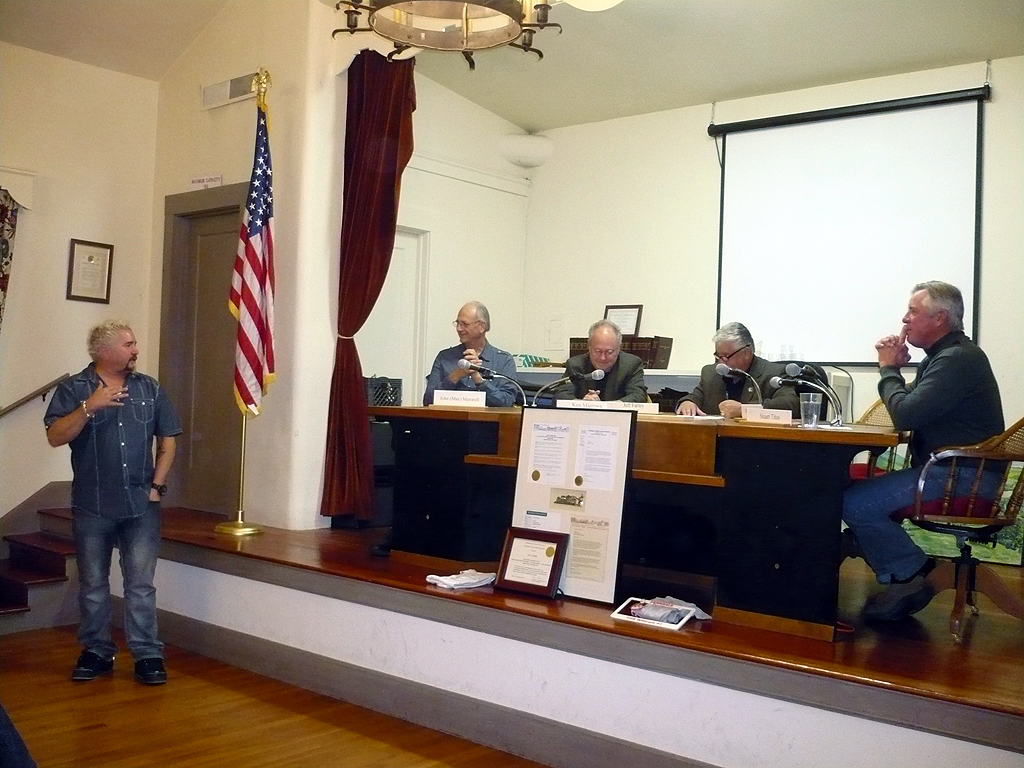
Guy Fieri receives the key to the city of Ferndale from the Ferndale City Council at a special council meeting, November 23, 2012.

=== Local ===
Ferndale was incorporated in 1893 and is governed by a four-member City Council and a Mayor, all of whom serve four-year terms chosen in the general election of even-numbered years.

In 2004 the City Council placed Measure O on the municipal ballot to eliminate the elective office of Mayor, instead proposing to appoint the position by a vote of the City Council from the council members. The measure was defeated with 78.8% voting against. When the Mayor's seat was next open for election in 2006, all of the mayoral candidates were write-ins.

=== State and federal ===
In the state legislature, Ferndale is in the 2nd senatorial district, represented by Democrat Mike McGuire, and the 2nd Assembly district, represented by Democrat Chris Rogers.

Federally, Ferndale is in California's 2nd congressional district, represented by Democrat Jared Huffman.

== Education ==
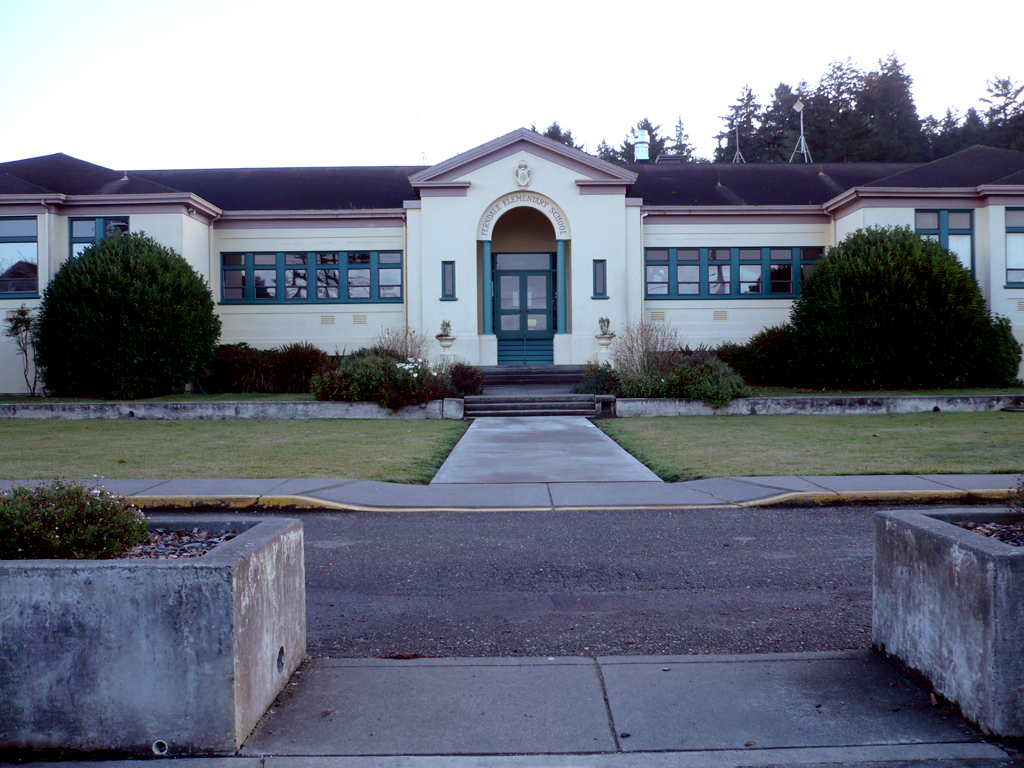
Ferndale Elementary School

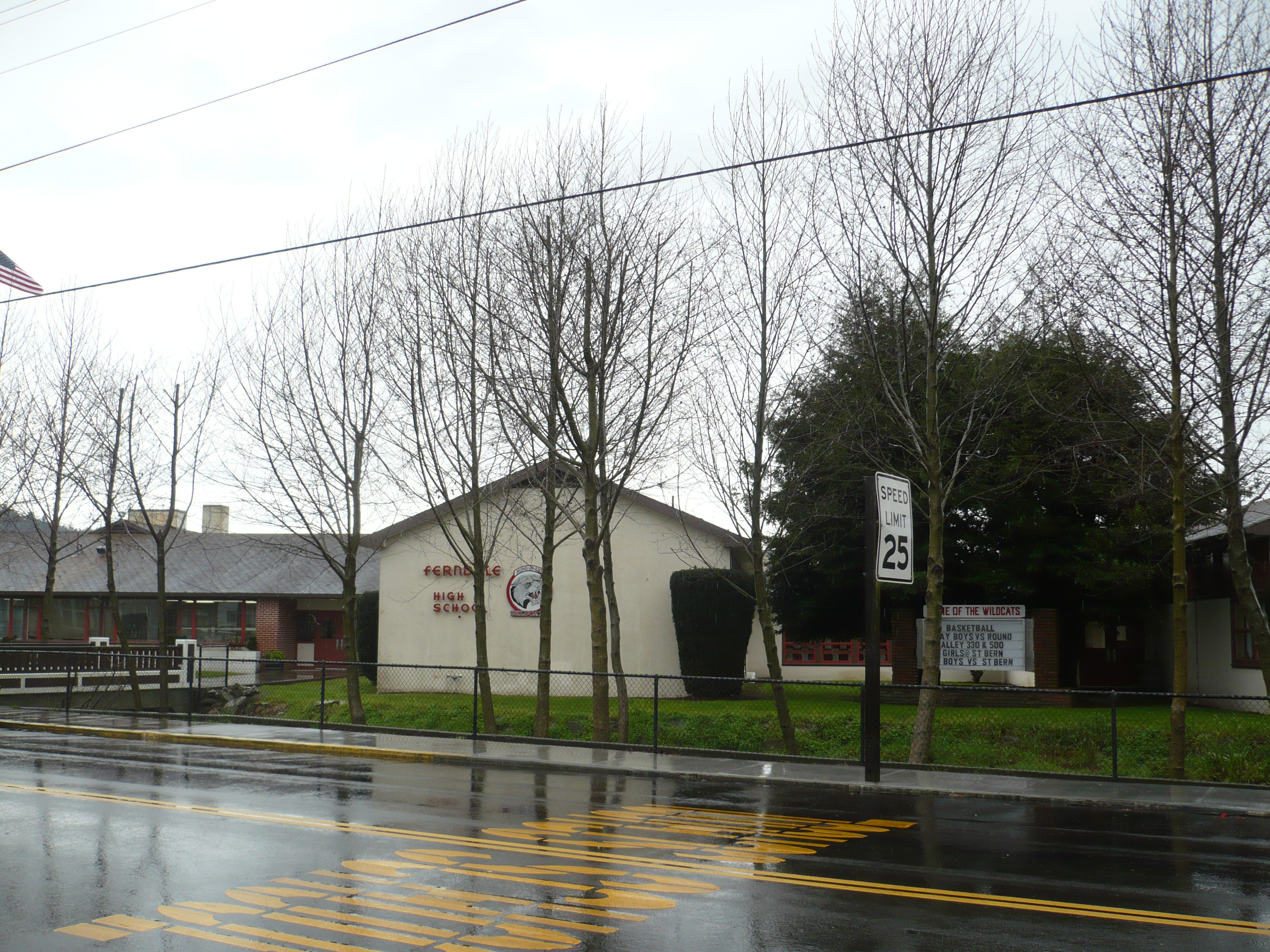
Ferndale High School

The Ferndale Unified School District has two schools, Ferndale Elementary School with grades K–8 and Ferndale High School with grades 9-12. The elementary school is the older of the two, dating back to the 1860s with school rooms and houses in various locations. In 1890, school trustees started a new building, but it—and the old building—were completely destroyed in an arson fire before it was finished. A replacement three-story, redwood Greek Revival building was built after the September fire and in time to open in February 1891. The stucco one-story building which currently houses the Ferndale Elementary School was built in 1924. The baby-boom of the 1960s resulted in classes at the Fairgrounds as well as the addition of four modular classrooms (since removed), and the construction of a gymnasium in 1967. The following year, the closure of the Assumption Catholic School (1915–1968) rapidly increased enrollment as 117 students transferred and the rising enrollment resulted in the addition of five primary classrooms and a playground. In 1976 the building was earthquake retrofitted.

The high school was founded in 1904 by the unification of smaller school districts across the Eel River Valley, including Port Kenyon, Island School, Grant School, Salt River School, Coffee Creek School, Grizzly Bluff School, and Pleasant Point School. The original building was in use from 1907 to 1951 when it was replaced by the present high school facility.

Ferndale High School has an active sports program, offering softball, volleyball, wrestling, baseball, tennis, basketball, track and field, golf, soccer, and football. Ferndale won its 14th California football sectional title and the California Interscholastic Federation Division 7-AA football championship in 2023. The girls' soccer team won the California North Coast Section championship in 2023.

The school has a long-time sports rivalry with neighboring Fortuna Union High School. The first Ferndale Wildcat versus Fortuna Huskies "Milk Can" football game was played in 1945 and each year since with approximately 20 years hiatus. In 2011, the Milk Can was stolen from Ferndale High School during a break-in by three Fortuna High School students, thrown over a bluff, and later recovered by police.

Since 1998, the Ferndale Repertory Theatre has offered The Marilyn McCormick Performing Arts Scholarship to local high school seniors. Sara Bareilles was the first recipient of the scholarship.

== Media ==
Ferndale is home to the oldest newspaper under a single name in Humboldt County, The Ferndale Enterprise. Commercial radio station KHUM operates in a joint studio with KLGE, KSLG-FM and KWPT. Ferndale is also home to the North Coast's oldest theatre company, The Ferndale Repertory Theatre which has been in operation since 1972.

== Infrastructure ==
=== Affordable housing ===
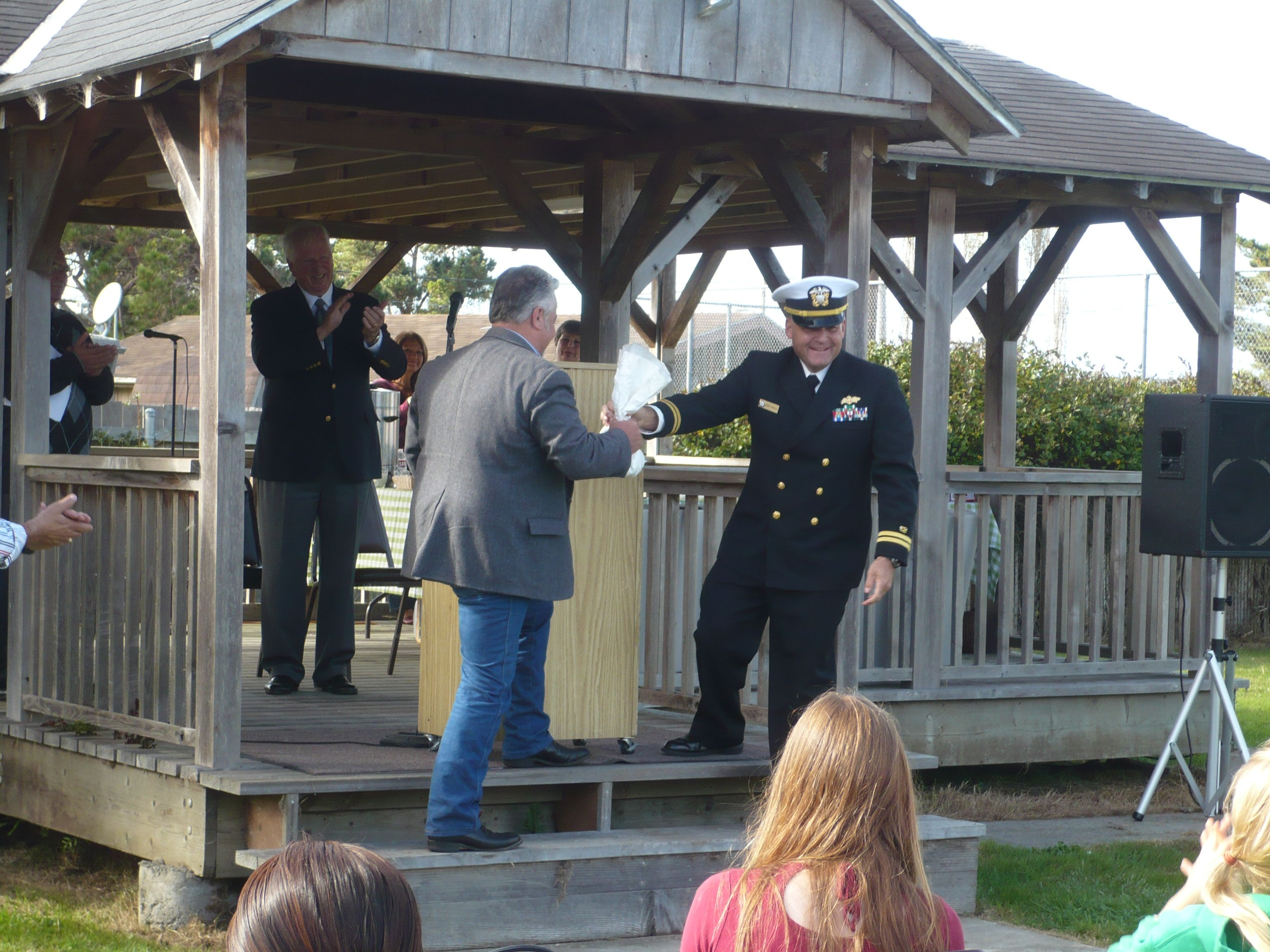
Lt. Jeremy M. Schwartz hands the keys of surplus U.S. Navy Housing to Mayor Jeff Farley at the Navy Housing Picnic Shelter in Ferndale, California, on October 23, 2011.

U.S. Navy Housing was built for staff of the 37-acre Naval Facility (NAVFAC) Centerville Beach, Centerville, California which was commissioned on March 25, 1958. Originally the base was staffed by 95 people, but grew to over 280 people. The 52-unit Ferndale Navy Housing was built as part of this project. The NAVFAC was decommissioned on September 30, 1993.

The U.S. Coast Guard subsequently occupied the Navy Housing but vacated the housing units in October 2008. The property was returned to the Navy which declared the units surplus. In order to acquire the housing, a ballot initiative was required. The city placed Measure S on the ballot for the November 2, 2010, election. Measure S passed 516 (74.57%) to 176 (25.43%) approving the city's plan to acquire low- and moderate-income housing from the Navy.

The Ferndale City Council voted to purchase the housing from the Navy for $1.00 on September 1, 2011. The city began negotiations with the nonprofit O'Rourke Foundation, part of the Bertha Russ Lytel Foundation, to take over and run the 52-unit project as an affordable housing project. The Navy housing is ten percent of the available housing in the city. The 24 single-family homes, 14 duplex townhouses, three playgrounds and two community buildings of the former Navy Housing were transferred from the Navy to the city in a public ceremony with Congressman Mike Thompson on October 23, 2011.

=== Drinking water ===
The Ferndale water system was installed by Mr. Francis Francis in 1872. In 1906, the Francis Land and Water Company was incorporated and in 1910 they bought the Cold Springs Water Company which supplied eastern Ferndale. In 1954, the Citizens Utilities Company bought the system from the Francis Estate and sold it to Del Oro Water Company in 1996.

Ferndale's spring water comes from 28 individual springs which produce 113 US gallons (430 L; 94 imp gal) per minute. Historic tunnels under a hillside and a million gallon underwater reservoir collect and store water before distribution. As a secondary source of supply, water may also come from the Van Ness Treatment Plant which can supply an average of nearly 30 gallons per minute. The Del Oro Water Company finished the Ferndale Mainline Replacement Project in 2011 which included larger pipes and new valves to reduce the number of customers affected during line repairs.

=== Wastewater treatment ===
Ferndale's first sewage treatment facility and combined sewer system was built in 1953 and upgraded in 1973, 1994 and 2001. Improvements were made to the sewers in 1989 under a $400,000 project funded by the California State Water Resources Control Board to improve the collection system and reduce inflow and infiltration.

El Niño storms in April 1998 caused Williams Creek to change course due to debris blockage. Williams Creek had been the major tributary of the Salt River near the treatment plant, so diversion lowered the volume of water available and caused the dilution ratios at the plant to exceed permitted levels. Record storm water flows also damaged the plant and the city applied for financial assistance under the FEMA-1203-DR-CA El Niño storm Presidential disaster declaration. On May 15, 2003, the Regional Water Board (RWB) placed a Cease and Desist order on Ferndale due to discharges of treated wastewater which exceeded one percent of the flow of Francis Creek / Salt River stream system. The city paid a $48,000 penalty to the RWB and agreed to complete an environmental project instead of paying $78,000 more in penalties to the RWB and began replacing the old plant in 2009.

The new wastewater plant was completed in 2011 and provides tertiary treatment for nearly 1,500 commercial and residential users. The only other wastewater facility like Ferndale's in California is in Colfax.

== Notable people ==
- Jack Bear — costume designer and Academy Award nominee
- Hobart Brown — artist
- Peter Buckley — Oregon State Representative
- Len Casanova — athlete and coach
- Bobby Clark — actor
- Donald Clausen — Congressman
- Sam Dungan — professional baseball player
- Cornelius Van Hemert Engert — United States diplomat who served in Ethiopia, Iran, and Afghanistan
- Albert Etter — plant breeder best known for his work on strawberry and apple varieties
- Frank Ferguson — character actor
- Guy Fieri — chef, restaurateur and Food Network star
- Seth Kinman — pioneer
- Thomas E. Leavey — businessman
- Rob Nairne — linebacker National Football League
- Elaine "Spanky" McFarlane — musician
- Joe Oeschger — major league baseball pitcher
- Stephen W. Shaw — pioneer artist
- Sally Tanner — Representative, California State Assembly
- Edward L. Wilson — civil engineer

== In popular culture ==
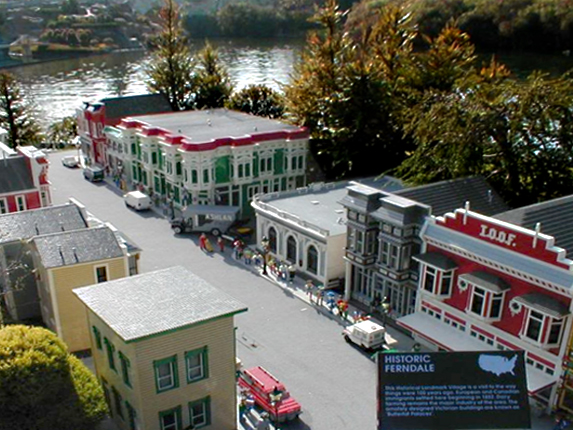
Some of Ferndale's historic buildings at Legoland California. Left to right top: Abraxas Building, Victorian Inn, NVB Bank Building, Hobart Galleries, and the IOOF hall. The order of the buildings is not the same as in reality.

=== Filming location ===
Ferndale has been featured in such movies as The Majestic and Outbreak. It has appeared in such made-for-television movies as Salem’s Lot, A Death in Canaan, and Joe Dirt. It was also the location of the iconic “I'm a Pepper” commercial for Dr. Pepper.

Ferndale was also featured by Huell Howser in Road Trip Episode 149, the science fiction horror cult film She Demons (1958), the award-winning short film Nonnie & Alex (1995), and the comedy-drama Kingdom Come (2001).

=== Legoland model replica ===
Many of Ferndale's buildings have been recreated at the Legoland California theme park, as the only American small town to be represented alongside New York, San Francisco, Las Vegas and other nationally known locations. Ferndale was settled by many Danes, and Lego is a Danish company. In 1995, Legoland staff took hundreds of photos in Ferndale, and used over one million Lego bricks to recreate the town in the Miniland section of the park.

== See also ==
- California State Route 211
- Centerville Beach Cross
- Eel River
- Fernbridge
- Ferndale Museum
