= F. W. Andreasen–John Rossen House =

Historic house near Ferndale, California, United States

- U.S. National Register of Historic Places
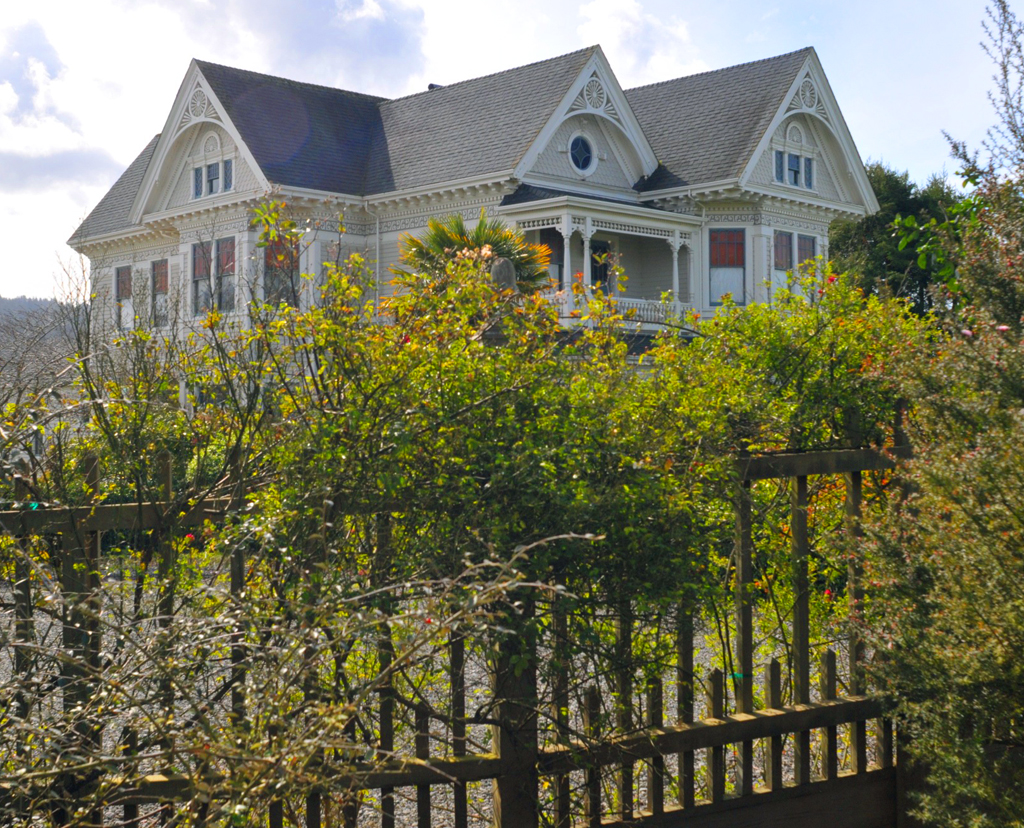
- The historic home is protected from Pacific storms by a dense windbreak.

- Location within California Location within the United States
- Location: Port Kenyon Road and Bush Street, Ferndale, California
- Coordinates: 40°35′38″N 124°16′21″W
- Built: 1901
- Built by: William S. Fitzell
- Architect: William S. Fitzell
- Architectural style: Queen Anne
- NRHP reference No.: 89000855
- Added to NRHP: 25 September 1989

The Andreasen–Rossen House includes a two hundred acre historic district located near Ferndale, California.

== History ==
Designed by architect builder William S. Fitzell, the Andreasen–Rossen House was completed for Frands Wilhelm Andreasen in 1901. While called his "Skim Milk House" for Andreasen's thrifty habit of getting skim milk from other dairies to feed to his hogs, he also ran a creamery and dairy of his own. In 1901, he and his family moved to Berkeley, California after he was appointed to the California State Dairy Bureau.

In 1901, Andreasen sold the house to the Rossen family who lived there until 1988. New owners repaired and refinished original woodwork and rewired all the original lighting fixtures; for a time opening it for tours to the public. The house was added to the National Register of Historic Places on 25 September 1989. Since 1991, it has been a private residence.
