= Grizzly Bluff School =

- U.S. National Register of Historic Places
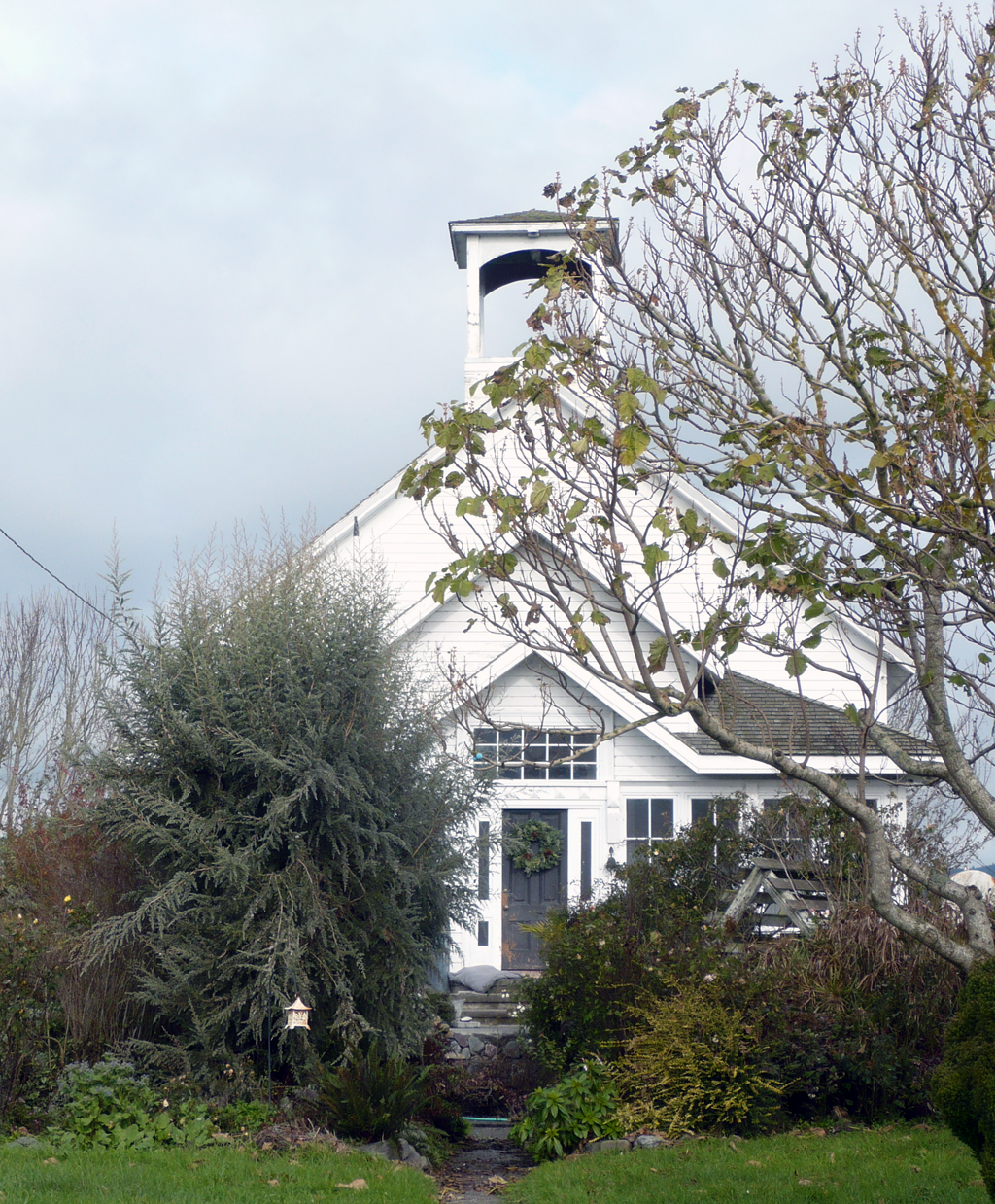
- Grizzly Bluff School in 2012

- Location within California Location within the United States
- Location: Grizzly Bluff Road & East Ferry Road, California, United States
- Coordinates: 40°33′46″N 124°10′18″W
- Built: 1871
- Architect: John Davenport & Tom Dix
- Architectural style: Greek Revival
- NRHP reference No.: 79000476
- Added to NRHP: 1979

The Grizzly Bluff School was an historic school in the farm fields outside Ferndale, California. Students came from the surrounding Eel River valley to attend a one-room school earlier than the construction of the first known school building.

Tom Dix and John Davenport built the current building in 1871, and the ornamental windbreak was planted in 1878. In the 1880s, the building was moved away from the road and placed on a new foundation.

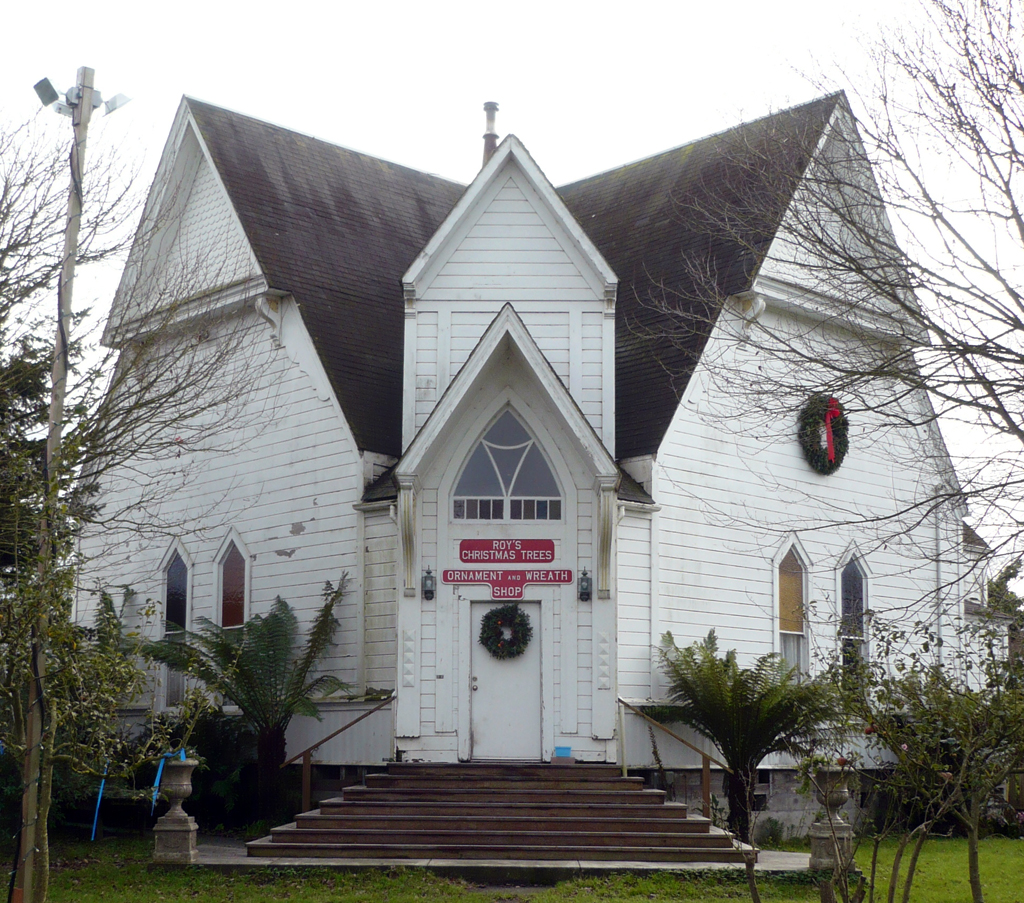
Old Presbyterian Church at Grizzly Bluff

In 1900, more space was needed to support a large number of students and the old Presbyterian Church nearby was converted to schoolrooms. By 1976, the school continued only grades one through four. Students from fifth grade attended Ferndale Elementary School. Grizzly Bluff School closed its doors for the last time on 30 June 30, 1989.

== Sources ==
- Ferndale Union High School, Class of 1977 (1977). Carlson, Beverly (ed.). Where the ferns grew tall: An early history of Ferndale (1st ed.). Charleston, South Carolina: Ferndale Union High School. p. 379. 0-7385-2890-0.
- National Register Information System (April 15, 2008). "National Register of Historic Places". National Park Service. Archived from the original on December 4, 2010.
- "California School Directory". California Department of Education.
