= Centerville, Humboldt County, California =

Former settlement in Humboldt County, California, United States

Centerville
- Former settlement
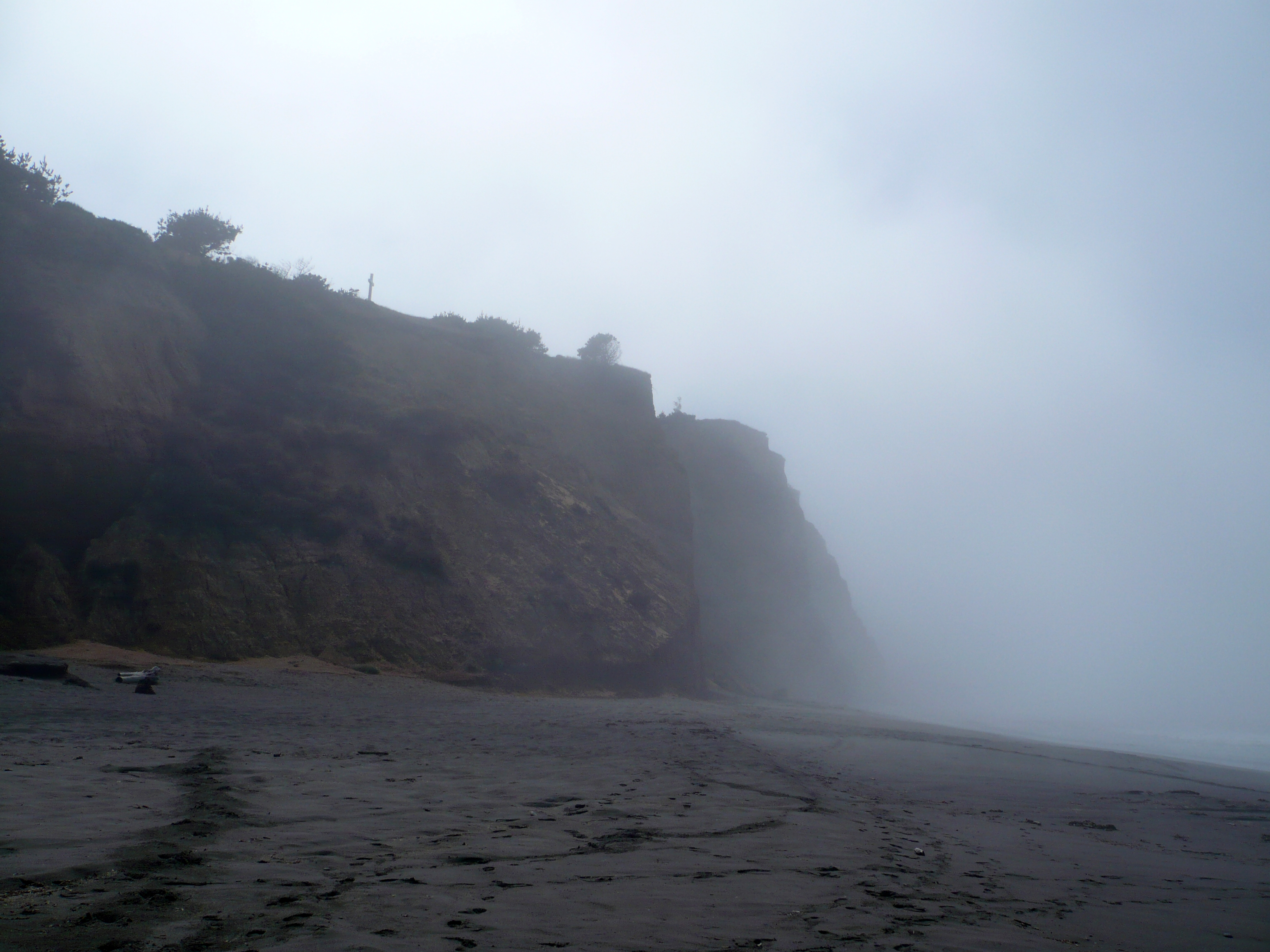
- Looking South along Centerville Beach
- Interactive map of Centerville
- Coordinates: 40°34′29″N 124°20′53″W
- Country: United States
- State: California
- County: Humboldt
- Elevation: 13 ft (4 m)
- Time zone: Pacific Standard Time
- Area code: 707

Centerville (formerly, Centerville City and Centerville Beach) is a former settlement in Humboldt County, California, United States. It was located 4.5 miles (7 km) west of Ferndale, on the Pacific Ocean at an elevation of 13 feet (4 m).

== History ==
Centerville was founded in 1852 and served as a trans-shipment point for oil from Petrolia to Eureka and was at its height during the 1850s to the 1870s.

In 1857 Arnold Berding, a native of Germany, arrived in Humboldt County and set up a store, hotel, livery and post office at the now-abandoned village of Centerville where Abraham Lincoln appointed him the first and only postmaster of the town.

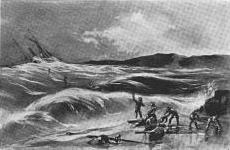
Survivors on shore watch others escape the wrecked steamship Northerner, January 6, 1860.

In January 1860, residents provided assistance and shelter to survivors of the wrecked steamship Northerner. Shortly after the victims were buried in a mass grave that is now marked by the Centerville Beach Cross, the wreck salvage was sold at auction at Berding's Centerville store.

The Centerville Beach Cross Historic Marker was erected in 1921, wrecked by the 1992 Cape Mendocino earthquakes but rebuilt and rededicated afterwards.

Centerville Beach is administered as a Humboldt County Park.

Historic artifacts and genealogical records of Centerville are maintained at the Ferndale Museum in Ferndale, California.
