= Rectory, Catholic Church of the Assumption =

Historic house in California, United States

- U.S. National Register of Historic Places
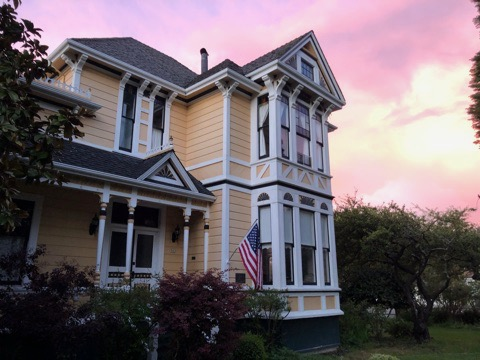
- Old Rectory, May 2020

- Location within California Location within the United States
- Location: 563 Ocean Ave., Ferndale, California
- Coordinates: 40°34′30″N 124°15′42″W
- Area: 0.62 acres (0.25 ha)
- Built: 1883
- Architect: Costerisa, George F.
- Architectural style: Eastlake Stick, Queen Anne
- NRHP reference No.: 82002183
- Added to NRHP: 11 February 1982

Rectory, Catholic Church of the Assumption is a historic former rectory built in 1883. It now stands at 563 Ocean Avenue in Ferndale, California and was added to the National Register of Historic Places in 1982.

== History ==
The first Catholic church in Ferndale was completed on 9 May 1879 and served until 1895 when it was moved from the corner of Washington and Berding streets to another lot on Washington. The new church was built at Washington and Berding streets by J. W. Blackmore, at a cost of $4,062.50 and dedicated on 16 August 1896.

In 1883 the first rectory was replaced with a second one on the site of the old one to the north of the church, facing Berding Street. In 1964, the congregation replaced the second rectory building with a third one, at a cost of $64,763.91. A descendant of one of Ferndale's pioneer families, Mrs. Viola Russ McBride, purchased the second rectory for $1.00 from Church authorities and had it moved to its present location at 563 Ocean Avenue.
