= Gingerbread Mansion =

Historic building in Ferndale, California

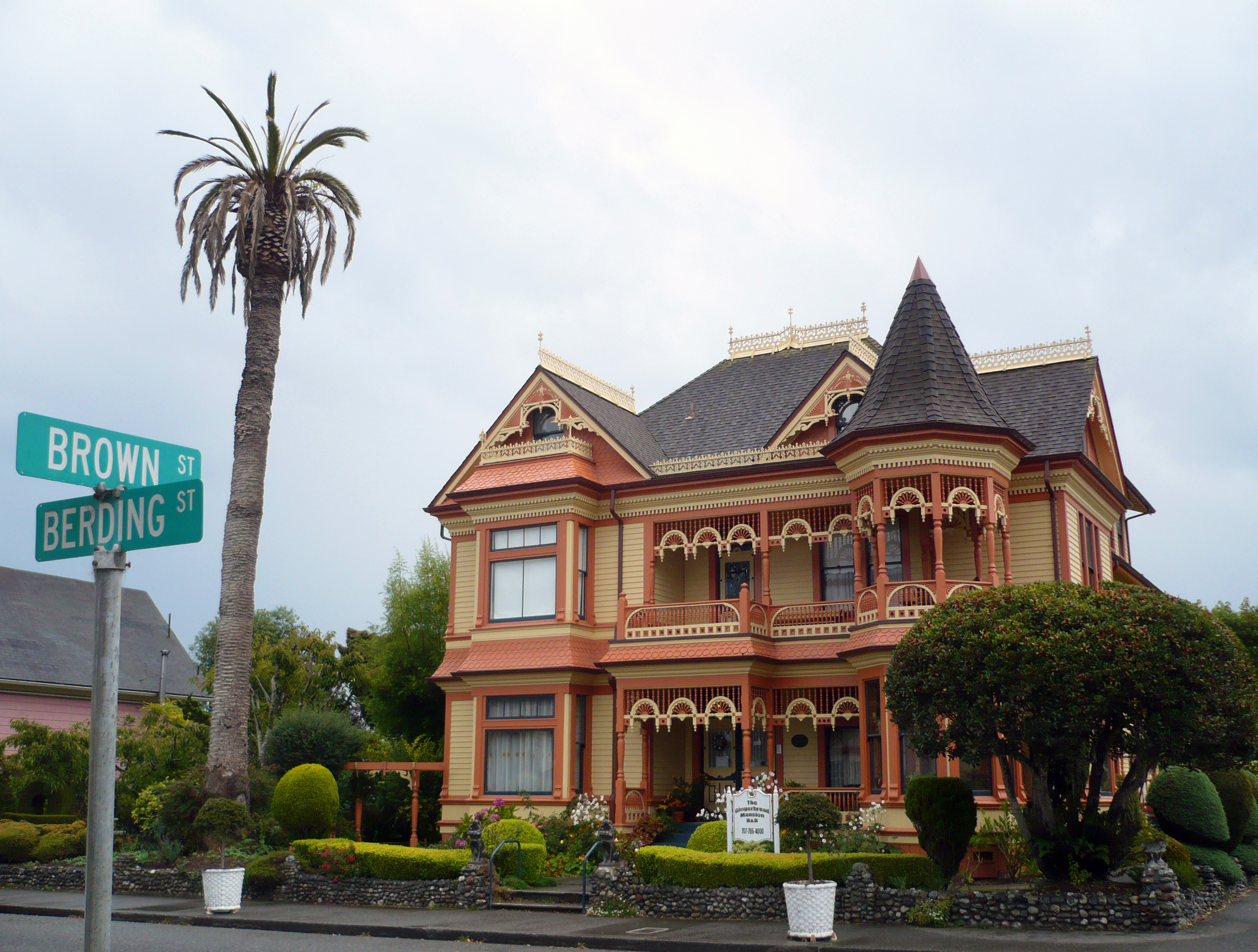
- Gingerbread Mansion, SW elevation
- Interactive map of the Gingerbread Mansion area

General information
- Architectural style: Queen Anne
- Location: 400 Berding Street, Ferndale, California, United States
- Coordinates: 40°34′32.5″N 124°15′45.14″W
- Construction started: 1899
- Completed: 1899
- Client: Hogan Ring, M.D.

Technical details
- Structural system: fir/redwood framing, redwood planking,
- Size: 10,000 square feet (930 m^{2})

Design and construction
- Main contractor: Carpenters John Kerri and Robert Kerri

Other information
- Parking: adjacent street parking

The Gingerbread Mansion, also known as the Ring Mansion, is a historic Queen Anne Victorian style house located at 400 Berding Street in Ferndale, Humboldt County, California. Historically it has served as the family home of medical doctor Hogan J. Ring (1851–1930), his office, a public hospital, American Legion hall, rest home, apartments, and a bed and breakfast inn.

== About ==
The Gingerbread Mansion is the largest residential building in Ferndale, with three floors, 32 rooms, 11 bedrooms, 9 bathrooms and extensive gardens in 1975 when it had been converted into apartments. In 2017, it had 11 bedrooms and 11.5 bathrooms and is a working bed-and-breakfast inn.

== History ==
Dr. Ring had a house, a barn, and a water tank house on the property prior to the construction of the mansion, which were moved to the Francis addition by John Morris house movers in April, 1899. The Ring Mansion was unusually well-built, even for its time, from the concrete foundation up to 2 feet (0.61 m) crawl spaces between floors. Built from redwood, as were many Ferndale residences, the Gingerbread Mansion also has 24 inches (61 cm) double wall construction and 18 inches (46 cm) square support members.

Ring's builders created a turreted, balconied, gabled, and crested Victorian with Queen Anne influences in the spindles and turnings which cover the Berding Street facade and continue partway down Brown Street. The exterior was fully fenced and had a concrete sidewalk built in 1899. The highly ornamented original portion of the home is in front, an addition in 1920 added the less decorated section at the rear to serve as the town hospital.

=== Hogan J. Ring and family ===
Hogan J. Ring was born Haagan J. Fjorkenstad, son of Jens and Helene Fjokenstad on February 17, 1851, on an estate in Norway named Ringtogen. His older brother Johannes settled in Minnesota at age 12, and at age 14 Haagan emigrated to the United States on a sailing ship named the Emerald to join him. The Fjorkenstad boys became the "Ring" brothers from their estate name because their Norwegian name was too hard to pronounce; and Haagan became Hogan when he took U.S. citizenship.

In 1873 Ring moved to Whalan, Minnesota, where he served as postmaster and played in the coronet band. Subsequently, he enrolled at and graduated from Bennett College of Eclectic Medicine and Surgery in Chicago, Illinois (now Loyola University Chicago School of Medicine).

He married his wife Ida (1860–1901) before 1877 and they moved back to Whalan, Minnesota where Ring had a medical practice and drug store. He sold the practice in 1878, and the family moved to Grand Island, Nebraska for nine years.

Hogan, Ida and their children Johannes Glenellyn (born 1877), Rena (born 1882), Mildred (born 1887), and Verna Helene arrived in Ferndale in 1887 and two sons, Ronald Lowe (born 1894) and Arden Garrison (born 1899), were born afterwards. Ring was one of the town's physicians until 1930, surviving his wife Ida who died in 1900, subsequently marrying widow Eleanor Black Andreasen, with whom he had two more sons (Harlan, born 1905, and Ingvald Taft). Besides Ring's children, the family included Eleanor's two children from her first marriage. Altogether ten Ring children grew up in the mansion. Ring's brother, Jacob, was a pharmacist and opened practice on Main Street.

In 1890, Ring's practice was located next to the old post office. From 1894 to 1896 he was in practice with Dr. Ross at various locations including next to the Red Star Clothing store on Main Street. Ring also practiced at the new Brown/Hart building in 1902; in a building no longer extant due to fire. In 1906, the building at 350 Main Street was built for his practice. Nearing the end of his life it was said he had delivered half the people in town as babies. Dr. Ring was a trustee of the High School District when it opened and his home was a social center of town, with musical events featuring Verna and Dr. Ring playing duets on piano and violin. On August 26, 1902, The Ferndale Enterprise reported that Ring daughter Verna Helene married Charles Francis Taubman in a double wedding with his brother Harry Taubman and Helene Helgestad in the parlor at the Mansion with a reception in a tent on the grounds. The Taubman's were sons of the owner of Ferndale's Red Star Clothing Store on Main Street. Their father Lee Taubman built two homes on Rose Avenue in East Ferndale.

Dr. Ring had improvements made to the house by John Kerri in 1905, by A.L. Trousdale in 1909 and the latter painted the entire house pure white in 1913.

=== Ferndale General Hospital ===
In 1910 Dr. Ring and Dr. Phelan opened the first Ferndale General Hospital at a building on Washington Street formerly occupied by the Catholic Convent. In 1913 Dr. F.M. Bruner bought into the practice. This situation persisted until the Catholic sisters returned to open a school in Ferndale in 1915. The hospital relocated to the Bruner/Wunderlich home.

In 1920, Dr. Ring suggested that his mansion be converted into a public hospital by contractor Frank Slingsby. A 50-foot addition was put on the back of the family home and the hospital opened on March 25, 1921.

New Ferndale Hospital opens to public; is finely equipped ... splendidly located on Berding street at the corner of Brown, the spacious building, with modern equipment and planned to obtain the most perfect results for convenience and comfort, stands as a monument to the progressiveness of the people of this valley, who have made its construction possible ... a corridor runs the entire length of the building on the lower floor. Entering from the front, on the left comes first the public office, then to the rear an emergency operating room, bath room, three bed ward, dining room and kitchen. Off the kitchen is the wash room for linen, with stationery bus and sterilizer. The entrance to the basement is from this room, and here is to be found the steam heating plant and stationery vacuum cleaner, with connections to all rooms. To the right of the corridor is a nurse's reception room, with the superintendent's room, to the rear. Then three private rooms, the housekeeper's room and smaller rooms for different purposes. On the second floor a corridor likewise extends through the center the entire depth of the hospital. On the left are a three-bed ward, two private rooms, linen rooms, bath room and the operating and sterilizing rooms. On the right are the maternity ward, nursery, two private rooms, diet kitchen, x-ray room and dark room. Four rooms for nurses are on the third floor, with space for more rooms there if required ...

In 1926, the rear stairs were added by contractor L.C. Ericksen due to state regulations on hospitals. At about this time, the Ferndale General Hospital closed and Dr. Ring had offices on Main Street in the Heney building. In 1928, after being closed for two years, the hospital, grounds and all fixtures were sold to Dr. O.B. Barron at auction to satisfy the foreclosure of the mortgage of $2,600 (equivalent to $48,750 in 2025). The Barrons moved into the home in September 1928, and Dr. Barron practiced medicine in the building.

After 43 years of service in Ferndale, Doctor Ring died in 1930. In 1931 a memorial to Dr. Ring was erected on the grounds of the Ferndale Library.

=== Later uses ===
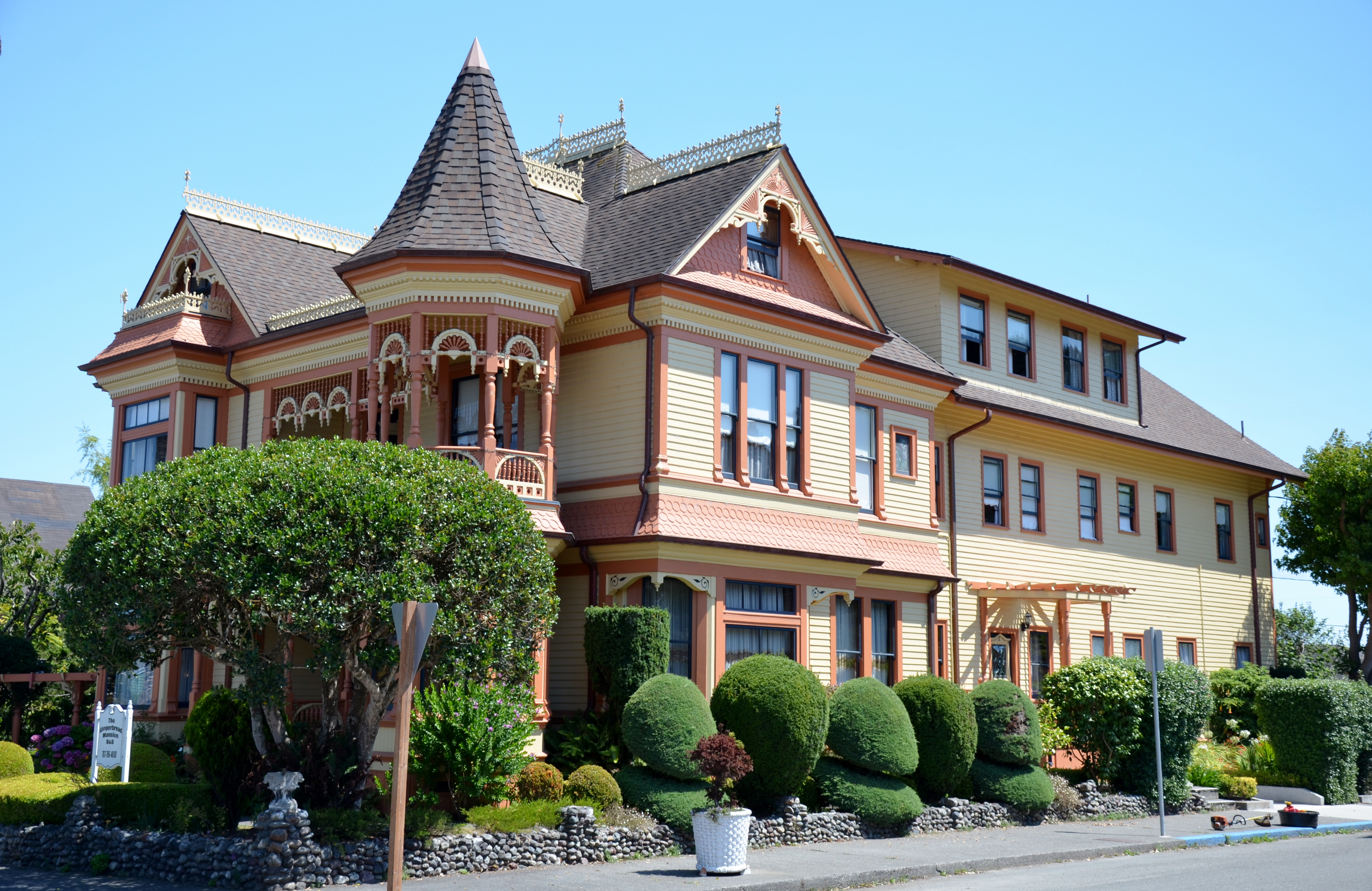
Gingerbread Mansion in August 2015

Subsequent to its use as the Ferndale General Hospital, the mansion was Ferndale's first American Legion Post veteran's building, a rest home operated by Mrs. Mabel Klaverweiden, a private home, apartments and finally a bed-and-breakfast inn. During the 1970s, owners Thomas Manning and Donald L. Dickerson maintained and enhanced the garden's border shrubbery, story-tall camellias at the entry, brick paths, statues, and fountains. It was at this time that the building was painted in bright colors. In the 1980s, owner Ken Torbert converted the apartments to a Bed and Breakfast and continued to develop the gardens. The first floor was returned to classical Victorian style, but at least one author has been surprised by the sensual nature of the upstairs bedrooms. Two child ghosts have been reported. The iconic palm tree was a victim of the California drought in 2016.

The Gingerbread Mansion is referred to as one of the most often photographed bed-and-breakfasts in the United States. It has been featured in National Geographic, September 1977, as well as Sunset Magazine, April 1972 which featured the gardens. In 1998, the formal English gardens were mature and the building was painted yellow gold on the siding, but the trim, now orange, was painted peach pink. The building has been painted gold and orange since at least 2001.
