= A. Berding House =

Historic house in California, United States

- U.S. National Register of Historic Places
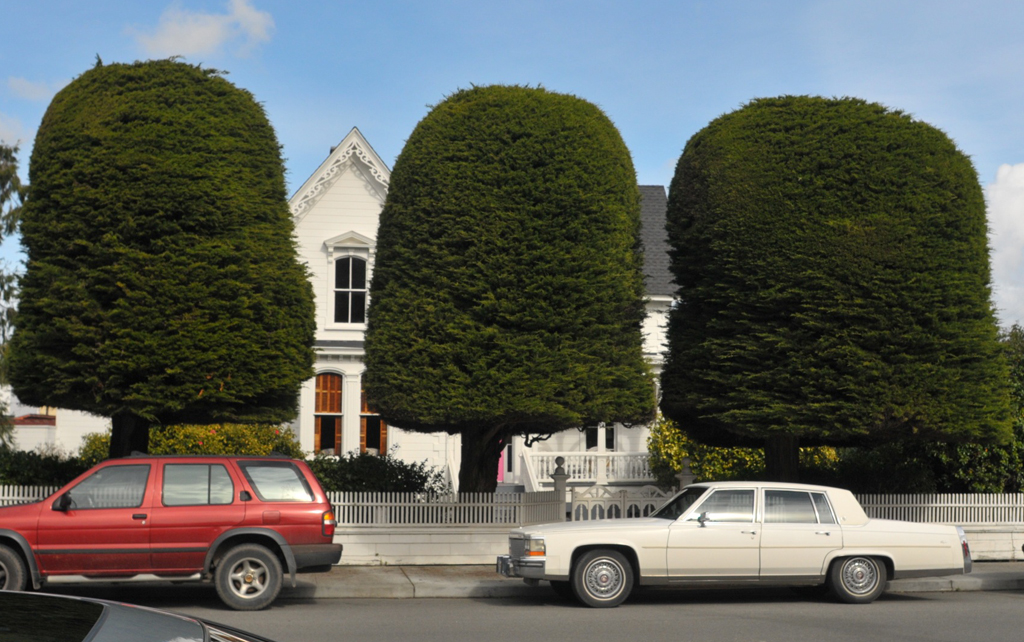
- The A. Berding House is also called "The Gum Drop Tree House" for the carefully trimmed row of cypresses in front.
- Location: 455 Ocean Avenue, Ferndale, California
- Coordinates: 40°34′33″N 124°15′46″W
- Area: 0.4 acres (0.16 ha)
- Built: 1875
- Architectural style: Carpenter Gothic
- NRHP reference No.: 83001180
- Added to NRHP: January 4, 1983

The A. Berding Home is a historic Carpenter Gothic Victorian style house with Italianate accents built by pioneer merchant Arnold Berding in 1875 at 455 Ocean Avenue in Ferndale, Humboldt County, California is also called "The Gum Drop Tree House" from the neatly trimmed row of 150 year old cypresses in front.

== History ==
Born in Germany in 1826, Berding arrived in Humboldt County by a route that included Rio de Janeiro, San Francisco, and the California Gold Rush mining camps. In 1857 he arrived in Humboldt County and set up a store, hotel, livery and post office at the now-abandoned village of Centerville, California where Abraham Lincoln appointed him Centerville's first and only postmaster.

In January 1860, shortly after the victims from the wreck of the Northerner were buried in a mass grave marked by the Centerville Beach Cross, wreck salvage was sold at auction at Berding's Centerville store. After selling the Centerville businesses, Berding spent a short time in Oregon, returning to Ferndale in 1866 and opening the first merchandise store in town.

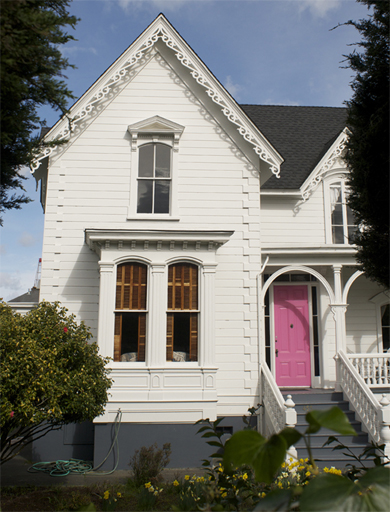
Front view of A. Berding House, built in 1875

Local justice of the peace Seth Shaw, married Berding and Mary Blum (b. 1832), a widow with three small children, June 7, 1867. The small residence they built in 1868 was moved around the corner and replaced with the current house where the Berdings had four more children together. In 1888 after much illness, the Berdings had a high brick foundation laid to raise the house. The 1900 Census shows that Arnold, Mary and two of their children were living in the Berding house, although they traveled frequently. The newspaper reports regular trips to San Francisco and in 1904, that Mary Berding and daughter Christina traveled across the United States to attend the St. Louis Exposition, and visit relatives from Illinois to Idaho. In 1909 the Ferndale Enterprise noted that the home of "Pioneer Berding" had recently been improved and renovated.

The house was added to the National Register of Historic Places on 4 January 1983. Much of the extant furniture was purchased by Arnold and Mary Berding. The parlor was last wallpapered and painted in 1889 for a wedding.

The house is owned by the Berding family via a trust.
