= Port Kenyon, California =

Unincorporated community in California, United States

Port Kenyon
- Unincorporated community
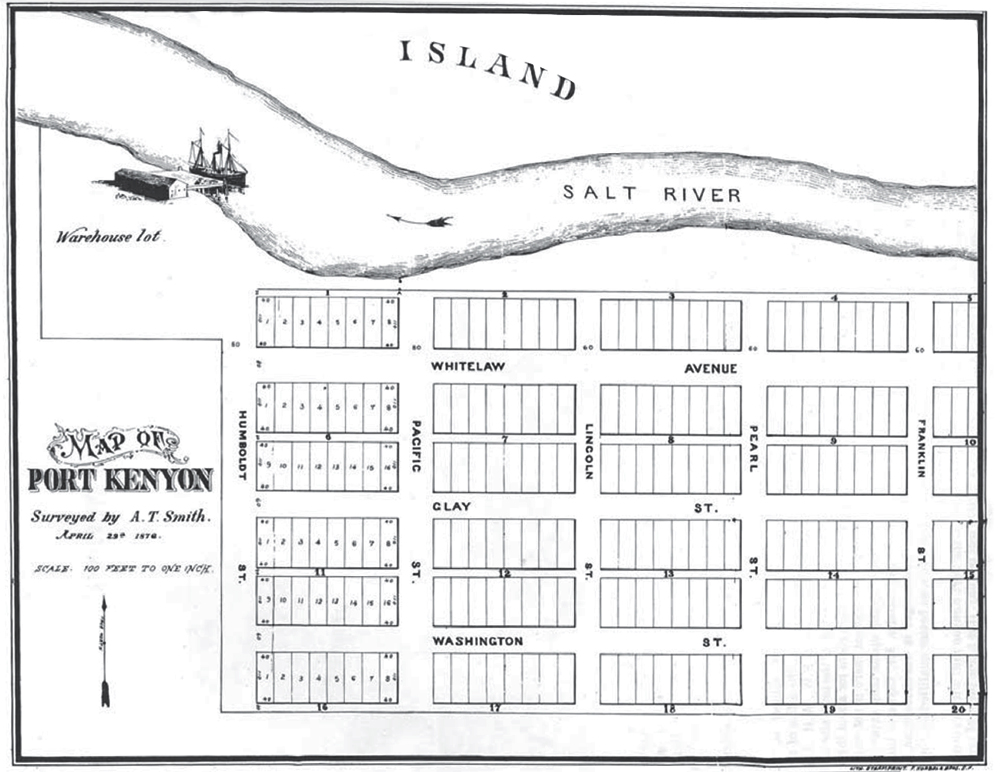
- 1876 hypothetical plat map showing relative wharf location

- Location in California Port Kenyon (the United States)
- Coordinates: 40°35′42″N 124°16′47″W
- Country: United States
- State: California
- County: Humboldt
- Elevation: 13 ft (4 m)

Port Kenyon is an unincorporated community in Humboldt County, California, United States. It is located 1.5 miles (2.4 km) northwest of Ferndale, at an elevation of 13 feet (4 m).

A post office operated at Port Kenyon from 1886 to 1899 and from 1903 to 1913. The town was founded by John Gardner Kenyon in 1876. The town was initially a major point of shipping for locally raised dairy products; it also had a fish cannery. After silting of the Salt River and repeated flooding, the port declined in the 1890s.

== See also ==
- Salt River (California)
