= National Register of Historic Places listings in Humboldt County, California =

Location of Humboldt County in California

This is a list of the National Register of Historic Places listings in Humboldt County, California.

This is intended to be a complete list of the properties and districts on the National Register of Historic Places in Humboldt County, California, United States. Latitude and longitude coordinates are provided for many National Register properties and districts; these locations may be seen together in an online map.

There are 58 properties and districts listed on the National Register in the county, including 1 National Historic Landmark.

This National Park Service list is complete through NPS recent listings posted September 4, 2026.

== Current listings ==
	Name on the Register	Image	Date listed	Location	City or town	Description
1	Alford-Nielson House	Alford-Nielson House	January 23, 1986 (#86000100)	1299 Main St. 40°35′09″N 124°15′29″W	Ferndale	1874 French Second Empire, moved from 421 to 1299 Main Street in 1893
2	F. W. Andreasen-John Rossen House	F. W. Andreasen-John Rossen House	September 25, 1989 (#89000855)	Port Kenyon Rd. and Bush St. 40°35′38″N 124°16′21″W	Ferndale	1901 Queen Anne, William S. Fitzell (architect)
3	Bald Hills Archaeological District		July 9, 1982 (#82001723)	Address Restricted	Orick	c. 500 B.C. to 1000 A.D. Chilula cultural site
4	Bank of Eureka Building	Bank of Eureka Building	April 12, 1982 (#82002180)	240 E St. 40°48′13″N 124°09′59″W	Eureka	1911, Classic Revival, now Clarke Memorial Museum
5	Bank of Loleta	Bank of Loleta	February 28, 1985 (#85000354)	358 Main St. 40°38′26″N 124°13′26″W	Loleta	1920 Classical Revival commercial building (1985 NRHP plaque)
6	Benbow Inn	Benbow Inn	September 15, 1983 (#83001179)	445 Lake Benbow Dr. 40°04′04″N 123°47′19″W	Garberville	1925 Tudor Revival Hotel
7	A. Berding House	A. Berding House	January 4, 1983 (#83001180)	455 Ocean Ave. 40°34′33″N 124°15′46″W	Ferndale	1875, also called "The Gum Drop Tree House" for the row of trimmed Cypress trees in front
8	California Federation of Women's Clubs Grove Hearthstone		July 5, 2024 (#100010512)	0.28 miles (0.45 km) southwest of Highway 254 (Avenue of the Giants); 40°20′34″N 123°56′16″W	Weott	
9	Carlotta Hotel		May 23, 1978 (#78000671)	Central Ave. 40°32′17″N 124°03′30″W	Carlotta	Built in 1904, burned down in 1995
10	Carnegie Free Library	Carnegie Free Library	January 23, 1986 (#86000101)	636 F St. 40°48′02″N 124°09′52″W	Eureka	1903, currently Morris Graves Museum of Art
11	John G. Chapman House	John G. Chapman House	September 29, 2011 (#11000713)	974 10th St. 40°52′14″N 124°05′18″W	Arcata	
12	William S. Clark House	William S. Clark House	January 14, 1988 (#87002394)	1406 C St. 40°47′39″N 124°10′03″W	Eureka	1888, 1.5 story Eastlake Residential
13	John A. Cottrell House	John A. Cottrell House	September 28, 2005 (#05001084)	1228 C St. 40°47′43″N 124°10′04″W	Eureka	c.1900, 2 Story Queen Anne/Eastlake Residence
14	De-No-To Cultural District		April 24, 1985 (#85000901)	Address Restricted	Hoopa	Hupa, Karuk cultural site
15	Eureka Historic District	Eureka Historic District	October 15, 1991 (#91001523)	Roughly, First, Second and Third Sts., between C and N Sts. 40°48′17″N 124°09′47″W	Eureka	11 block long, three block wide district of Late Victorian, Greek Revival, Classical Revival storefronts & residences. Includes the E. Janssen Building and the Bank of Eureka Building
16	Eureka Inn	Eureka Inn	February 11, 1982 (#82002181)	7th and F Sts. 40°48′00″N 124°09′49″W	Eureka	1900 Tudor Revival Hotel
17	Eureka Theatre	Eureka Theatre	January 7, 2010 (#09001199)	612 F St. 40°48′03″N 124°09′58″W	Eureka	1937 Streamline Moderne Theater
18	Falk Archaeological District		November 6, 2023 (#100009504)	Address Restricted	Eureka	
19	Fern Cottage Historic District	Fern Cottage Historic District	January 7, 1988 (#87002294)	2121 Centerville Road; 40°35′04″N 124°18′32″W	Ferndale	160 acre historic district: 16 buildings and 2 structures contribute to listing including historic Fern Cottage, home of the Russ pioneer family.
20	Fernbridge	Fernbridge	April 2, 1987 (#87000566)	CA 211; 40°36′51″N 124°12′08″W	Fernbridge	1,320 feet (400 m) concrete arch built 1911, John B. Leonard (engineer) https://ca.water.usgs.gov/webcams/fernbridge/
21	Ferndale Main Street Historic District	Ferndale Main Street Historic District	January 10, 1994 (#93001461)	300–580 Main, 330 Ocean Avenue and 207–290 Francis Street; 40°34′35″N 124°15′45″W	Ferndale	5 block long Italianate, Stick/Eastlake, Queen Anne commercial and mixed use buildings
22	Ferndale Public Library	Ferndale Public Library	December 10, 1990 (#90001815)	807 Main St. 40°34′47″N 124°15′36″W	Ferndale	1910 Classical Revival Carnegie Library, Warren Skellings (architect) http://www.carnegie-libraries.org/california/ferndale.html
23	First and F Street Building	First and F Street Building	July 12, 1974 (#74000511)	112 F St. 40°48′19″N 124°09′57″W	Eureka	1893, commercial corner Stick/Eastlake
24	Grizzly Bluff School	Grizzly Bluff School	November 27, 1979 (#79000476)	East of Ferndale on Grizzly Bluff Road; 40°33′46″N 124°10′12″W	Ferndale	1871 Greek Revival School House
25	Gunther Island Site 67	Gunther Island Site 67	15 October 1966 (#66000208)	Humboldt Bay; 40°48′47″N 124°10′06″W	Eureka	location of the 1860 Wiyot Massacre
26	Gushaw-Mudgett House	Gushaw-Mudgett House	January 11, 1982 (#82002184)	820 9th St. 40°35′57″N 124°09′28″W	Fortuna	1884, Italianate, Stick/Eastlake residence
27	Holy Trinity Church	Holy Trinity Church	August 6, 1980 (#80004608)	Parker and Hector St. 41°03′33″N 124°08′29″W	Trinidad	1850
28	Hoopa Valley Adobe	Hoopa Valley Adobe	January 7, 2013 (#10000893)	Campus Street; 41°02′51″N 123°40′43″W	Hoopa	
29	Hotel Arcata	Hotel Arcata	January 5, 1984 (#84000775)	708 9th St. 40°52′09″N 124°05′05″W	Arcata	1900 Hotel
30	Humboldt Bay Life-Saving Station	Humboldt Bay Life-Saving Station	October 30, 1979 (#79000477)	South of Samoa on Samoa Rd; 40°46′05″N 124°13′05″W	Samoa	1875/1936, Coast Guard Building
31	Humboldt Bay Woolen Mill	Humboldt Bay Woolen Mill	June 25, 1982 (#82002182)	1400 Broadway; 40°47′38″N 124°10′35″W	Eureka	1901, 2 story frame industrial with 1920s add-ons was demolished in 1987. Second from left on bottom row, #21 on original map.
32	Jacoby Building	Jacoby Building	June 17, 1982 (#82002179)	791 8th St. 40°52′06″N 124°05′10″W	Arcata	1850, Four Story Renaissance, Classical Revival built for storehouse and shops
33	E. Janssen Building	E. Janssen Building	July 16, 1973 (#73000402)	422 First St. 40°48′18″N 124°09′59″W	Eureka	1875, 2 story cast-iron fronted Italianate loft commercial building built for general merchandise and groceries
34	James Kleiser House	James Kleiser House	January 30, 2023 (#100008586)	1022 10th St. 40°52′13″N 124°05′20″W	Arcata	
35	Lower Blackburn Grade Bridge	Lower Blackburn Grade Bridge	June 25, 1981 (#81000148)	Northwest of Bridgeville on CA 36; 40°28′50″N 123°53′22″W	Bridgeville	1925
36	Lyons Ranches Historic District		March 19, 2018 (#100002212)	Bald Hills Road, Redwoods National Park; 41°08′53″N 123°53′36″W	Orick vicinity	
37	D. C. McDonald Building	D. C. McDonald Building	November 17, 1982 (#82000966)	108 F Street; 40°48′18″N 124°09′57″W	Eureka	1904, 2 Story, Classical Revival, at left end of historic row in photo.
38	George McFarlan House	George McFarlan House	November 15, 1978 (#78000672)	1410 2nd St. 40°48′22″N 124°09′20″W	Eureka	ca. 1857, Greek Revival, possibly a kit house or reassembled on site as parts are numbered
39	Odd Fellows Hall	Odd Fellows Hall	May 3, 1978 (#78000673)	123 F St. 40°48′17″N 124°10′00″W	Eureka	1882, 2 Story Second Empire
40	Old Jacoby Creek School	Old Jacoby Creek School	February 28, 1985 (#85000353)	2212 Jacoby Creek Rd. 40°50′34″N 124°03′43″W	Bayside	1900
41	Phillips House	Phillips House	October 24, 1985 (#85003373)	71 East Seventh Street; 40°51′58″N 124°04′37″W	Arcata	1850, Greek Revival
42	Prairie Creek Fish Hatchery	Prairie Creek Fish Hatchery	February 4, 2000 (#00000034)	Milepost 124.83 on US 101, north of Orick; 41°19′59″N 124°01′45″W	Orick	In use 1925 to 1949.
43	Punta Gorda Light Station	Punta Gorda Light Station	September 1, 1976 (#76000483)	10.5 miles (16.9 km) southwest of Petrolia; 40°14′58″N 124°20′44″W	Petrolia	1900 Light House
44	Pythian Castle	Pythian Castle	February 20, 1986 (#86000263)	1100 H St. 40°52′16″N 124°05′06″W	Arcata	1875, 2 story Queen Anne Knights of Pythias meeting hall
45	Rectory, Catholic Church of the Assumption	Rectory, Catholic Church of the Assumption	February 11, 1982 (#82002183)	563 Ocean Avenue; 40°34′30″N 124°15′42″W	Ferndale	1875 Queen Anne, Stick/Eastlake, George F. Costerisa, builder/architect
46	Thomas F. Ricks House	Thomas F. Ricks House	October 2, 1992 (#92001302)	730 H Street; 40°48′00″N 124°09′45″W	Eureka	c.1885, 2 story Eastlake, portico and double 2 story bays
47	Schorlig House	Schorlig House	November 20, 1978 (#78000670)	1050 12th Street; 40°52′21″N 124°05′14″W	Arcata	1875 residence
48	Shaw House	Shaw House	September 13, 1984 (#84000777)	703 Main Street; 40°34′45″N 124°15′39″W	Ferndale	1866 Carpenter Gothic, served as post office and courthouse
49	Simpson-Vance House	Simpson-Vance House	July 17, 1986 (#86001668)	904 G Street; 40°47′55″N 124°09′47″W	Eureka	1892, 2 Story Queen Anne, polygonal corner tower
50	Stone House	Stone House	February 27, 1986 (#86000267)	902 14th Street; 40°52′25″N 124°05′11″W	Arcata	1875, Queen Anne
51	Sweasey Theater-Loew's State Theater	Sweasey Theater-Loew's State Theater	June 5, 2009 (#09000372)	412 G St. 40°48′10″N 124°09′54″W	Eureka	1919 theater with terracotta facade
52	Tishawnik		January 21, 2015 (#12000397)	Address Restricted	Orleans	
53	Trinidad Head Light Station	Trinidad Head Light Station	September 3, 1991 (#91001098)	Trinidad Head; 41°03′14″N 124°08′55″W	Trinidad	1871, light elevation of 196 feet, bluff-mounted lighthouse elevation 20 feet
54	Tsahpek		December 5, 1972 (#72000224)	Address Restricted	Eureka	Yurok village, also known as Tsah Pek
55	U.S. Post Office and Courthouse	U.S. Post Office and Courthouse	February 10, 1983 (#83001181)	514 H Street; 40°48′07″N 124°09′47″W	Eureka	1909, 3 Story Renaissance Revival
56	Washington School	Washington School	April 12, 2002 (#02000329)	1910 California Street; 40°47′27″N 124°10′16″W	Eureka	2 story school house
57	Whaley House	Whaley House	December 31, 1979 (#79000475)	1395 H Street; 40°52′23″N 124°05′03″W	Arcata	1850 Greek Revival
58	Magdalena Zanone House	Magdalena Zanone House	April 21, 2004 (#04000335)	1604 G Street; 40°47′35″N 124°09′47″W	Eureka	c.1908, 2 story Queen Anne with tower

== See also ==
- List of National Historic Landmarks in California
- National Register of Historic Places listings in California
- California Historical Landmarks in Humboldt County, California
