= Allen Aaron Cook =

American architect

Allen Aaron Cook (April 20, 1832 – February 12, 1899), usually known as A. A. Cook, was an American architect who came to Sacramento, California in 1870. He designed numerous buildings around the state, including a number which are listed on the U.S. National Register of Historic Places for their architecture.

== Biography ==
Cook was born on April 20, 1832, in Chenango County, New York. His parents moved to Albany, New York in that year, which is where Cook grew up and attended school. He married Maria Midler of Pennsylvania on January 12, 1870, in Douglas, NE; they had six children, four of whom survived to adulthood. Two other children died of measles on 21 March 21, 1882.

He died in Shingle Springs, California, on February 12, 1899.

== Selected works ==
- the Wheatland Masonic Temple, in Wheatland, California, NRHP-listed
- the Odd Fellows Building (1882–83) in Red Bluff, California, NRHP-listed
- Cone and Kimball Building at 747 Main St. in Red Bluff, NRHP-listed
- Pleasants Ranch at 8212 Pleasants Valley Rd. in Vacaville, California, NRHP-listed
- courthouse at Redding
- Stansbury Home (1883), Chico, California, NRHP-listed
- Hotel DeVilbiss (1899-90), 2-10 Main Street, Winters, California, a contributing building in the NRHP-listed Downtown Winters Historic District
- state prison at Folsom, California
- Western Hotel, Sacramento, a listed California Historical Landmark
- Hale's Block, Sacramento
- county hospitals in Colusa, Mendocino and Tehama
- churches at Redding, Sacramento, Stockton, and Wheatland
- Nevada State Asylum
