= California Historical Landmarks in Humboldt County =

List table of the properties and districts listed as California Historical Landmarks within Humboldt County, Northern California.

- Note: Click the "Map of all coordinates" link to the right to view a Google map of all properties and districts with latitude and longitude coordinates in the table below.

== Listings ==
Image		Landmark name	Location	City or town	Summary
Arcata and Mad River Rail Road Company	842	Arcata and Mad River Rail Road Company	330 Railroad Ave. 40°52′53″N 123°59′27″W	Blue Lake	
California's First Drilled Oil Wells	543	California's First Drilled Oil Wells	Mattole Rd. & Front St. 40°19′28″N 124°17′13″W	Petrolia	
Camp Curtis	215	Camp Curtis	L.K. Wood Blvd-Frontage Rd. 40°53′28″N 124°04′46″W	Arcata	
Centerville Beach Cross	173	Centerville Beach Cross	Centerville Rd. 40°34′11″N 124°21′06″W	Ferndale	
City of Eureka	477	City of Eureka	City; 40°48′13″N 124°09′59″W	Eureka	
Ferndale	883	Ferndale	Historic district 40°34′36″N 124°15′48″W	Ferndale	Also on the NRHP NPS-93001461
Fort Humboldt	154	Fort Humboldt	3431 Fort Ave. 40°46′37″N 124°11′20″W	Eureka	
Humboldt Harbor Historical District	882	Humboldt Harbor Historical District	Harold Larsen Vista Pt. 40°45′14″N 124°12′55″W	Eureka	
Jacoby Building	783	Jacoby Building	8th & H (SE Corner); 40°52′06″N 124°05′13″W	Arcata	
The Old Arrow Tree	164	The Old Arrow Tree	40°52′01″N 123°57′01″W	Korbel	
Old Indian Village of Tsurai	838	Old Indian Village of Tsurai	41°03′34″N 124°08′35″W	Trinidad	
Town of Trinidad	216	Town of Trinidad	Historic district 41°03′33″N 124°08′35″W	Trinidad	
Trinidad Head	146	Trinidad Head	Hwy 101; 41°03′16″N 124°09′03″W	Trinidad	

== See also ==
- List of California Historical Landmarks
- National Register of Historic Places listings in Humboldt County, California
