= Wheatland Masonic Temple =

- U.S. National Register of Historic Places
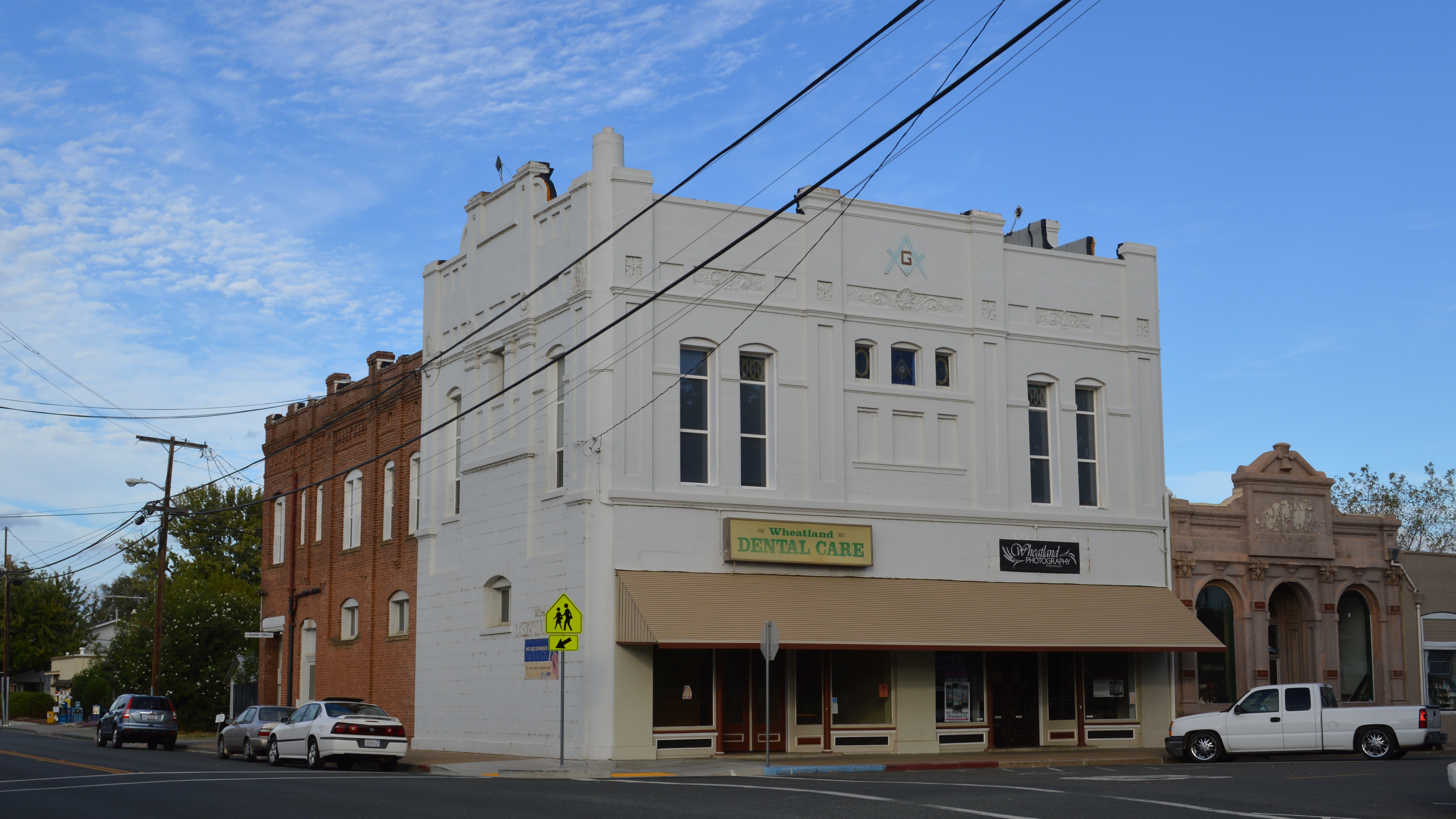

- Location within California Location within the United States
- Location: 400 Front St., Wheatland, California
- Coordinates: 39°0′40″N 121°25′20″W
- Area: less than one acre
- Built: 1898
- Built by: Bovyer, E.A.
- Architect: Cook, A.A.
- Architectural style: Classical Revival
- NRHP reference No.: 93001396
- Added to NRHP: December 23, 1993

The Wheatland Masonic Temple in Wheatland, California is a historic building constructed in 1898. The ground floor has been used as commercial space since its construction. Until 1948 the upper floor meeting rooms were used jointly by the Independent Order of Odd Fellows and the Freemasons. In 1948 the Masons bought out the Odd Fellows.

It was listed on the National Register of Historic Places in 1993.

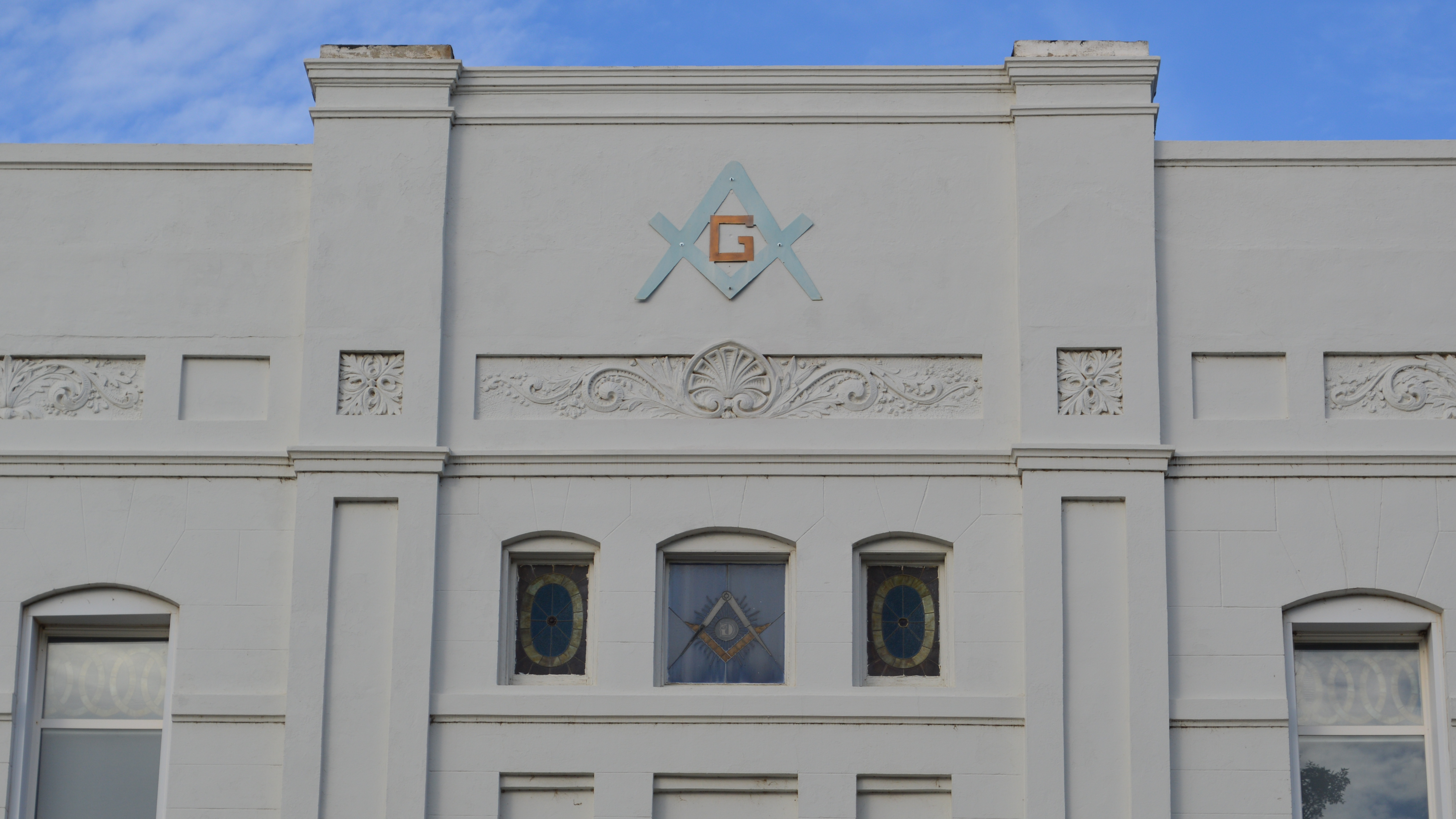
Detail work on the temple

It was designed by Sacramento architect A. A. Cook who also designed:

- the Odd Fellows Building (1882–83) in Red Bluff, California,
- the NRHP-listed Cone and Kimball Building at 747 Main St. in Red Bluff, and
- the NRHP-listed Pleasants Ranch at 8212 Pleasants Valley Rd. in Vacaville, California.
