= Historic Chinatown Alley =

Street in California, US

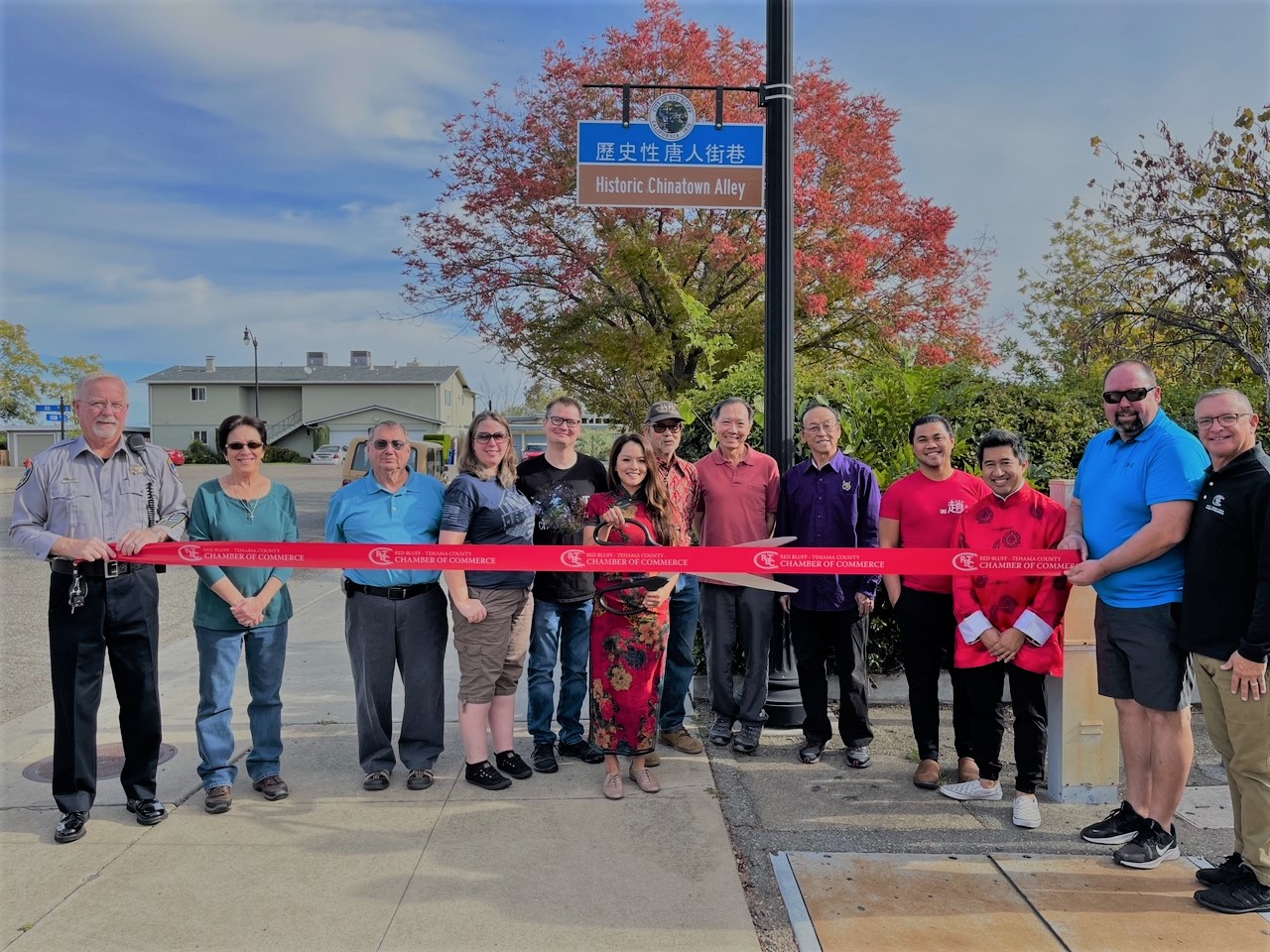
As a dedication to the last Chinatown Pioneer of Tehama County, the Historic Chinatown Alley signs were installed on the late Dr. Kenneth Kendall Chew’s birthday October 29, 2022.

The Historic Chinatown Alley (Chinese: 歷史性 唐人街巷) is an official street in the City of Red Bluff, California (Chinese: 雷德布拉夫) located on Rio Street between Hickory Street and Pine Street, with Walnut Street serving as the center of Chinatown for a small town in Tehama County.

== History ==
As early as 1852, four years after the first contingent of Chinese arrived in California to work the gold mines during the California Gold Rush, a Chinatown was created to serve the growing population arriving at the last steamboat stop known as Head of Navigation in Red Bluff, California.

There were five original families who settled and made Red Bluff, California their home in the New World. Following the death of Joe You Chew, the Helen and Joe Chew Foundation with the support from the Chinese American descendants of Red Bluff, California championed the “Historic Chinatown Alley” street naming receiving unanimous approval from the Red Bluff City Council and Planning Commission. The alleyway now looks down upon the Chinatown that was cherished in the hearts of many families, unveiling Red Bluff, California’s History of Chinese Americans.

=== Rise and Fall ===
Until 1875, Red Bluff was the last steamboat stop on the Sacramento River. While Chinatown was a segregated neighborhood, it was not hindered from thriving because of its access to many modes of transportation first being adjacent to the Sacramento River and later the railroad, followed by Route 99 making access to ship and receive goods fairly easily. Chinatown blossomed through the 1970s until the construction of the I-5 freeway which had changed the flow of traffic causing many to relocate

== Current use ==
Today, the Historic Chinatown Alley is frequented by the descendants and used as a place for visitors to enjoy a self-guided walking tour.
