= Odd Fellows Building (Red Bluff, California) =

- U.S. National Register of Historic Places
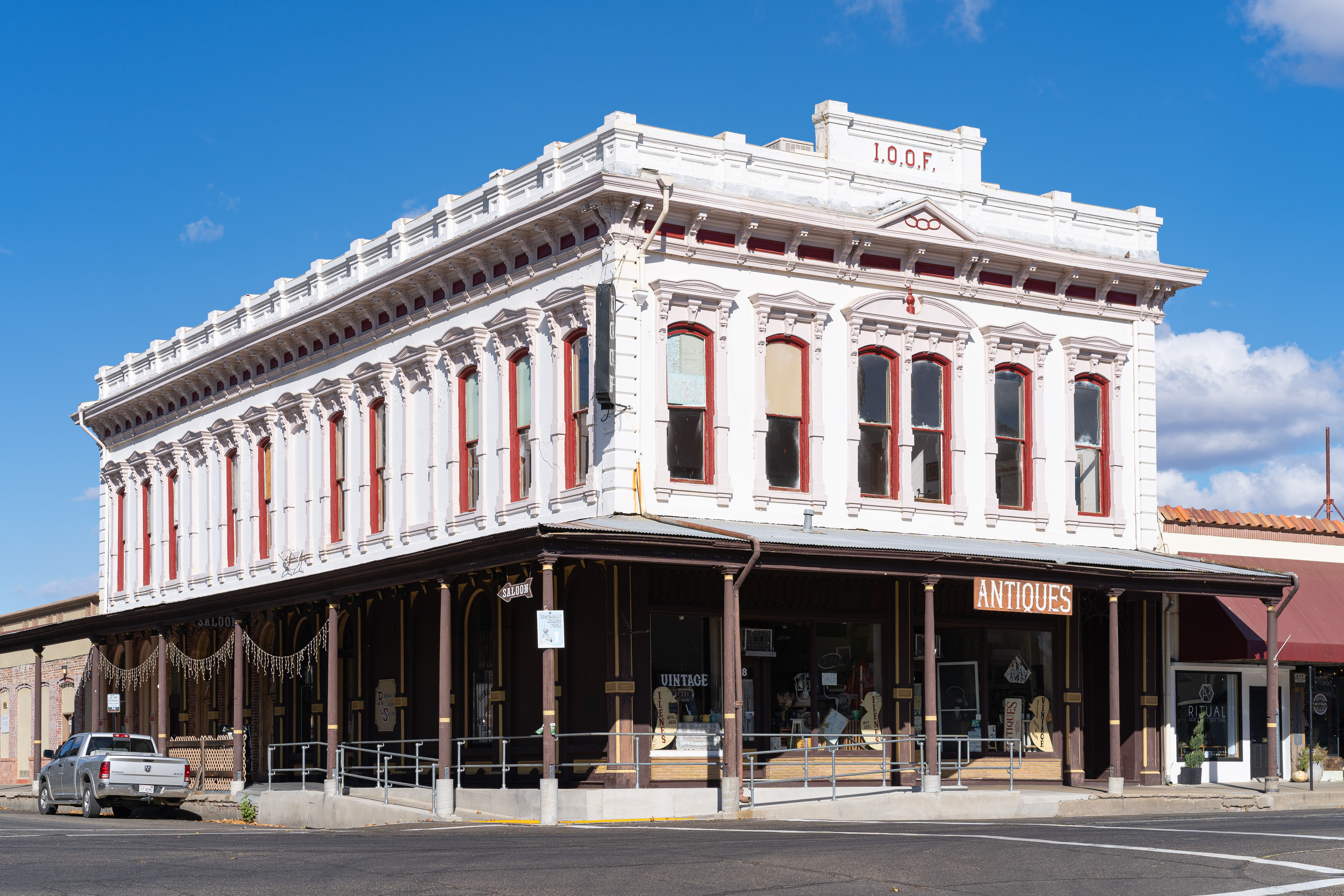

- Location within California Location within the United States
- Location: 342 Oak St., Red Bluff, California
- Coordinates: 40°10′36″N 122°14′3″W
- Area: 0.1 acres (0.040 ha)
- Built: 1882–83
- Built by: Swain & Hudson
- Architect: A.A. Cook
- Architectural style: Italianate-Late Victorian
- NRHP reference No.: 76000537
- Added to NRHP: December 12, 1976

The Odd Fellows Building in Red Bluff, California was built during 1882–83. It was the fourth home of the I.O.O.F. Lodge #76, one of the oldest Odd Fellows groups in Northern California.

It is a two-story 100 feet (30 m) by 45 feet (14 m)red brick building with Italianate style designed by architect A. A. Cook of Sacramento.

It was listed on the National Register of Historic Places in 1976.

A.A. Cook also designed the NRHP-listed Cone and Kimball Building at 747 Main St. in Red Bluff and the NRHP-listed Pleasants Ranch at 8212 Pleasants Valley Rd. in Vacaville, California and the NRHP-listed Wheatland Masonic Temple, at 400 Front St. in Wheatland, California.

== See also ==
- Odd Fellows Hall (Eureka, California): Another lodge in northern California
- National Register of Historic Places listings in Tehama County, California
