= Red Bluff Municipal Airport =

- IATA: RBL; ICAO: KRBL; FAA LID: RBL

Summary
- Airport type: Public
- Operator: City of Red Bluff
- Location: Red Bluff, California
- Elevation AMSL: 343.3 ft / 104.55 m
- Coordinates: 40°09′03″N 122°15′08″W

Map
- Location in CA

Runways
Direction	Length		Surface
Direction	ft	m	Surface
15/33	5,431	1,655.37	Asphalt

Red Bluff Municipal Airport (IATA: RBL, ICAO: KRBL, FAA LID: RBL) is two miles south of Red Bluff, located just off Interstate 5 in Tehama County, California. It was previously known as Bidwell Airport. It has no scheduled airline flights; United Airlines dropped Red Bluff in 1952, Pacific Air Lines left in 1962 and the airport has had few or no airline flights since. RBL sees general aviation and occasional transient aircraft.

== Facilities ==
The airport covers 602 acres (244 ha) and has one asphalt runway: (15/33), 5,431 x 100 ft (1,655 x 30 m). The land was purchased from Tyler Graham in the late 1950s.
