= HSU First Street Gallery =

Art gallery in California

Coordinates: 40°48′18.47″N 124°10′1.98″W

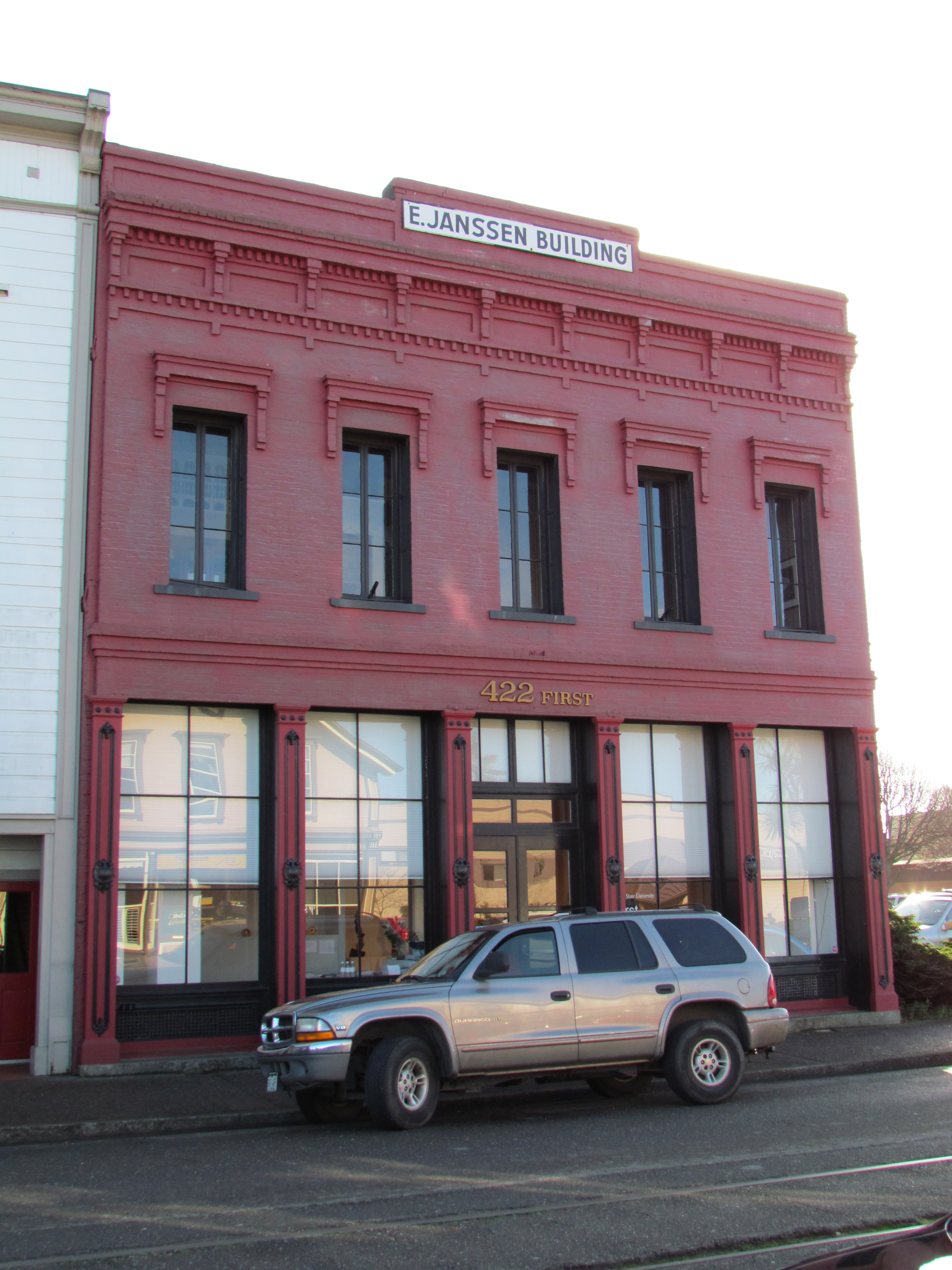
The HSU First Street Gallery

HSU First Street Gallery (later known as the HSU Third Street Gallery) was a contemporary, fine arts gallery located in the E. Janssen Building at 422 1st Street (later moved to 416 3rd Street) in the historic Old Town district of Eureka, California. The gallery, which supported the Exhibition Programs of Humboldt State University, was an off-campus, non-profit student-oriented public outreach program and gallery which showcased regional, national and international artists, as well as art by faculty, staff, students, and alumni of the university.

In September 2018, the university closed the gallery during a round of budget cuts.

== Mission ==
First Street Gallery was charged with the mission of providing the North Coast community of California and the community of Humboldt State University with access to contemporary art by regional, national and international artists, as well as providing a visiting artists program. Within the gallery, HSU students prepared, installed, managed and curated the exhibitions. The students worked in conjunction with HSU's Museum and Gallery Practices program through the HSU Art Department, while emphasizing the importance of environmentally conscious practices. Additionally, the students in HSU's Art Education program utilized the exhibitions as a resource for their curriculum while working with local K-12 students. The First Street Gallery stated that its goal was to create a dialogue about important contemporary cultural issues with the community. With an emphasis on encouraging and facilitating local interest in the arts, HSU First Street Gallery had, from 1998 to 2018, produced numerous exhibitions of contemporary art in a wide array of art forms.

== History ==
First Street Gallery was founded in 1998 by Humboldt State University. The gallery received over 20,000 visitors a year.

== Programs ==
First Street Gallery was a learning environment for students from the Museum and Gallery Practices Program. The HSU Art Education Program used the First Street Gallery as a service learning site for teaching local K-12 students. First Street Gallery brought national and international artists to HSU through the Visiting Artists Program, with the stated purpose of providing to California's North Coast, an expanded, in-depth exposure to new art forms that would otherwise be unavailable to the local population.

== Events ==
On the first Saturday of every month the First Street Gallery participated in the local arts promotion event of Arts Alive!, in which Eureka's galleries and museums are open to the public together with new exhibitions, shows, theater and musical performances. During this event, First Street Gallery hosted an opening reception for its exhibitions. This presented an opportunity for the public to meet with the artists exhibiting at the gallery.
