= Red Bluff Union Elementary School District =

School district in California, United States

Location
- PO Box 1507; Red Bluff, California 96080 United States

District information
- Grades: K–8
- Schools: 3 elementary (K–5), 1 preparatory academy (6–8)

Other information
- Website: www.rbuesd.org

Red Bluff Union Elementary School District is a public school district in Tehama County, California, United States.

== Education ==
=== Middle School ===
- Vista Preparatory Academy

=== Elementary ===
- Bidwell Elementary School
- Jackson Heights Elementary School
- Metteer Elementary School
