= Eureka Inn =

Hotel in Eureka, California

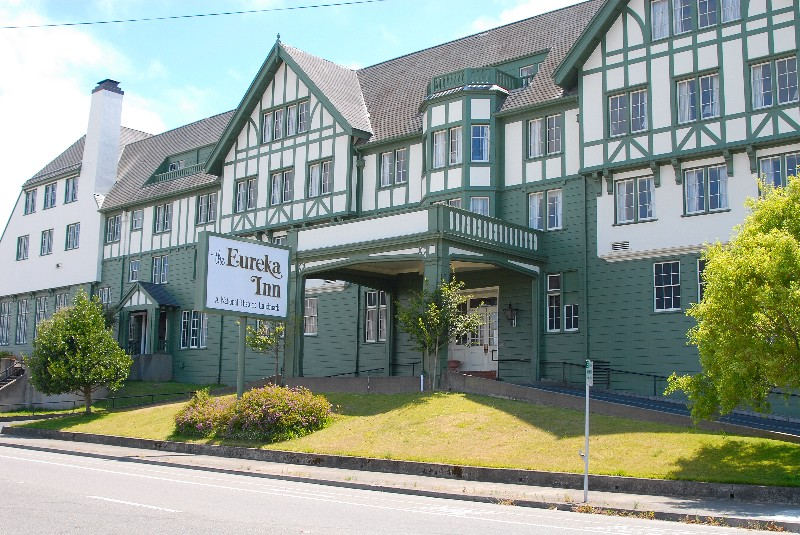
- Front elevation on 7th St.

- Location within California Location within the United States

General information
- Architectural style: Tudor Revival
- Location: Eureka, California, United States
- Coordinates: 40°48′00″N 124°09′55″W
- Completed: 1922, 1924 (major addition of back wing)

Technical details
- Floor count: 4

Design and construction
- Architect: Frederick Whitton

Other information
- Number of rooms: 104
- Eureka Inn
- U.S. National Register of Historic Places
- NRHP reference No.: 82002181
- Added to NRHP: February 11, 1982

The Eureka Inn in Eureka, California, United States, is a four-story, 104-room Elizabethan Tudor Revival architectural style hotel, which opened in 1922. In February 1982, the structure was listed on the National Register of Historic Places.

In 2004, the inn was closed after tax defaults by its owner. In 2008, Libo Zhu purchased the Inn for $2.75 million and began a program of refurbishment. The Inn reopened in May 2010, with renovation work continuing for another decade until completion in 2020.

== History ==
The hotel opened in 1922, coinciding with the opening of the Redwood Highway between Eureka and San Francisco. A large property for those times, the Eureka Inn was the premier full-service lodging between San Francisco and Portland, Oregon. Though it housed many thousands of visitors (including US presidents and royalty) from all over the world during its first several decades, the hotel began to show the effects of time.

In 1960 Helen Barnum, the matriarch of a successful timber family in the county, purchased a controlling interest in the hotel and a process of modernization began.

After Barnum's death in 1993, John Biord purchased her shares from her estate, and also purchased the remaining shares to secure full ownership of the property. However, in 2002 the Internal Revenue Service placed a lien on the inn due to unpaid taxes, and in 2004 the inn closed.

In September 2008, Southern California businessman, Libo Zhu, purchased the inn for $2.75 million. His business plan, reviewed by the Greater Eureka Chamber of Commerce, suggested that he has "ambitious" plans to honor the inn's "integrity as a historic hotel." After refurbishment, Zhu reopened the inn in May 2010.

== Architecture and features ==
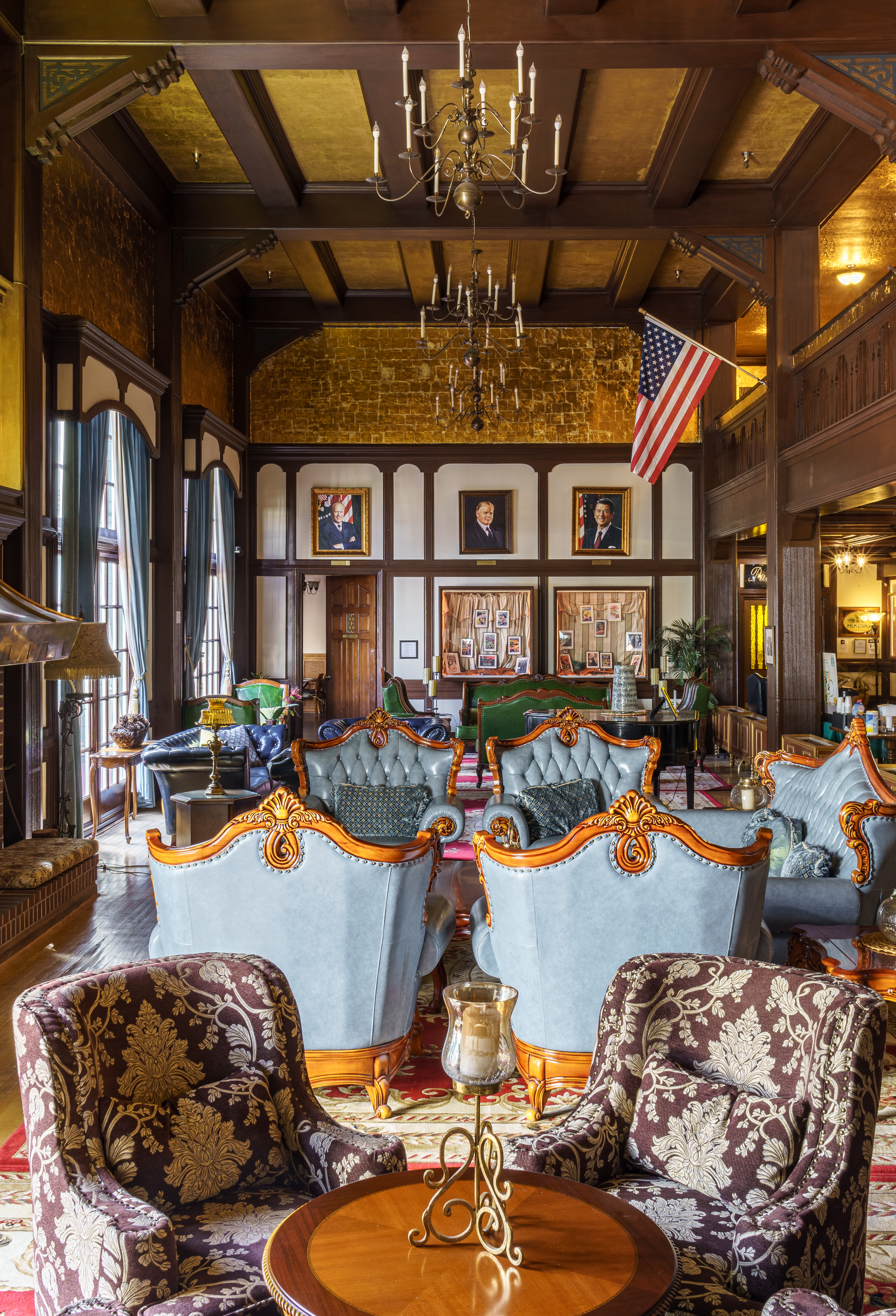
Eureka Inn entrance hall

Architectural details include the use of differing roof forms and "visually stunning textured elevations", which are highlighted by stucco and half-timbering.

The 93,000 sq ft (8,600 m^{2}) hotel, which fully occupies a city block, has had up to 104 guest rooms, including 99 rooms and five full suites. The hotel has historically contained up to three restaurants, two bars, two saunas, an indoor spa, and nine meeting venues, all of which has been supported by up to 140 employees. Resplendent with its courtyard (now primarily a swimming pool), grand entry, great lounge, and giant fireplace, and constructed of Redwood, it is the largest conference facility and third largest lodging property in the region.

The building, a National Register of Historic Places property, remained closed for several years, awaiting an owner who could return it to its rightful place as the cultural hub of the Greater Eureka Area. Though the exterior was refurbished in 2005, including a return to its 1920s color scheme of white with green highlighting and trim, the interior rooms and public areas needed updating and remodeling to be made again ready for the public.

== In popular culture ==
Stucco and half-timbering on facade

The inn appears extensively in the 2018 film An Evening with Beverly Luff Linn, under the name of The Moorhouse Hotel. Both the exterior and interior were used in the film.

== See also ==
- Hotel Arcata: Another nearby historic hotel
- National Register of Historic Places listings in Humboldt County, California
