= Hotel Arcata =

- U.S. National Register of Historic Places
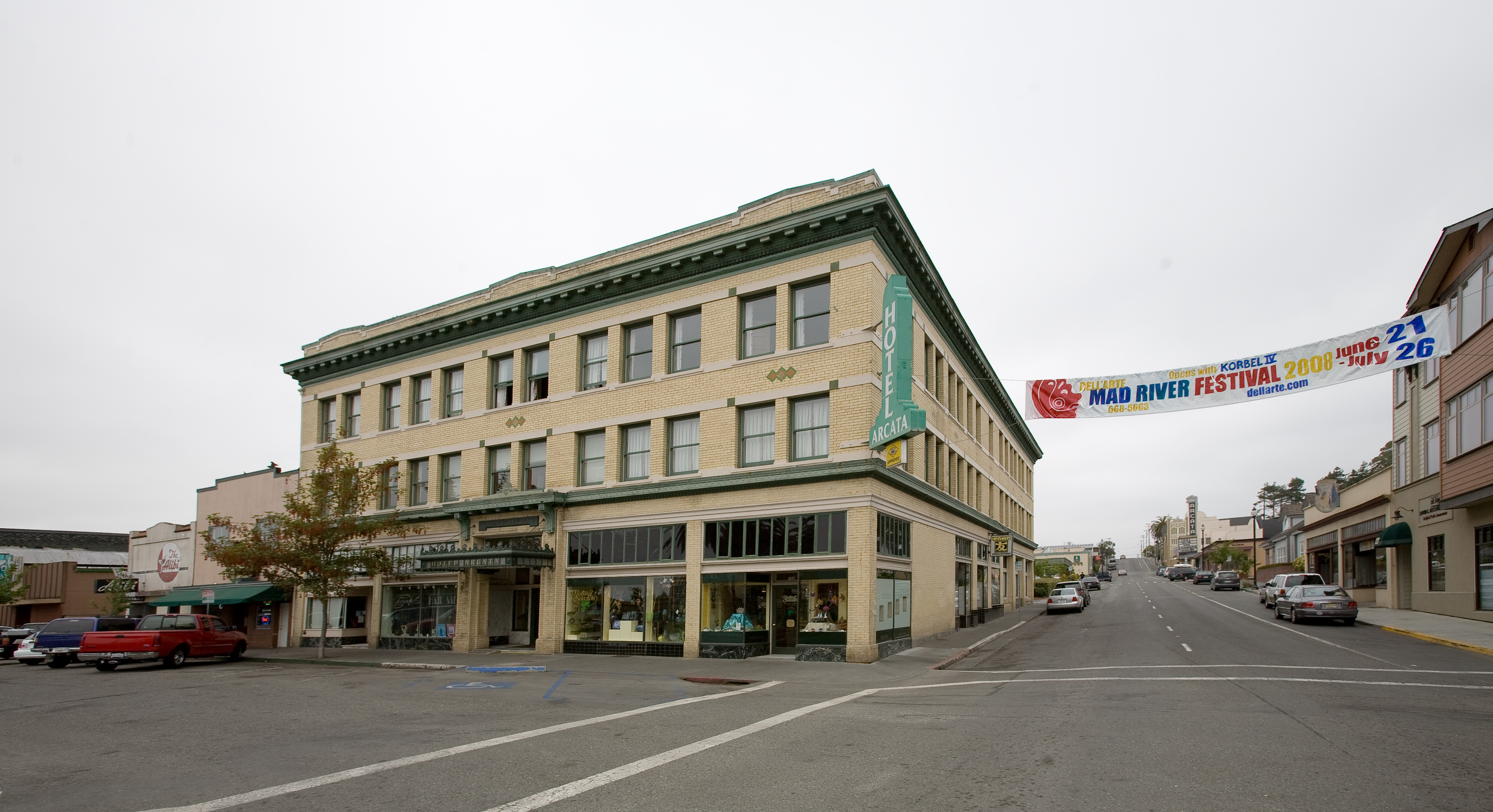

- Location within California Location within the United States
- Location: 708 9th St., Arcata, California
- Coordinates: 40°52′9″N 124°5′5″W
- Built: 1914; 112 years ago
- Architect: W. H. Weeks
- Architectural style: Craftsman period
- NRHP reference No.: 84000775
- Added to NRHP: January 5, 1984

The Hotel Arcata is located in Arcata, California, on the northeast corner of the historic Arcata Plaza. The hotel is on the National Historic Place and was built by W. H. Weeks in 1914 with its grand opening in 1915. It was built to accommodate the increase of visitors that entered Arcata, as methods of travel to Humboldt County expanded as well as the development of Humboldt State Normal School (now California State Polytechnic University, Humboldt.) In 1914 the railroad was completed, and in the early 1920s the Redwood Highway.

The east side of the hotel on the ground floor originally had a restaurant and a barber shop. In 1937-1948, two additional shop entrances were added to the ground floor. Today the hotel continues to operate. The ground floor is continues to hold the lobby, Tomo's Japanese restaurant, Humboldt Outfitters gift shop, and Panaché hair salon. ›

Throughout the hotel's existence, it has undergone small cosmetic changes to fix damage caused by natural disasters and to keep up with modernity. While changes have been made, the hotel remains largely unaltered. The hotel lobby still maintains its original hand-laid tile flooring. If you look close enough, you can find the one error that was made while laying the title pattern. The hotel underwent renovation in the 1980s when it was acquired by the Big Lagoon Rancheria, becoming the first off-reservation Native American-owned hotel in California.

The hotel sits on the Arcata Plaza, surrounded by local restaurants and shops. The plaza also holds lively community activities, including year round weekly farmers markets. During the summertime the plaza is home to many community events, including Oyster Fest, Friday Night Markets, Fair Fest, the Kinetic Race, and more!

== See also ==
- Eureka Inn: another nearby historic hotel
- National Register of Historic Places listings in Humboldt County, California
