= Andrew Mickel =

American convicted of murder on death row

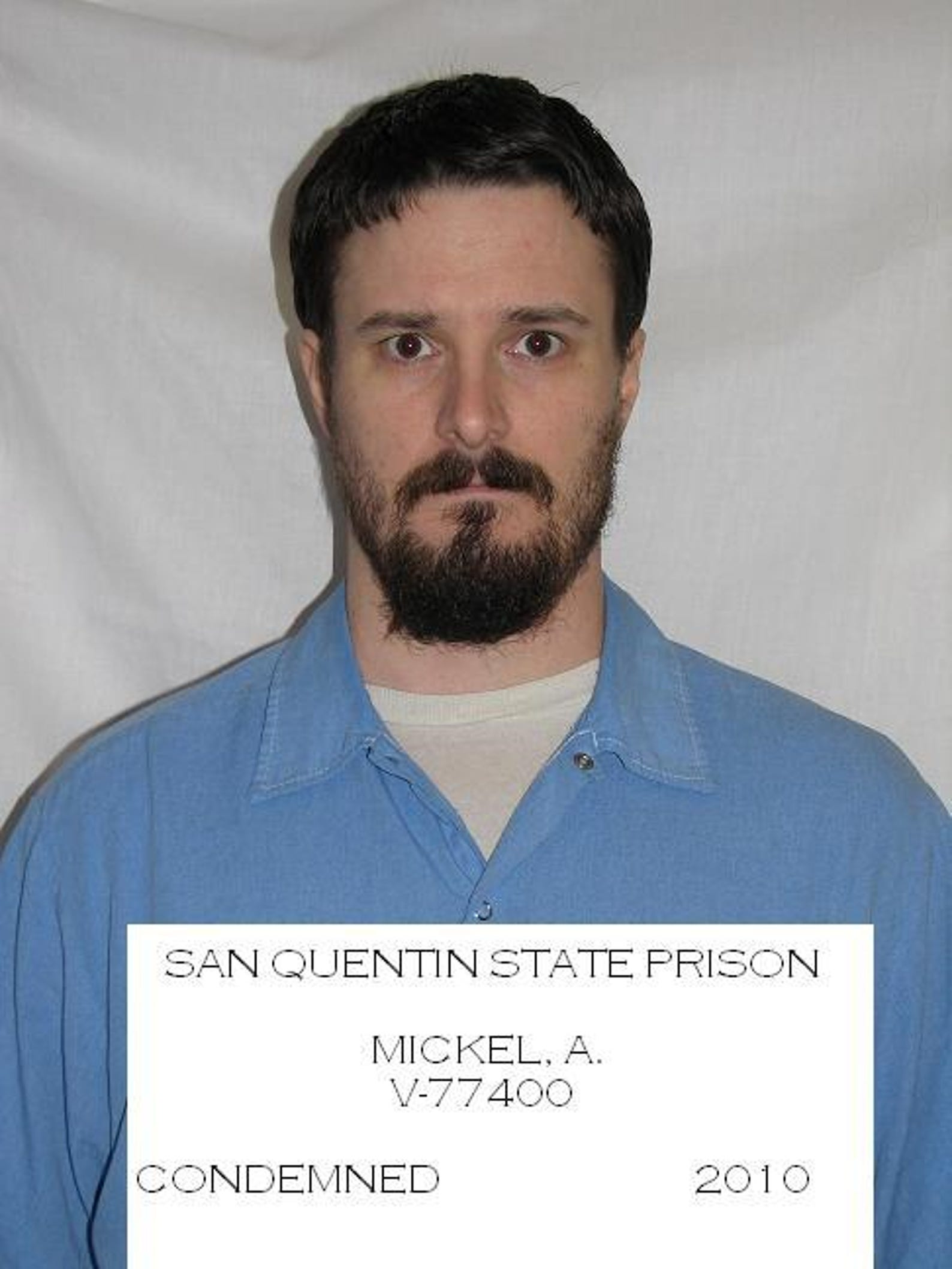
- Born: Andrew Hampton Mickel; March 13, 1979 (age 47); Springfield, Ohio, U.S.
- Other name: Andy McCrae
- Motive: Anti-police sentiment
- Conviction: First degree murder with special circumstances
- Penalty: Death

Details
- Victims: David Mobilio
- Date: November 19, 2002
- Country: United States
- State: California
- Imprisoned at: San Quentin State Prison

Andrew Hampton "Andy" Mickel (born March 13, 1979) is a former resident of Springfield, Ohio. He graduated from Springfield's North High School in 1998. He went on to serve three years with the U.S. Army's 101st Airborne Division before attending Evergreen State College and becoming a journalist with Indymedia.org.

On November 19, 2002, at 1:27 am, Mickel shot and killed Officer David Mobilio of the Red Bluff, California Police Department while gassing up his patrol car. Mobilio was shot twice in the back, and once in the head at "very close range". A handmade "Don't Tread on Us" flag was left beside Mobilio's body. There were no witnesses to the killing, and the crime would have gone unsolved had there not been Internet postings about the crime six days later. The postings read, "Hello Everyone, my name's Andy. I killed a Police Officer in Red Bluff, California in a motion to bring attention to, and halt, the police-state tactics that have come to be used throughout our country. Now I'm coming forward, to explain that this killing was also an action against corporate irresponsibility." It was signed "Andy McCrae", an alias of Mickel's.

Mickel said that "prior to my actions in Red Bluff, I formed a corporation under the name 'Proud and Insolent Youth Incorporated', so that I could use the destructive immunity of corporations and turn it on something that actually should be destroyed." The name is taken from the novel Peter Pan written by Scottish author J. M. Barrie. Mickel wrote, "Just before their final duel and Capt. Hook's demise, Hook said to Peter, 'Proud and insolent youth, prepare to meet thy doom.'

Mickel insisted on representing himself during his trial. His parents have been quoted as referring to their son as Theodore Kaczynski, aka the Unabomber. They say that their son, like Kaczynski, is wrong but mentally ill and should be treated as such.

In April 2005, Mickel was convicted of one count of first-degree murder. He was subsequently sentenced to death and is being held on Death Row at San Quentin State Prison while awaiting his automatic appeal to the California Supreme Court.

In September 2009, The California Supreme Court, declaring that "In California, a criminal defendant has no right to represent himself or herself on appeal," appointed attorney Lawrence A. Gibbs to represent Mickel for his automatic appeal.

On December 19, 2016, the California supreme court upheld Mickel's conviction and sentence.

== See also ==
- List of death row inmates in the United States
