= Odd Fellows Hall (Eureka, California) =

- U.S. National Register of Historic Places
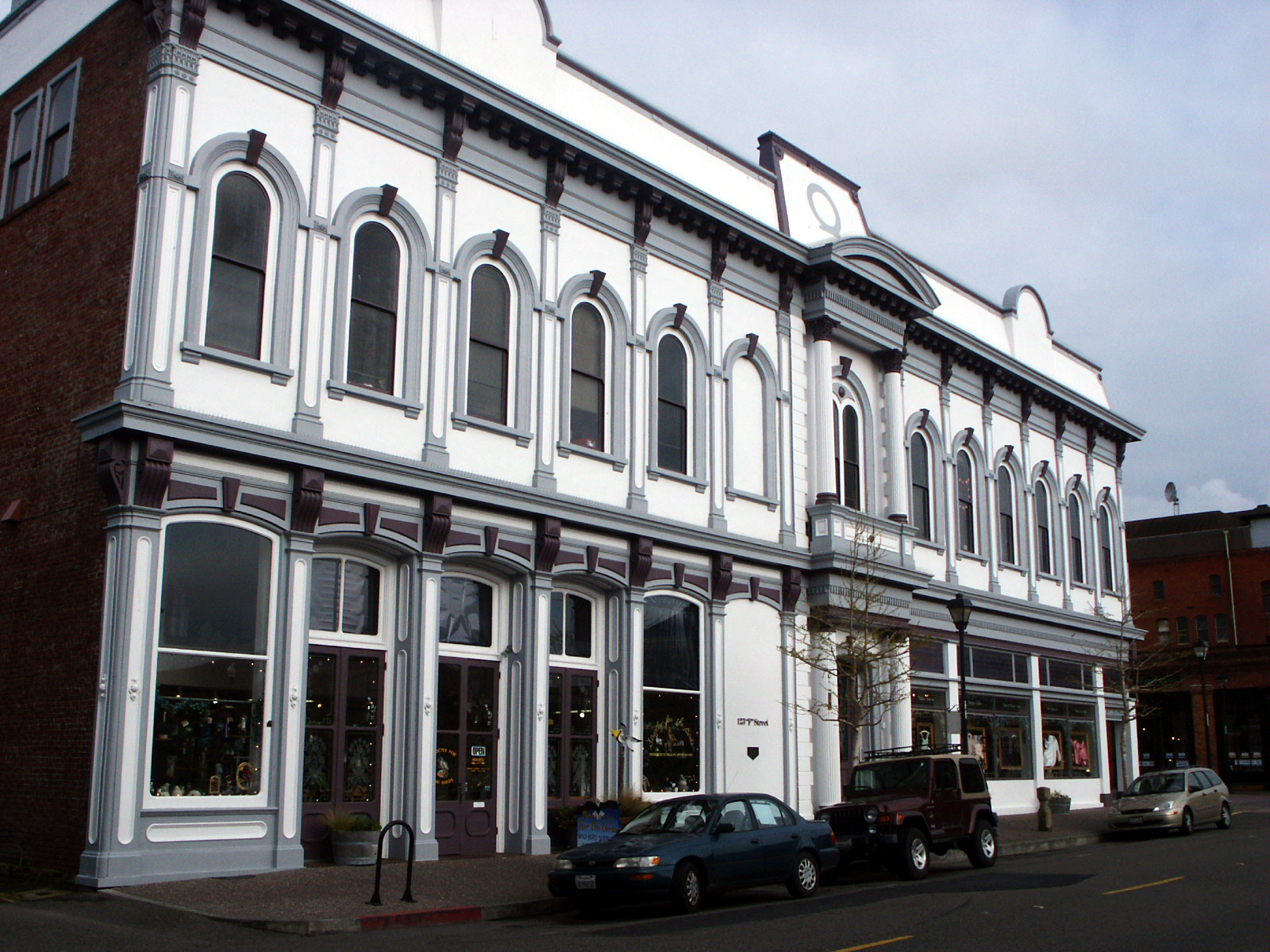

- Location within California Location within the United States
- Location: 123 F St., Eureka, California
- Coordinates: 40°48′16.78″N 124°10′0.12″W
- Area: less than one acre
- Built: 1883
- Architect: Simpson, James
- Architectural style: Second Empire
- NRHP reference No.: 78000673
- Added to NRHP: May 03, 1978

The Odd Fellows Hall in Old Town Eureka, California, also known as the French Empire Mansard Building, is a Second Empire architecture style building built in 1883.

The building served historically as a department store, as a professional building, as a clubhouse, and as a meeting hall for Odd Fellows. It was listed on the National Register of Historic Places in 1978.

== See also ==
- Odd Fellows Building (Red Bluff, California): Another lodge in northern California
- National Register of Historic Places listings in Humboldt County, California
