= Downtown Winters Historic District =

Historic district in California, United States

- Main Street Historic District—Winters
- U.S. National Register of Historic Places
- U.S. Historic district
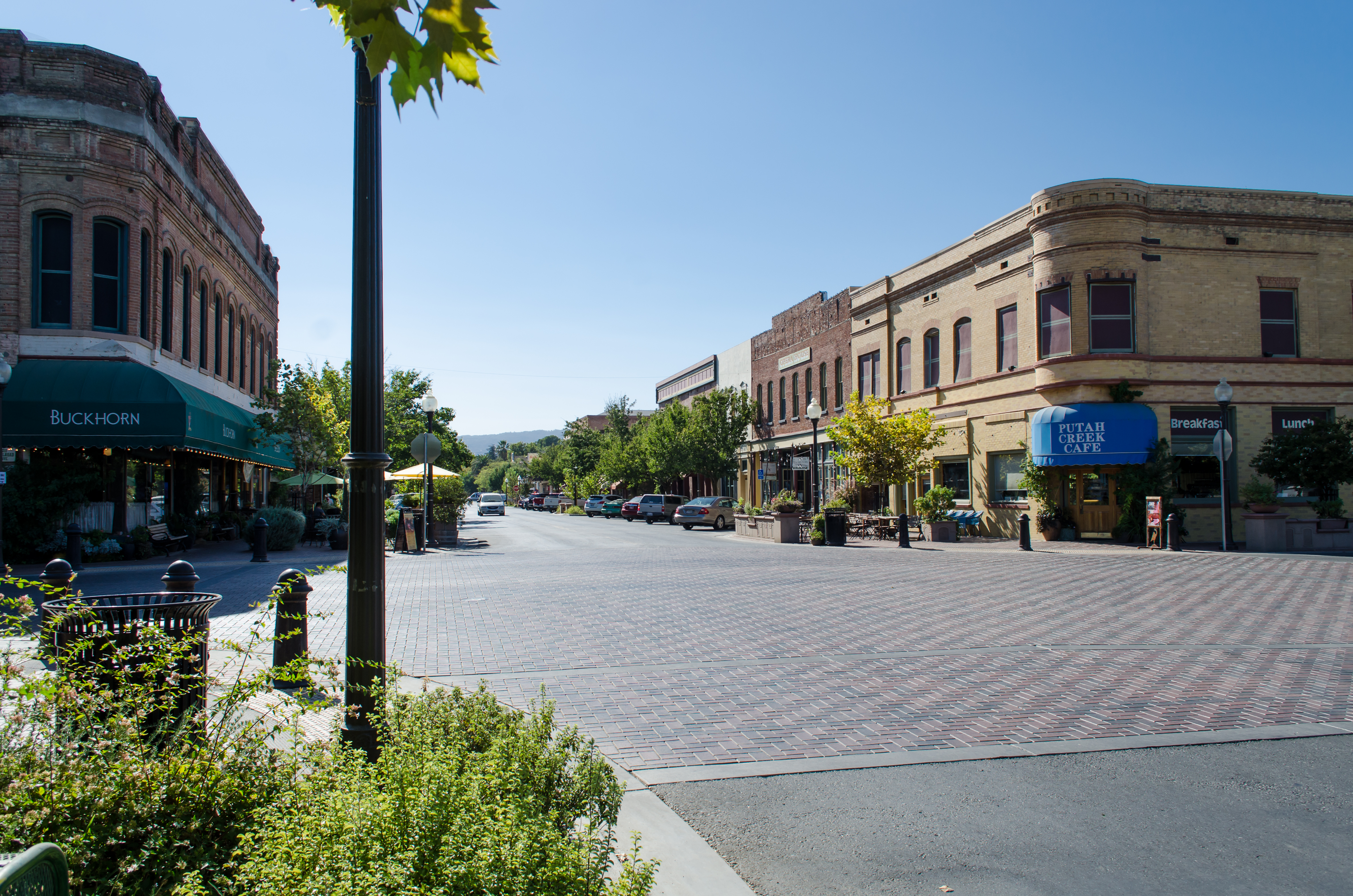

- Location within California Location within the United States
- Location: Winters, California
- Coordinates: 38°31′18″N 121°58′6″W
- Architect: multiple
- Architectural style: Italianate, Queen Anne, Classical Revival
- NRHP reference No.: 96001536
- Added to NRHP: January 2, 1997

The Downtown Winters Historic District, also known as the Main Street Historic District, is a historic district in Winters, Yolo County, California which includes the block of Main Street between Railroad Avenue and First Street. The district is the commercial center of Winters and includes commercial buildings built between the 1870s and 1912. Twenty buildings are included in the district, thirteen of which are contributing buildings. The most prominent building in the district is the DeVilbiss Hotel, which was built in 1899 and designed by A.A. Cook of Sacramento. The Bank of Winters Business Block, a 1904 structure located across from the hotel, is also considered a centerpiece of the district. Two buildings in the district date from the founding of Winters in the mid-1870s: the Opera House and the Chulick Market. The remaining buildings in the district were mainly built in two waves, one in the 1890s and one from 1906 to 1912.

The district was added to the National Register of Historic Places on January 2, 1997.

== Gallery ==
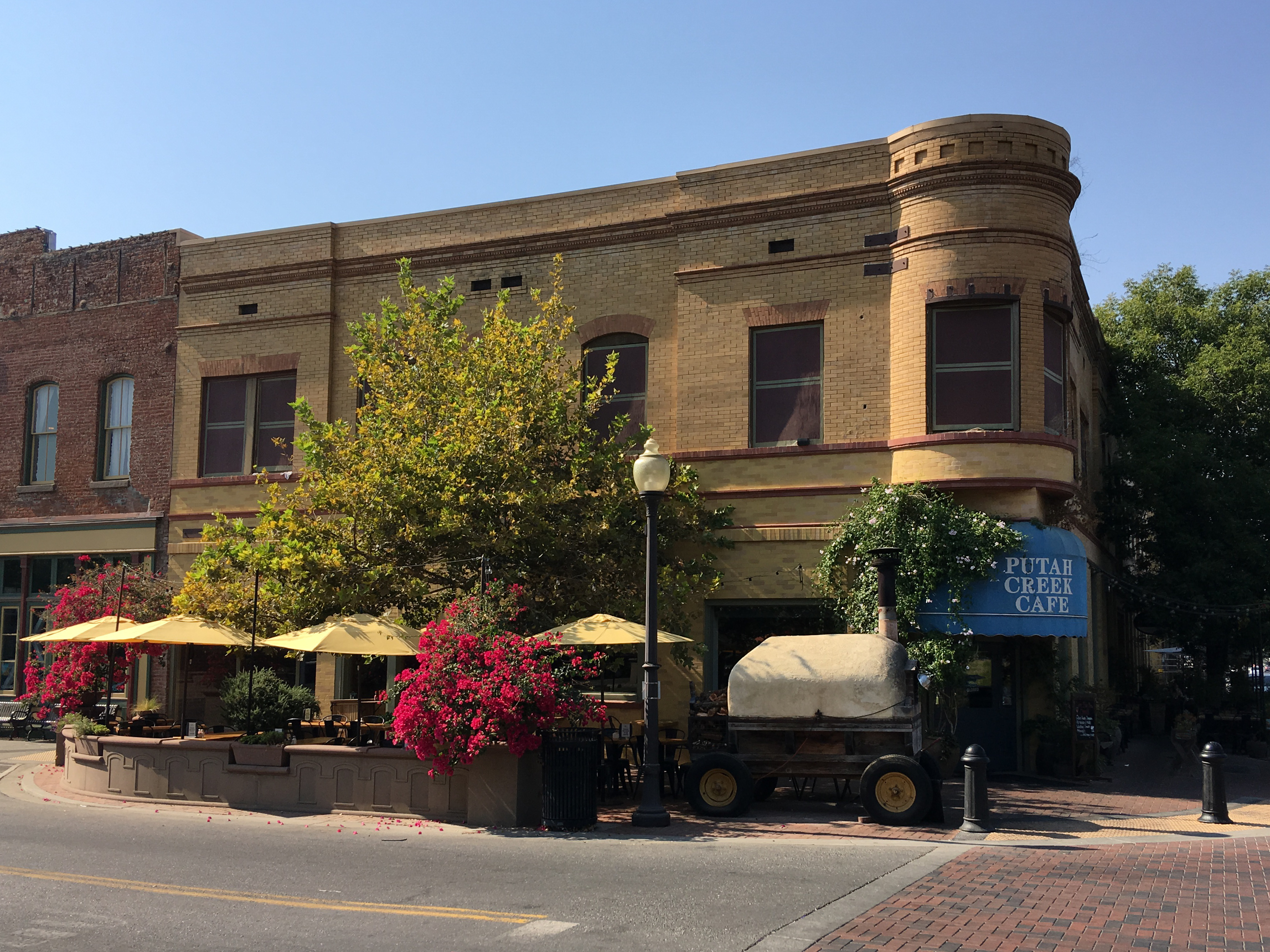
3-5-7 Main St. (Bank of Winters Business Block), built 1904

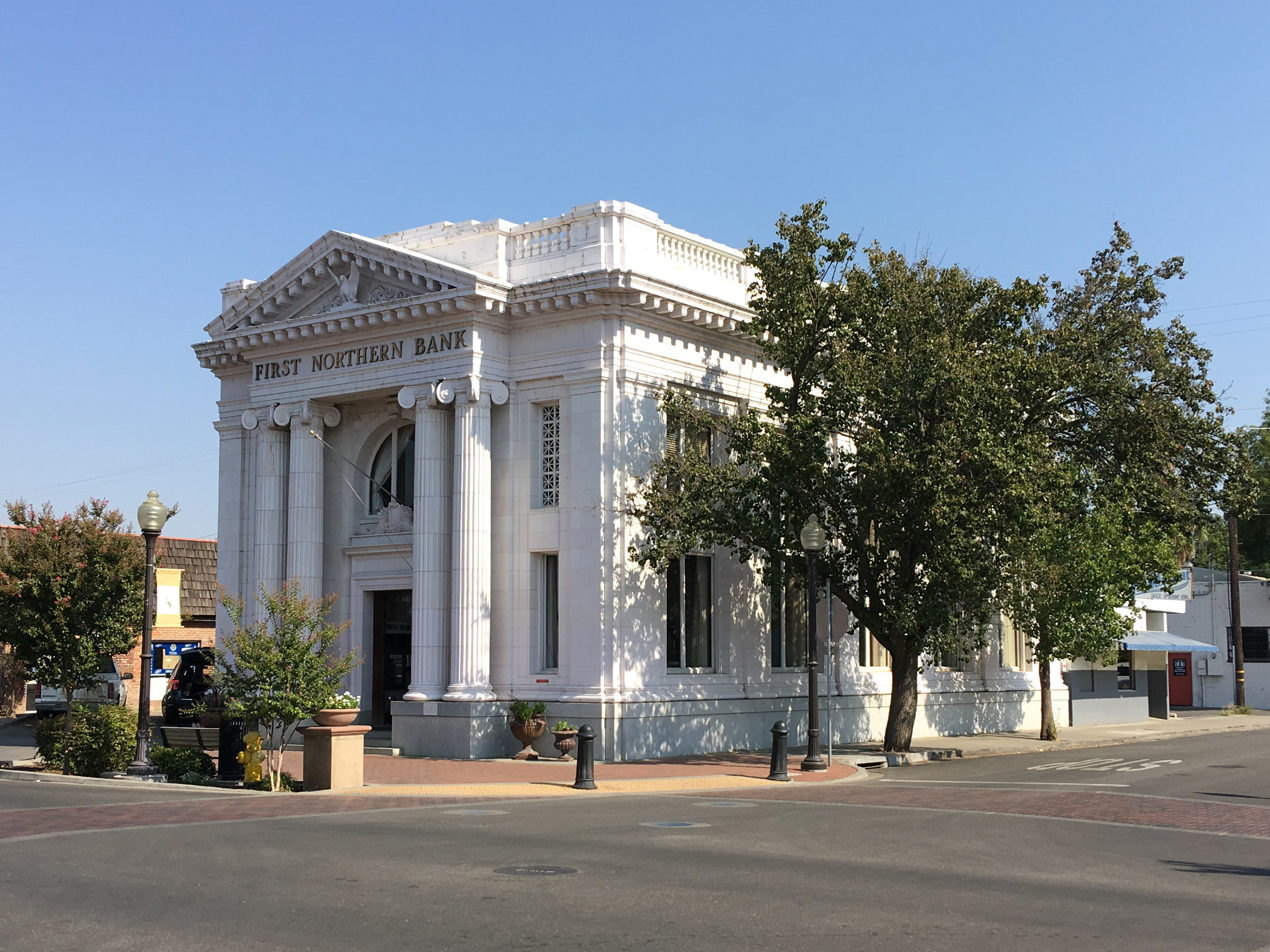
48 Main St. - Citizens Bank (First Northern Bank of Dixon), built 1912
