= Centerville Beach Cross =

Monument to a shipwreck in California

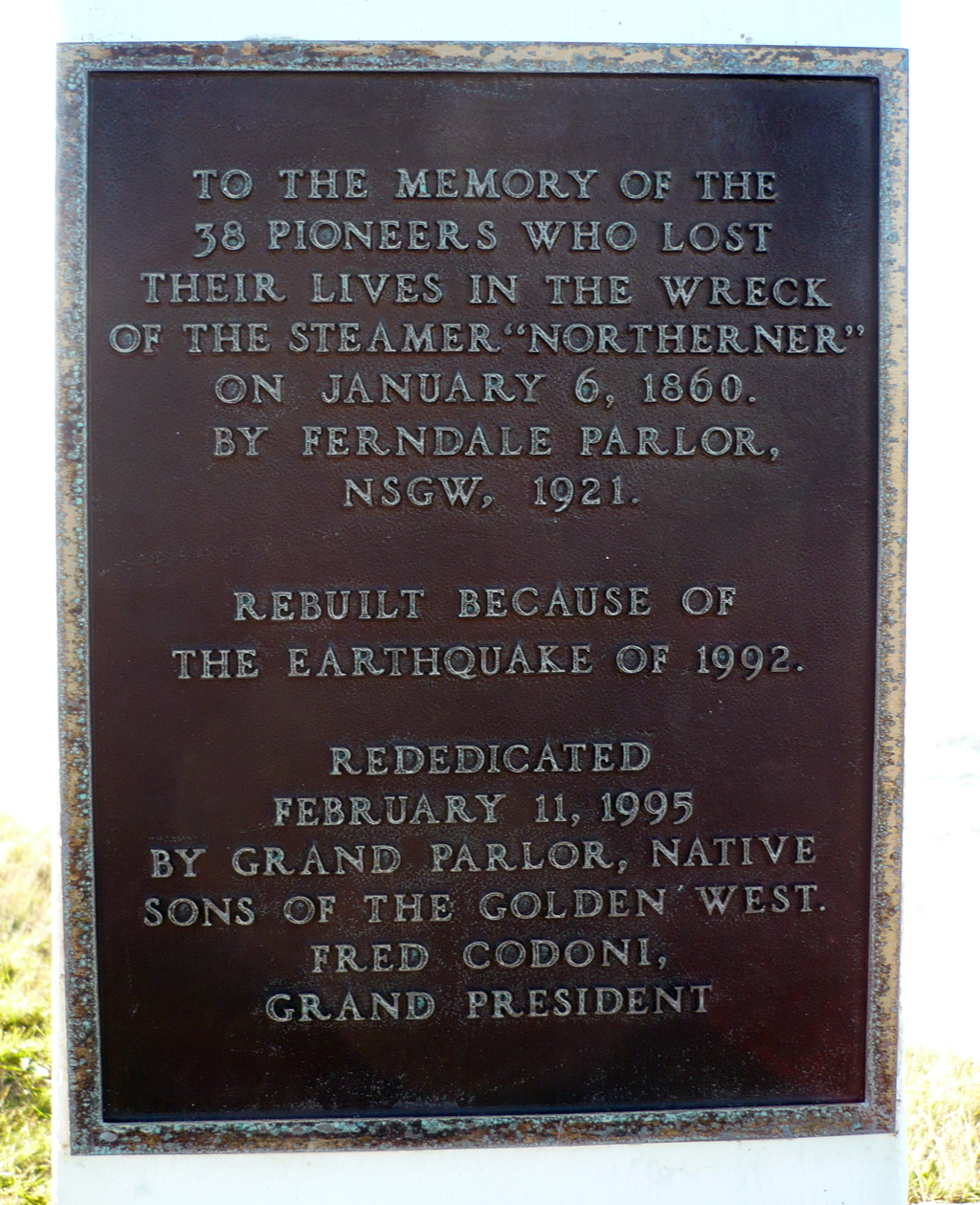
- Centerville Beach Cross Marker, at Centerville Beach, Humboldt County, California

- Location within California
- Location: Humboldt County, California, United States
- Nearest city: Ferndale, California
- Coordinates: 40.5698°N 124.35155°W
- Established: 1921
- Governing body: California Historical Landmarks

California Historical Landmark
- Reference no.: 173

The Centerville Beach Cross is a monument that commemorates the 17 passengers and 21 crew members who died in the shipwreck of the SS Northerner on January 6, 1860. The vessel, owned by the Pacific Mail Steamship Company, struck a rock near Cape Mendocino and wrecked near Centerville Beach, in Humboldt County, California. The monument is registered as California Historical Landmark # 173.

== History ==
The paddle-wheel steamer Northerner, built in New York in 1847, rounded Cape Horn in 1850 and was in active mail service for the next ten years. On January 4, 1860, she left San Francisco on regular route to Victoria and Olympia with the mails. At 4 p.m. on January 5, the ship was sailing in a smooth sea and south winds. Four miles from Cape Mendocino, the steamer passed between the cape and a group of offshore rocks known as Blunt's Reef when a slight bump was felt. On examination, it was found that several planks on the bottom of the ship were scraped off. The captain realized it was impossible to save the ship, and headed to land. Passengers and crew bailed the filling ship while the winds increased to storm levels and a huge surf pounded the beach.

In heavy seas, the ship beached 20 miles below the mouth of Humboldt Bay, about one mile offshore of the village of Centerville.

The first boat over the side, piloted by first officer Mr. A. French was filled with four ladies and four children all of whom arrived safely on shore. The next boat capsized and two of her crew drowned, while another lady on this boat washed to shore and was rescued. The third boat also capsized between the wreck and the beach and four crew were lost.

The chief engineer and two firemen, took the quarter boat, rowed to land and placed a line between land and the wrecked ship. Other boats were filled with passengers and crew, although many of the survivors used the line directly to get to shore. Mr. French took his boat back out to the wreck to save others, but it was stuck in an eddy under the wreck and Mr. French and three of his crew drowned.

The last boat was sent to shore with Mr. O'Neill, the chief engineer, bearing a line. When he reached shore, a larger rope was pulled ashore and passengers tried to follow the line to shore. The force of the surf, however, resulted in most of these washing away, even those who had tried to tie themselves to the line were lost. Others were killed when hit by wreckage being tossed in the heavy waves.

Residents of Centerville helped the injured, taking the ladies to the two buildings of town. In the morning, fourteen dead were found lying on the sands, one female passenger – Miss Gregg who refused to leave her brother – was found still tied to the wheel, and the remaining bodies, including Miss Gregg's brother, were lost to the ocean. All the bodies were buried near the beach.

Local resident and nationally notorious mountain man Seth Kinman was alerted by distress signals from the Northerner. In the raging gale, Kinman tethered himself to the shore and waded into the surf to save many passengers. Later, he was hailed as a hero and awarded a Bible and free life-time passage on Pacific Mail Steamships.

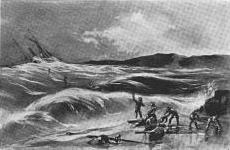
Artist conception of survivors on shore watching others float from the wrecked steamship, "Northerner."

Of the 108 on board initially, 38 drowned of whom 17 were passengers and 21 crew. Passengers lost included the Gregg siblings and Frank Blomfield, a son of the late Bishop of London, Charles James Blomfield. Officers and crew lost included first officer French, river pilot Mr. Gladwell, Mr. Barry (who, despite not being able to swim, saved many lives and died a hero), third officer Mr. Mayhood, nine of the steward's crew, one fireman, one coal passer, five sailors, the carpenter and one man working his passage.

Thirty-eight passengers, including five of six women and all four children on board, were saved as were 32 crew members including Captain Dall and his favorite cabin boy who also saved 500 dollar coins. Six passengers who refused to leave the ship were carried ashore alive on wreckage. The survivors were cared for at Centerville until the next day, when the steamer Columbia, also owned by the Pacific Mail Steamship Company, took the survivors and the 45 recovered bags of mail northward. Property lost on the steamer included 13 bags of mail and $14,000 in U.S. Government funds.

== Monument ==
As described on the bronze plaque on the monument, in 1921, the Ferndale Parlor of the Native Sons of the Golden West placed a cross and marker on the hill overlooking Centerville Beach. The first marker was destroyed in the 1992 Cape Mendocino earthquakes. A new marker was placed and rededicated on February 11, 1995.
