= De-No-To Cultural District =

Historic district in California, United States

- U.S. National Register of Historic Places
- U.S. Historic district
- Nearest city: Hoopa, California
- Area: 3,035 acres (1,228 ha)
- NRHP reference No.: 85000901
- Added to NRHP: April 24, 1985

The De-No-To Cultural District, also known as the Trinity Summit Area, is a Hupa cultural site near Hoopa, California. The area serves as a religious site for the Hupa, and the people still conduct religious ceremonies at sites in the district. Studies of the area have found rock circles with scenic views, hearths used for various ceremonial purposes, and cairns. Trails and resting points in the district were also used for religious purposes. In addition to its religious function, the area has been used for grazing livestock.

The district was added to the National Register of Historic Places on April 24, 1985.
