= George McFarlan House =

Historic house in California, United States

- U.S. National Register of Historic Places
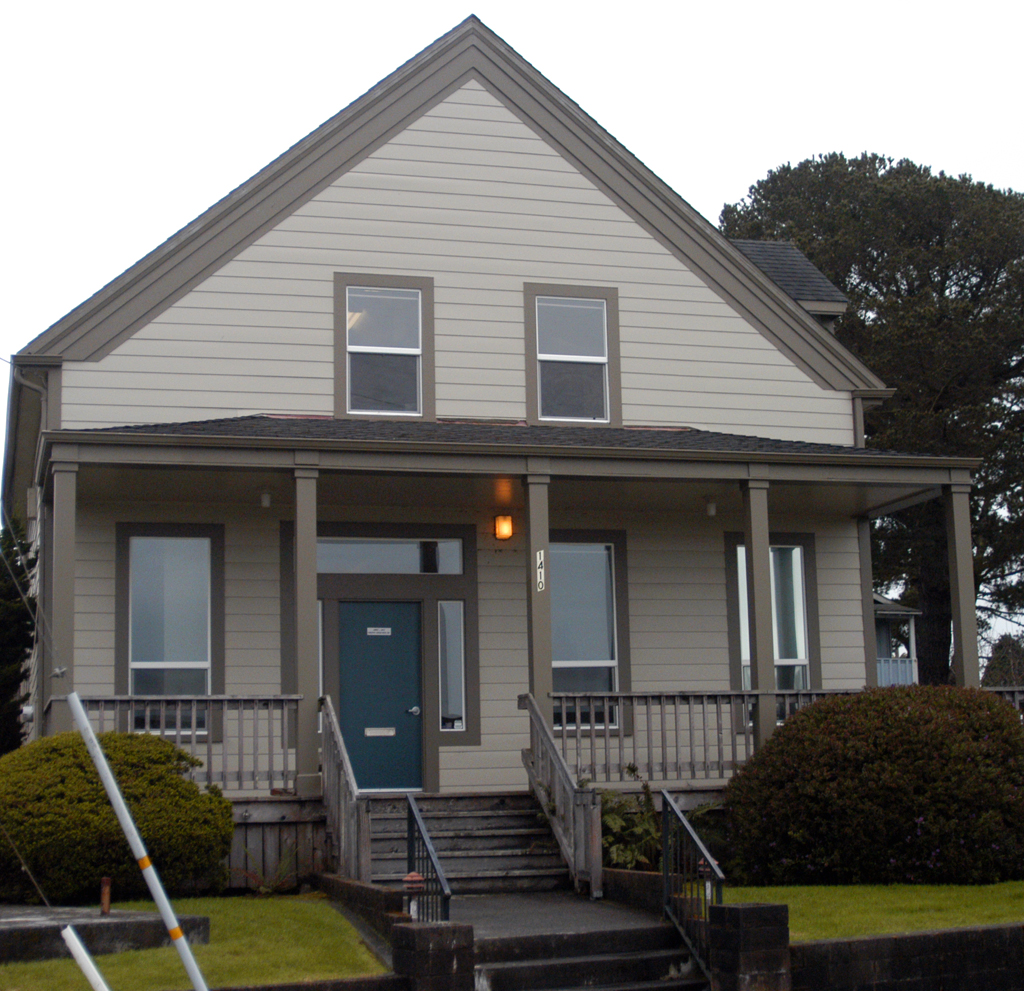
- George McFarlan House

- Location within California Location within the United States
- Location: 1410 Second Street, Eureka, California
- Coordinates: 40°48′22″N 124°9′20″W
- Architectural style: Greek Revival
- NRHP reference No.: 78000672
- Added to NRHP: 15 November 1978

The George McFarlan House, built around 1857 at 1410 Second Street, is one of the oldest remaining houses in Eureka, California, United States. It is listed on the National Register of Historic Places.

== Architecture ==
The boards of the house are numbered suggesting it was either brought to Eureka in pieces to be constructed or had been assembled somewhere else before being rebuilt at its current location.

The style is Greek Revival, although its facade has been altered to its current appearance. An Italianate wing and porch were added in the late 1880s. The building was reconstructed without the Italianate additions following a fire in 1982. At present the facade retains the upstairs original Greek Revival fenestration, while the first floor retains the four across pattern of the Italianate remodeling. Early photos show three windows with a centered doorway and two windows above to have been the original facade.

== George McFarlan ==
George McFarlan (b. c. January 1821 - d. 25 December 1875) was an early pioneer to Humboldt County arriving with a group of Canadians from New Brunswick that included Willam Carson whose sister later married another McFarlan.

Like many other newcomers to the area, they sought gold first, working for a group from Arkansas to dam the Trinity River about ten miles from Weaverville to divert the flow to an old channel revealing a three-quarters of a mile long dry bed of riffled gold and pebbles in the summer of 1850. As with McFarlan, most of the Canadian laborers on the dam went on to become the leading men of Humboldt County.

After the gold fields, McFarlan came to Eureka and purchased large tracts of redwood timbered land, in an area south of Myrtle Avenue, to feed a saw mill that he built and operated, and once owned the land, but did not log it, that would become Eureka's Sequoia Park. McFarlan street is in his former holdings. McFarlan and his wife, Catharine A. McFarlan, lived in the home on Second street at the time it was built. He was found drowned in Humboldt Bay, 24 December 1875.
