= E. Janssen Building =

- Janssen, E., Building
- U.S. National Register of Historic Places
- U.S. Historic district – Contributing property
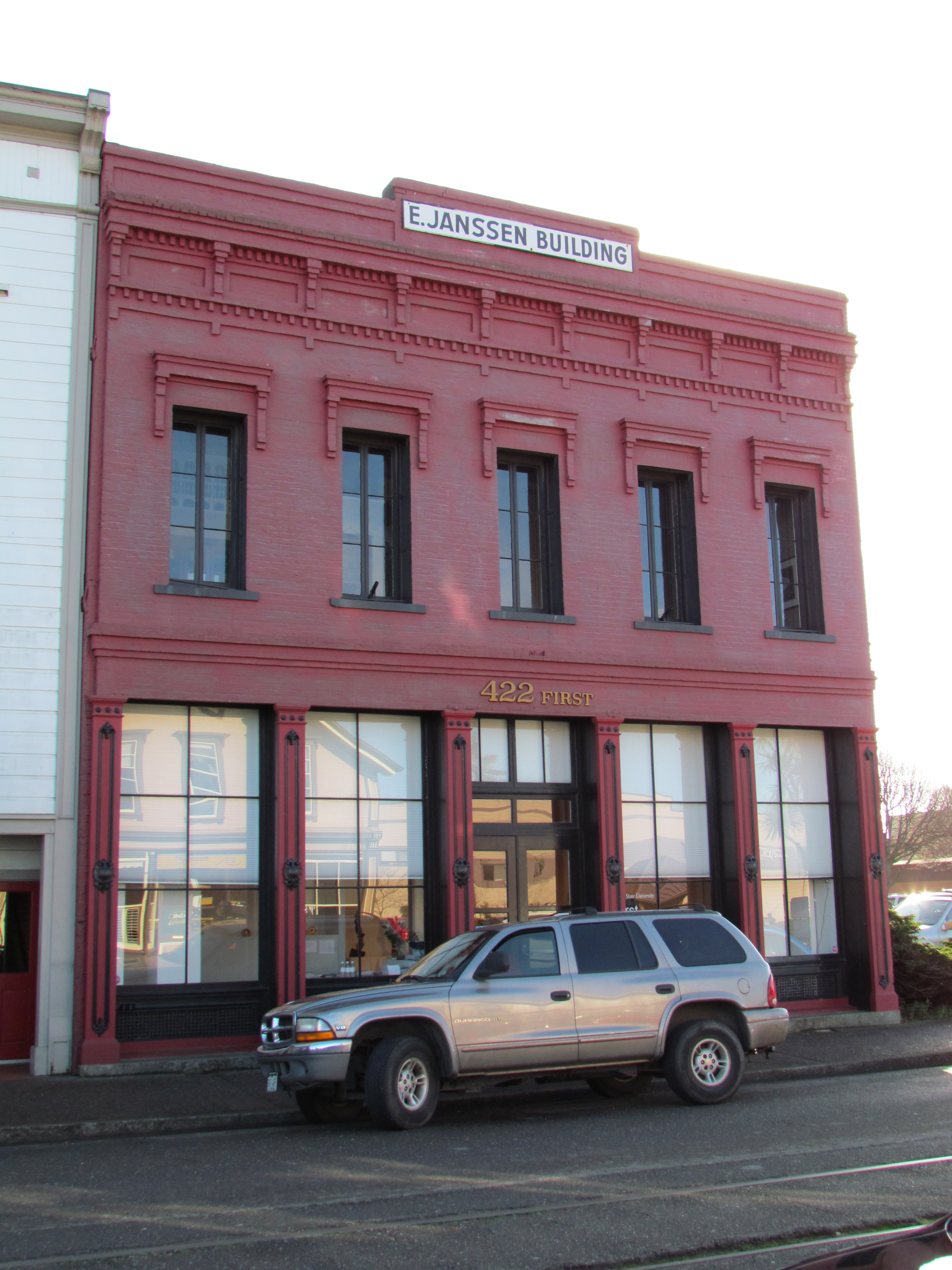

- Location within California
- Location: 422 1st St., Eureka, California
- Coordinates: 40°48′18″N 124°9′59″W
- Area: 0.1 acres (0.040 ha)
- Built: 1875
- Architectural style: Italianate/California Renaissance
- Part of: Eureka Old Town Historic District (ID91001523)
- NRHP reference No.: 73000402
- Added to NRHP: July 16, 1973

The E. Janssen Building at 422 First Street, Eureka, California, is a two-story Italianate commercial building. It was built in 1875 to be a hardware and general merchandise store. In 1973, it was the first building in Eureka to be placed on the United States National Register of Historic Places, and it was listed as a contributing property of the National Register Old Town Eureka Historical District in 1991. From 1998 to 2016, the building housed the HSU First Street Gallery, an art gallery run by Humboldt State University.

== History ==
=== Janssen's ===
The building was built in 1875 as a hardware and general merchandise store. The building is two stories; all four sides have brick walls on a brick foundation. The interior construction is wood framing and wooden floors. The exterior has an Italianate cast iron facade featuring six cast iron pilasters capped with simple classic capitals which separate the large glass windows of the storefront. Each half column was cast bearing the words "San Francisco Iron Works 1875." The storefront has four large windows, two on each side of a large double entry door surmounted by a transom light. The front window sills are granite. The rear delivery entrance had a sectioned wooden door with metal shutters and no first floor windows.

Five deeply recessed windows are spaced along the second story elevation at the front, but only three at the rear. In 1973, both front and rear windows retained the original cast iron shutters which had been lost from the lower windows by that time. The front facade wall above the windows is decorated with dentil courses and corbels in the brickwork. Above the decorative brickwork is a recessed panel bearing a signboard which reads "E. Janssen Building." Common to other loft-type commercial construction of the time, both floors feature open spaces, divided only by a row of support pillars in the middle of each floor. The interior is minimally decorated but retains its water-operated hydraulic elevator from its historic use as a general store.

The first floor front was the display sales area for general merchandise, the first floor rear had groceries and office space. The second floor was used for stock storage, hence the elevator, which was the first one in northern California. After 14 years in business in this building, Janssen's moved to 521 Third Street where they continued to sell hardware.

=== H.H. Buhne's ===
In 1889, Janssen's sold the building to Hans Henry Buhne (1822 – October 26, 1894), who was the first to pilot a boat of settlers across Humboldt Bay bar in 1850 as part of the Laura Virginia Company. Buhne had many and varied business interests; he started the first hotel in Eureka, ran tugboats over the bar, and built or owned several other local buildings. He was also vice president and director of the first bank in Eureka, a major investor in railroads and timberlands, and an active partner in the largest sawmill of the time. He built his first store on First Street in 1864.

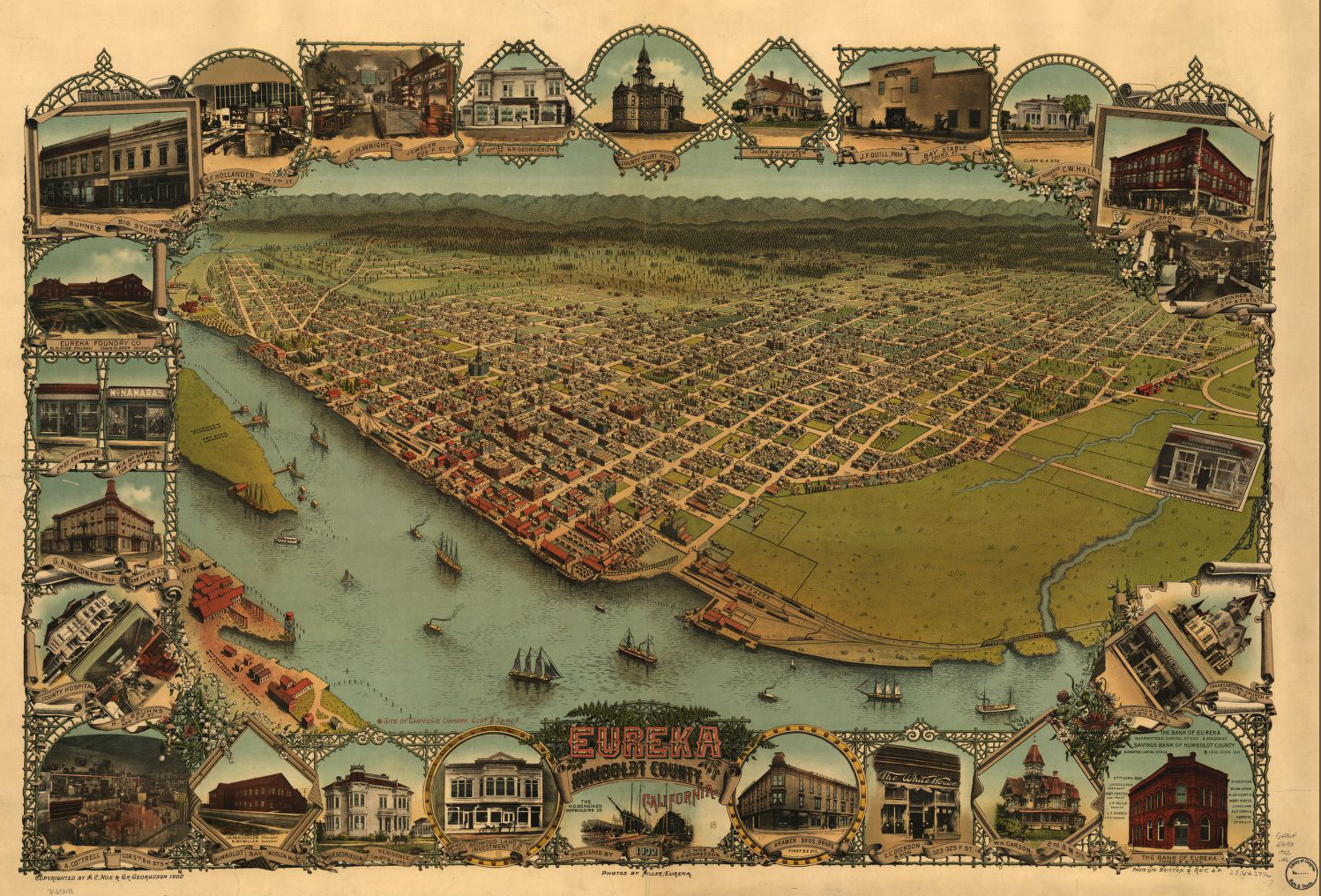
1902 map/perspective of Eureka: Inset #1 at upper left hand corner is "Buhne's Big Store", in the Janssen Building at 422 1st Street.

Outgrowing the first building in just five years, in 1869 Buhne built another building at 423 First Street adjacent to his previous store. The earlier building is gone but the later one survives. Both stores were across the street from Janssen's at 423 First Street.

Besides the stores on First Street, Buhne was in partnership from 1865 to 1868 with L.C. Schmidt and Company although his name did not appear on the business until after Schmidt died in 1868. The partnership sold supplies both in Eureka and Petrolia, where they provisioned the nascent oil industry.

Schmidt had been dead 21 years when Buhne attached the Janssen building to his holdings, renamed it Buhne's Big Store, and converted the first floor to a ship's chandlery. Buhne added decorative balconies accessed by curving stairs to the first floor space which the local Humboldt Times newspaper described as Steamboat Gothic. Buhne also placed his Big Store sign over Janssen's on the front facade upper niche and another sign reading Buhne Company on the beam over the storefront windows. Buhne's Big Store was in business after Buhne died until at least until 1902 when it appears on the Eureka Bird's Eye View of that year.

=== Humboldt Cultural Center ===
In 1971, the building was a wholesale plumbing supply. By 1972 the building was vacant. In 1973, the new owner applied for the building to be placed on the National Register of Historic Places. In 1973, the E. Janssen building was the first building in Eureka added to the National Register of Historic Places. It was later declared a contributing property of the Old Town Eureka Historical District.

=== First Street Gallery ===
From 1998 to 2016, the Janssen building housed Humboldt State University's First Street Gallery which hosted art shows and gallery openings. In 2016, the gallery moved to a Third Street location in Old Town before closing in 2018.
