= The Old Arrow Tree =

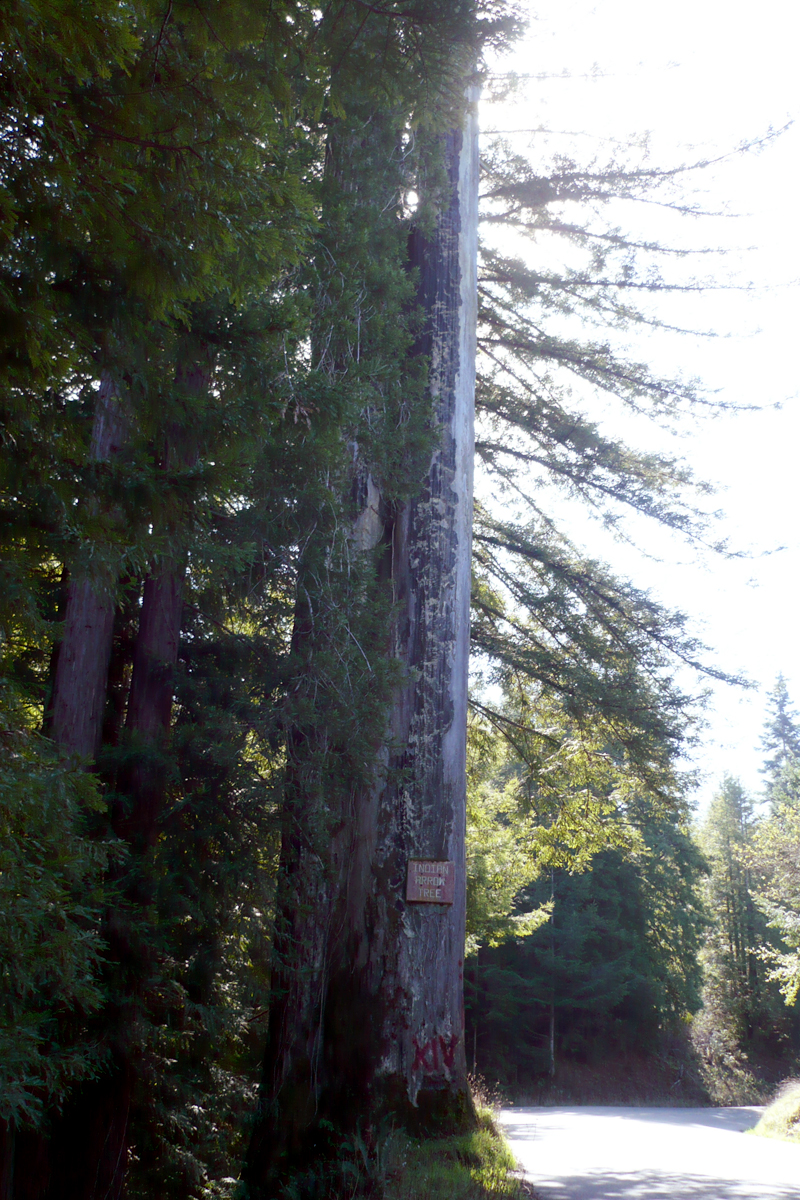

- Location within California
- Location: Humboldt County, California, USA
- Nearest city: Blue Lake, California
- Coordinates: 40°52′0.7″N 123°57′0.57″W
- Governing body: private

California Historical Landmark
- Official name: Old Arrow Tree
- Designated: 1935-11-01
- Reference no.: 164

The Old Arrow Tree is California Historical Landmark Number 164. For many years, people placed twigs, arrows or feathers into the bark of the tree as they passed. There are two suggestions of why there were so many arrows in the tree. One story says that the Indians respected this tall, straight redwood, calling it a great warrior and that shooting it was a form of respect. The other tale is that it marks war between the Hoopa and Korbel tribes. The Korbel won and afterwards Indians passing the tree would put an arrow into it, to show they arrived in peace.

There is no official marker at this location.
