= Humboldt Bay Woolen Mill =

- U.S. National Register of Historic Places
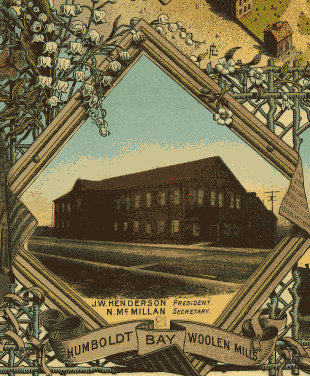
- The mill was one year old when it was included on the Illustrated Map issued in 1902.

- Location within California Location within the United States
- Location: 1400 Broadway, Eureka, California
- Coordinates: 40°47′37″N 124°10′39″W
- Area: 1.3 acres (0.53 ha)
- Built: 1920
- Built by: W. J. Little
- Architectural style: Greek Revival
- NRHP reference No.: 82002182
- Added to NRHP: June 25, 1982

Humboldt Bay Woolen Mill manufactured woolen cloth from 1901 to after World War II in Eureka, California. The mill was listed as a National Historic Monument but demolished by the City of Eureka in 1987.

== History ==
When the Humboldt Bay Woolen Mill was built in 1901, the company was capitalized to $100,000 by several local businessmen, including the timber mill owner William Carson, the sheep rancher Hugh Webster McClellan, and the rancher Robert Porter, who continued as vice-president of the newly formed company. According to the 1902 Illustrated Map of Eureka, the other officers included J. W. Henderson, president, and N. McMillan, secretary.

The mill manufactured woolen fabrics from 1901 until it closed after World War II. After sitting empty for many years, it was listed on the National Register on 25 June 1982, but it survived only five more years. After the city designated it a dangerous building in 1987, local preservationists and the Eureka Heritage Society tried to get funding to rehabilitate it, but it was torn down in the same year.

The mill was described as an excellent example of Greek Revival architecture and one of the few industrial buildings in Eureka historically not associated with timber or fishing. Some architectural features of the mill were saved by historians before the demolition. The site is currently a chain pharmacy, a grocery store and parking. The destruction of this building rallied community activists to save other historically significant structures in Eureka.
