= Jacoby Building =

Historical Landmark in Arcata, California, United States

- U.S. National Register of Historic Places
- California Historical Landmark
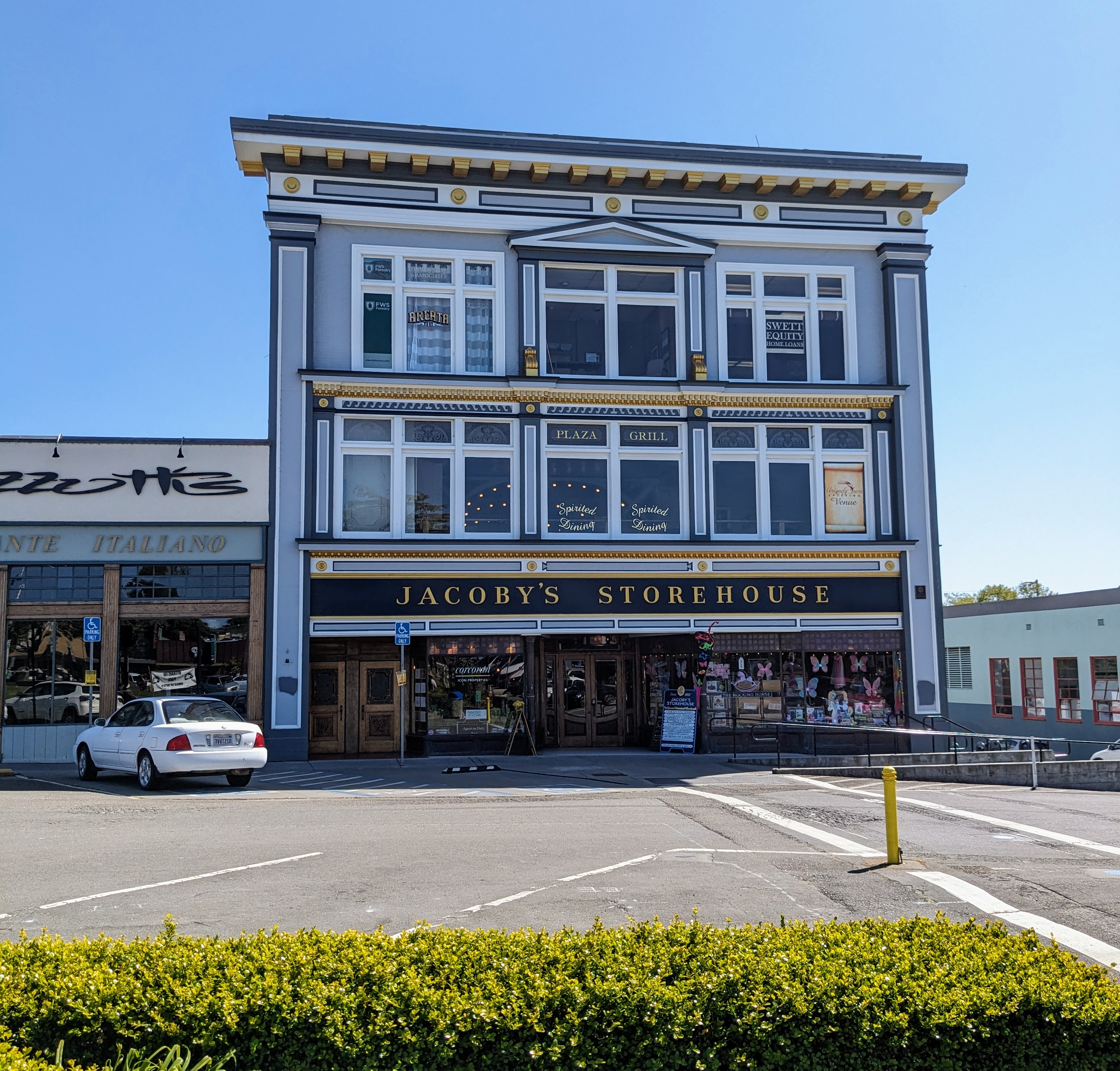
- Jacoby Building

- Location within California Location within the United States
- Location: 791 8th Street, Arcata, California
- Coordinates: 40.868°N 124.086°W
- Built: 1857, 1907
- Architect: Warren Porter Skillings
- Architectural style: Classical revival
- NRHP reference No.: 82002179

Significant dates
- Added to NRHP: June 17, 1982
- Designated CHISL: 783

The Jacoby Building, also known as Jacoby's Storehouse, is a historical building in Arcata, Humboldt County, California. It is the only original historical building in Arcata.

It was built in 1857, in the Classical revival style, for Augustus Jacoby, an early pioneer who arrived in Arcata in 1850. He started in business by taking supplies to the local miners on pack animals. Jacoby operated a general store and a hotel.

The Jacoby Building was built of brick and stone, and thus survived the 1875 fire that swept through the adjacent Arcata Plaza area. Jacoby sold the building to Alexander Brizard in 1880, who would clad the building in cement and replace its original 3-doorway facade with a modern plate glass storefront. A number of general stores operated out of the building, continuing to supply goods to mining camps in the Klamath and Trinity Mountains. The building was largely rebuilt in 1907 by Brizard with Eureka architect Warren Porter Skillings, where the building's footprint was more than doubled and the top two floors were added. Portions of the original brick and stone structure, originally concealed by stucco during the reconstruction, are currently visible along H street around the basement openings.

In 1963, the Jacoby Building became California Historical Landmark (CHL) #783. The building was added to the National Register of Historic Places (#82002179) in 1982.

The building was used for shelter during conflicts with the Native American Wiyot tribe from 1858 through 1864, which included the 1860 Wiyot massacre. The CHL plaque controversially described the Jacoby Building as having "served periodically as a refuge in time of Indian troubles."

The plaque was in one corner of the Arcata Plaza, a park across the street from the Jacoby Building. For years the Plaza also had an 8.5-foot bronze statue of President William McKinley (1843-1901), forged in San Francisco in 1906. McKinley's imperialist politics and hostility to Native Americans, as well as the unfortunate wording on the CHL plaque, for years led to calls to remove both the statue and the plaque from the Plaza. Acts of vandalism were one of the reasons for a 2018 City Council vote to remove the statue, as well as the plaque.

== See also ==
- California Historical Landmarks in Humboldt County
