= Red Bluff, California =

City in California, United States

City of Red Bluff
- City
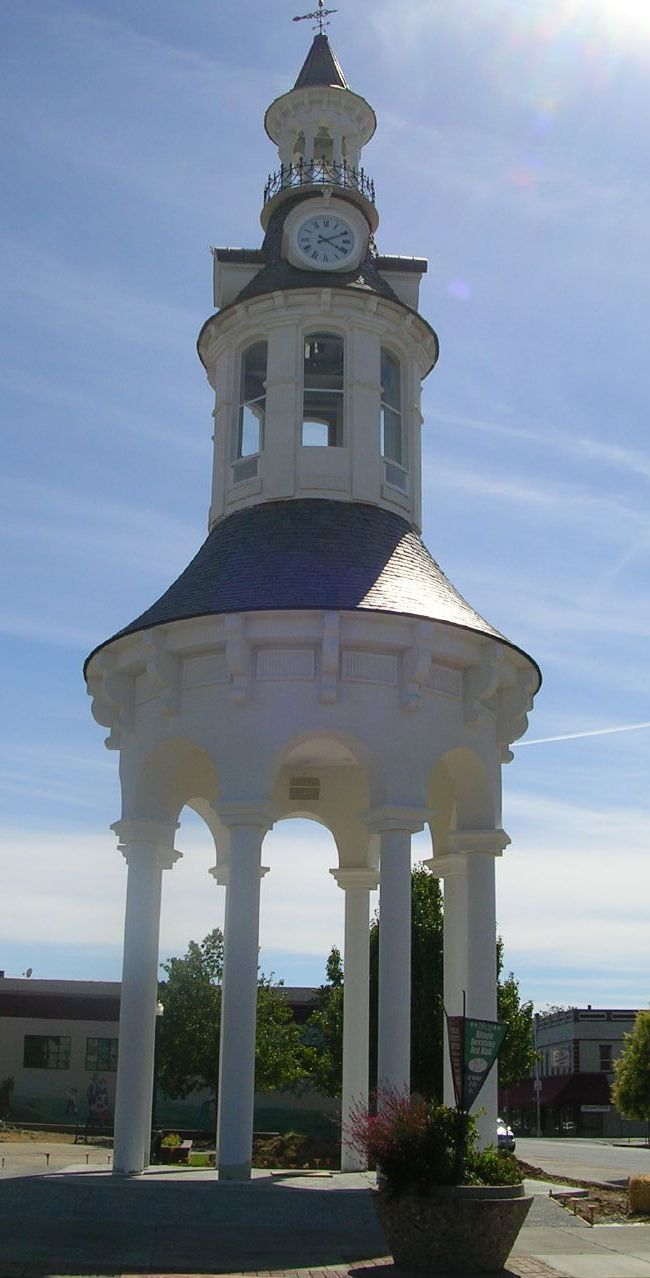
- Cone & Kimball Plaza clocktower, known as the "Center of the City"
- Motto: "A Great Place To Live"
- Interactive map of City of Red Bluff
- Location in the United States City of Red Bluff (California)
- Coordinates: 40°10′36″N 122°14′17″W
- Country: United States
- State: California
- County: Tehama
- Incorporated: March 31, 1876

Area
  - City: 7.68 sq mi (19.88 km^{2})
  - Land: 7.56 sq mi (19.58 km^{2})
  - Water: 0.12 sq mi (0.30 km^{2}) 1.48%
- Elevation: 305 ft (93 m)

Population (2020)
  - City: 14,710
  - Density: 1,946/sq mi (751.3/km^{2})
  - Urban: 18,434
- Time zone: UTC−8 (Pacific (PST))
  - Summer (DST): UTC−7 (PDT)
- ZIP code: 96080
- Area code: 530, 837
- FIPS code: 06-59892
- GNIS feature IDs: 277581, 2411527
- Website: Official website

Red Bluff is a city in and the county seat of Tehama County, California, United States. Its population was 14,710 at the 2020 census, up from 14,076 at the 2010 census.

It is located 131 miles (211 kilometers) north of Sacramento, 31 mi (50 km) south of Redding, and it is bisected by Interstate 5. Red Bluff is situated on the banks of the upper Sacramento River where a Historic Chinatown District was established on October 29, 2022. As early as 1852, four years after the first contingent of Chinese arrived in California to work the gold mines during the California Gold Rush, a Chinatown was created to serve the growing population arriving at the last steamboat stop known as Head of Navigation in Red Bluff, California. Located in the northernmost part of California’s Central Valley, the city marks the northern end of a vast contiguously cultivated area that extends all the way to Bakersfield, 400 mi (640 km) to the south. Mildly rugged terrain, used as rangeland, separates Red Bluff from the next crop areas to the north in Cottonwood.

It was originally known as Leodocia, but was renamed to Covertsburg in 1853, then its current name in 1854. Located at the head of navigation on the Sacramento River, the town flourished in the mid- to late 19th century as a landing point for miners heading to the Trinity County gold fields and later as a temporary terminus for the Southern Pacific Railroad's northward expansion.

== Geography ==
Red Bluff is on the northern edge of the Sacramento Valley, and is the third-largest city in the Shasta Cascade region. It is approximately 31 mi (50 km) south of Redding, 40 mi (64 km) northwest of Chico, and 131 mi (211 km) north of Sacramento.

The city is located at 40°10′36″N 122°14′17″W (40.176640, −122.237951). According to the United States Census Bureau, the city has a total area of 7.7 sq mi (20 km^{2}), of which 7.6 sq mi (20 km^{2}) is land and 0.1 sq mi (0.26 km^{2}) (1.48%) is water.

== History ==
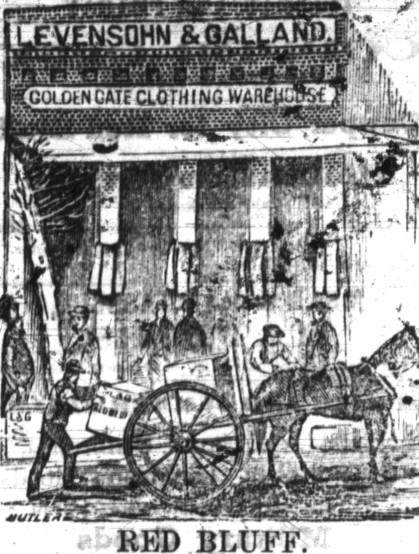
Etching of Levensohn & Galland Building, 1864

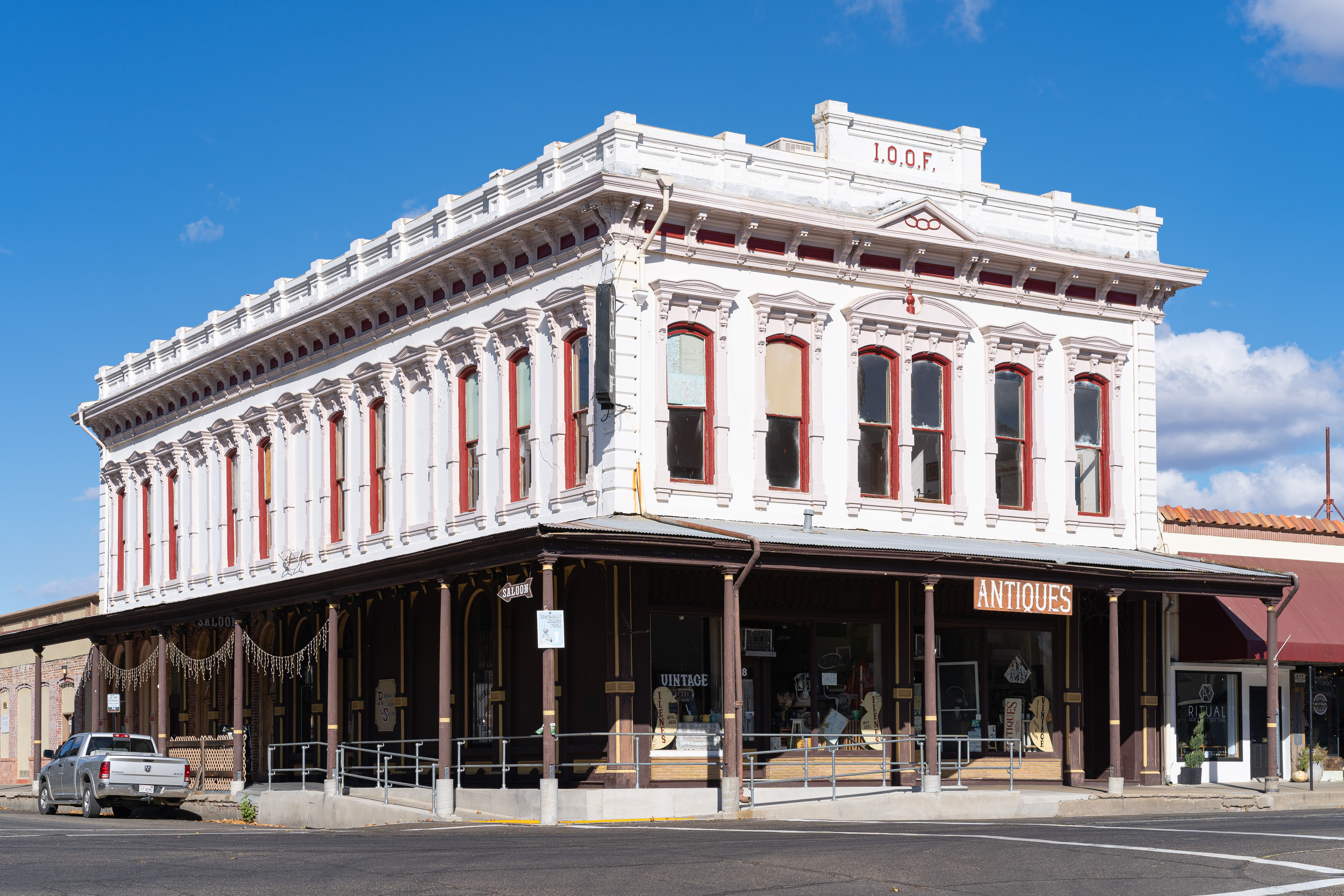
Odd Fellows Building in downtown Red Bluff (2020)

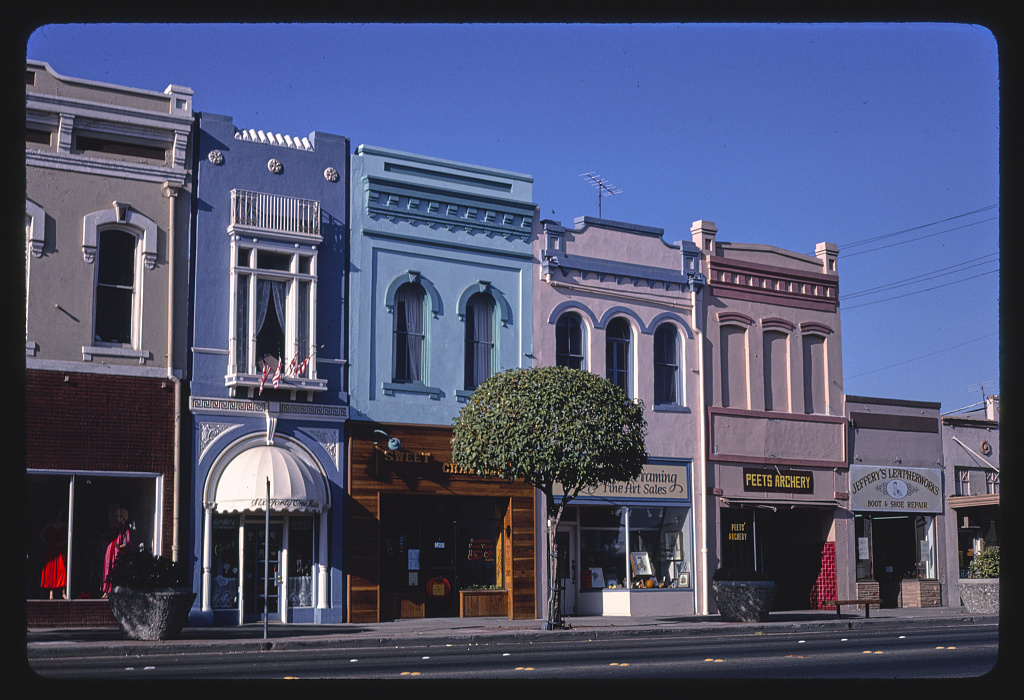
Main Street stores, 1987

In the early 19th century, the Siskiyou Trail was the main north-south path connecting Northern California and Southern Oregon first used by the Native Americans and later fur trappers and hunters. The first European to settle the northern Sacramento Valley in what was then Alta California was Peter Lassen, who in 1844 was granted the 24,000-acre (97 km^{2}) Rancho Bosquejo tract from the Mexican government near present-day Vina, about 20 mi (32 km) southeast of Red Bluff. There, he proposed to establish a town, but his attempts were thwarted when the California gold rush stole the focus of the settlers he had gathered in Missouri. Regardless, the publicity from his colonization efforts attracted new settlers to the valley. In the late 1840s, riverboat traffic began expanding northward along the Sacramento River. Lassen's initial attempt to navigate to his ranch in 1849 had failed, but the following year, a riverboat managed to make the arduous 125-mile (201 km) journey from Sacramento in 5 months before ultimately being sunk.

The discovery of gold near Yreka, California, in 1851 brought a new rush northward and settlers soon flooded the area, looking for the quickest route to the gold fields. A site on the Sacramento River just north of Reeds Creek was determined to be the river's navigable head, and a small community soon sprung up around the important landing. First known as Leodocia then Covertsburg, by the time a post office was established on October 17, 1853 residents had settled on the name Red Bluff, in recognition of the titular geographical features once prominent along the banks of the Sacramento River. The first postmaster was Samuel Bishop.

Tehama County was created in 1856 and Red Bluff was chosen as the seat of the new county. By 1859, the first permanent courthouse was constructed.

As early as 1854, committees were brought together at Red Bluff to plan a railroad route connecting California to southern Oregon through the Siskyou Mountains via Nobles Pass. The railroad finally reached Red Bluff in 1872, and for a few years, it was the terminus, increasing the town's wealth greatly. In the 1880s, White supremacists in Red Bluff began an ethnic-cleansing campaign against the Chinese residents but failed several times. In February 1886, thousands of Whites in the "Anti-Coolie League" marched on Chinatown and went from house to house, ordering the occupants to leave within 10 days but the Chinese community refused by calling on prominent White merchants who supported their labor and merchant stores. Tunnel and expulsion folklore has since plagued the Chinatowns history with rumors the Chinese population had been expelled or that the Chinatown was burned.

Growth slowed by the late 1880s, when the railroad was continued north towards Redding, but riverboat commerce continued well into the 20th century. Mining was largely replaced by agriculture, and Red Bluff remained a vital shipping point by rail and eventually highway.

On June 27, 2020, a local Walmart distribution center was the site of a workplace shooting, in which one employee was killed and another four were wounded. The shooter, identified as a former employee, was then killed by responding police officers.

== Climate ==
Red Bluff has a Mediterranean climate (Köppen: Csa) with cool, wet winters and hot, dry summers. An average of 100.1 days annually have highs of 90 °F (32.2 °C) or higher and an average of 21.5 days with lows of 32 °F (0 °C) or lower. The record highest temperature was 121 °F (49.4 °C) on August 7, 1981, and the record lowest temperature was 17 °F (−8.3 °C) on January 9, 1937. Annual precipitation averages 23.21 inches (589.5 mm) with measurable precipitation falling on an average of 71 days. The wettest "rain year" was from July 1994 to June 1995 with 45.96 in (1,167.4 mm) and the driest from July 1975 to June 1976 with 10.17 in (258.3 mm). The most rainfall in one month was 21.47 in (545.3 mm) in January 1995 and the most rainfall in 24 hours was 3.55 in (90.2 mm) on January 8, 1995. The most snowfall in one month was 15.0 in (38 cm) in January 1937. On February 24, 2023, Red Bluff received a rare 6 in (15 cm) of snowfall.

Climate data for Red Bluff, California (Red Bluff Municipal Airport), 1991–2020 normals, extremes 1933–present
Month	Jan	Feb	Mar	Apr	May	Jun	Jul	Aug	Sep	Oct	Nov	Dec	Year
Record high °F (°C)	80 (27)	86 (30)	92 (33)	98 (37)	108 (42)	117 (47)	119 (48)	121 (49)	118 (48)	107 (42)	93 (34)	83 (28)	121 (49)
Mean maximum °F (°C)	69.8 (21.0)	74.3 (23.5)	80.7 (27.1)	87.8 (31.0)	97.7 (36.5)	106.9 (41.6)	110.2 (43.4)	107.5 (41.9)	104.7 (40.4)	94.6 (34.8)	79.8 (26.6)	68.4 (20.2)	111.9 (44.4)
Mean daily maximum °F (°C)	56.5 (13.6)	60.8 (16.0)	65.7 (18.7)	71.9 (22.2)	81.6 (27.6)	90.8 (32.7)	98.0 (36.7)	96.2 (35.7)	91.4 (33.0)	79.0 (26.1)	64.2 (17.9)	55.7 (13.2)	76.0 (24.4)
Daily mean °F (°C)	47.4 (8.6)	50.8 (10.4)	54.7 (12.6)	59.6 (15.3)	68.0 (20.0)	76.4 (24.7)	82.0 (27.8)	79.9 (26.6)	75.4 (24.1)	65.1 (18.4)	53.4 (11.9)	46.8 (8.2)	63.3 (17.4)
Mean daily minimum °F (°C)	38.2 (3.4)	40.8 (4.9)	43.7 (6.5)	47.3 (8.5)	54.5 (12.5)	62.0 (16.7)	66.0 (18.9)	63.6 (17.6)	59.3 (15.2)	51.3 (10.7)	42.3 (5.7)	37.8 (3.2)	50.6 (10.3)
Mean minimum °F (°C)	28.1 (−2.2)	30.6 (−0.8)	33.4 (0.8)	36.4 (2.4)	43.9 (6.6)	52.1 (11.2)	57.7 (14.3)	56.0 (13.3)	50.3 (10.2)	41.0 (5.0)	31.8 (−0.1)	27.2 (−2.7)	25.0 (−3.9)
Record low °F (°C)	17 (−8)	21 (−6)	26 (−3)	28 (−2)	33 (1)	42 (6)	51 (11)	50 (10)	41 (5)	30 (−1)	24 (−4)	13 (−11)	13 (−11)
Average precipitation inches (mm)	4.71 (120)	4.15 (105)	2.91 (74)	1.55 (39)	1.25 (32)	0.44 (11)	0.06 (1.5)	0.05 (1.3)	0.19 (4.8)	1.04 (26)	2.54 (65)	4.23 (107)	23.12 (587)
Average precipitation days (≥ 0.01 in)	10.3	9.5	9.7	6.6	5.4	2.4	0.3	0.6	1.1	4.0	7.4	11.0	68.3
Source 1: NOAA
Source 2: National Weather Service

== Demographics ==
Historical population
Census	Pop.	Note	%±
1870	992		—
1880	2,106		112.3%
1890	2,608		23.8%
1900	2,750		5.4%
1910	3,530		28.4%
1920	3,104		−12.1%
1930	3,517		13.3%
1940	3,824		8.7%
1950	4,905		28.3%
1960	7,202		46.8%
1970	7,676		6.6%
1980	9,490		23.6%
1990	12,363		30.3%
2000	13,147		6.3%
2010	14,076		7.1%
2020	14,710		4.5%
U.S. Decennial Census; 1850–1870 1880–1890; 1900 1910 1920; 1930 1940 1950; 1960 1970 1980; 1990 2000 2010

=== 2020 census ===
As of the 2020 census, Red Bluff had a population of 14,710 and a population density of 1,945.5 inhabitants per square mile (751.2/km^{2}). The census reported that 97.7% of the population lived in households, 1.1% lived in non-institutionalized group quarters, and 1.2% were institutionalized. 98.3% of residents lived in urban areas, while 1.7% lived in rural areas. The median age was 35.3 years. 26.1% of residents were under the age of 18, 9.2% were aged 18 to 24, 26.2% were aged 25 to 44, 21.5% were aged 45 to 64, and 16.9% were 65 years of age or older. For every 100 females, there were 92.3 males, and for every 100 females age 18 and over, there were 87.8 males age 18 and over.

There were 5,755 households, of which 33.8% had children under the age of 18 living in them. Of all households, 33.3% were married-couple households, 10.2% were cohabiting-couple households, 20.9% were households with a male householder and no spouse or partner present, and 35.6% were households with a female householder and no spouse or partner present. About 31.2% of all households were made up of individuals, and 14.9% had someone living alone who was 65 years of age or older. The average household size was 2.5. There were 3,488 families (60.6% of all households).

There were 6,114 housing units at an average density of 808.6 units per square mile (312.2 units/km^{2}), of which 5,755 (94.1%) were occupied and 5.9% were vacant. Of occupied units, 43.1% were owner-occupied and 56.9% were occupied by renters. The homeowner vacancy rate was 2.9%, and the rental vacancy rate was 4.5%.

Racial composition as of the 2020 census
Race	Number	Percent
White	10,239	69.6%
Black or African American	159	1.1%
American Indian and Alaska Native	555	3.8%
Asian	230	1.6%
Native Hawaiian and Other Pacific Islander	37	0.3%
Some other race	1,702	11.6%
Two or more races	1,788	12.2%
Hispanic or Latino (of any race)	3,597	24.5%

=== 2023 ACS estimates ===
In 2023, the US Census Bureau estimated that 6.5% of the population were foreign-born. Of all people aged 5 or older, 87.3% spoke only English at home, 11.1% spoke Spanish, 0.2% spoke other Indo-European languages, 1.3% spoke Asian or Pacific Islander languages, and 0.1% spoke other languages. Of those aged 25 or older, 86.6% were high school graduates and 12.9% had a bachelor's degree.

The median household income in 2023 was $50,216, and the per capita income was $40,159. About 15.4% of families and 17.6% of the population were below the poverty line.

=== 2010 census ===
At the 2010 census, Red Bluff had a population of 14,076. The population density was 1,833.6/sq mi (708.0/km^{2}). The racial makeup of Red Bluff was 11,366 (80.7%) White, 128 (0.9%) African American, 438 (3.1%) Native American, 187 (1.3%) Asian, 16 (0.1%) Pacific Islander, 1,168 (8.3%) from other races, and 773 (5.5%) from two or more races. Hispanics or Latinos of any race were 3,037 persons (21.6%). The census reported that 13,637 people (96.9% of the population) lived in households, 150 (1.1%) lived in noninstitutionalized group quarters, and 289 (2.1%) were institutionalized.

Of the 5,376 households, 2,033 (37.8%) had children under 18 living in them, 1,969 (36.6%) were opposite-sex married couples living together, 1,022 (19.0%) had a female householder with no husband present, 404 (7.5%) had a male householder with no wife present, 537 (10.0%) were unmarried opposite-sex partnerships, and 27 (0.5%) were same-sex married couples or partnerships. Also, 1,629 households (30.3%) were one person, and 678 (12.6%) had someone living alone who was 65 or older. The average household size was 2.54. There were 3,395 families (63.2% of households); the average family size was 3.11.

The age distribution was 3,950 people (28.1%) under 18, 1,534 people (10.9%) were 18 to 24, 3,561 people (25.3%) were 25 to 44, 3,157 people (22.4%) were 45 to 64, and 1,874 people (13.3%) were 65 or older. The median age was 32.2 years. For every 100 females, there were 92.4 males. For every 100 females 18 and over, there were 87.7 males.

The 5,872 housing units had an average density of 764.9/square mile, of the occupied units 2,277 (42.4%) were owner-occupied and 3,099 (57.6%) were rented. The homeowner vacancy rate was 3.5%; the rental vacancy rate was 7.3%. 5,652 people (40.2% of the population) lived in owner-occupied housing units and 7,985 people (56.7%) lived in rental housing units.

== Top employers ==
According to the city's 2022 Annual Comprehensive Financial Report, these are the top 10 employers:

#	Employer	Number of employees
1	County of Tehama	756
2	Saint Elizabeth Community Hospital	610
3	Walmart	340
4	Tehama County Department of Education	285
5	Red Bluff Union Elementary School District	261
6	Red Bluff High School District	213
7	City of Red Bluff	144
8	The Home Depot	140
9	PJ Helicopters	180
10	Raley's Supermarkets	85

== Events ==
- In late 1984, Colleen Stan was found to have been kept as a sex slave in a Red Bluff home since 1977, without anyone outside her abductors’ household knowing.
- On November 19, 2002, Andrew Mickel shot and killed Officer David Mobilio of the Red Bluff Police Department in an attempt to make a political statement against "corporate irresponsibility" and the government's "police-state tactics".

== Newspapers ==
- Red Bluff Daily News
- The Redding Record Searchlight publishes a weekly publication called "Tehama Today" for Red Bluff residents. It is included in the Sunday editions of the Record Searchlight.

== Notable people ==
- Clancy Barone (born 1963), football player, offensive line coach for the National Football League (NFL)
- Mary Brown, widow of John Brown the Abolitionist, and her family lived in Red Bluff from 1864 until 1870
- Chuck Cecil (born 1964), former NFL safety
- Michael Chiarello (1962–2023), celebrity chef
- Alvin Aaron Coffey Sr. (1822–1902) African American pioneer, homesteader, miner, and farmer in California; who was formerly enslaved
- Jim Davis (1924–1995) Major League Baseball (MLB) pitcher for the Giants, Cubs, and Cardinals
- Shane Drake, award-winning music video and film director
- Clair Engle (1959–1964), former United States Senator, was known as "the Pride of Red Bluff"
- Jesse Freitas Sr. (1921–2020), football player.
- Al Geiberger (born 1937), golfer, 1966 PGA Championship winner, born in Red Bluff
- Gale Gilbert (born 1961), NFL quarterback
- Margaret Glaspy, singer-songwriter
- Leo Gorcey (1917–1969), stage and movie actor
- Marv Grissom (1918–2005) baseball player and coach, MLB player
- Jim Hanks (born 1961), voice and character actor (brother of Tom Hanks)
- William B. Ide (1796–1852), who joined the Bear Flag Revolt and was named president of the California Republic
- Roy Joiner (1906–1989), baseball player, MLB pitcher of 1930s
- Bill Redell (born 1941), former Occidental College quarterback and College Football Hall of Fame member
- Swede Risberg (1894–1975), baseball player banned after Black Sox Scandal, died in Red Bluff
- Robert Shaw, choral conductor
- Rob K. Henderson (born 1990), political commentor and author
