= Pleasants Ranch =

- Pleasants-Hoskins Ranch
- U.S. National Register of Historic Places
- U.S. Historic district
- Location within California Location within the United States
- Location: 8212 Pleasants Valley Road
- Nearest city: Vacaville, California
- Coordinates: 38°27′54″N 122°2′52″W
- Area: 4.5 acres (1.8 ha)
- Architect: A.A. Cook
- Architectural style: Late Victorian, Queen Anne
- Website: www.joyfulranch.org
- NRHP reference No.: 06000280
- Added to NRHP: April 7, 2006

Pleasants Ranch or Hoskins Ranch is a historic ranch located in Vacaville, California, United States.

It features late Victorian and Queen Anne architecture. It was used for domestic subsistence agriculture. There are 12 historic buildings on the land including agricultural outbuildings, a single dwelling, processing, animal facility, storage, and secondary structures. It is situated on 4.5 acres and there is a 13th contributing building.

The main house dates from 1891, and was designed by architect Allen A. Cook from Sacramento. The ranch includes a gazebo from c.1892, a smoke house from 1877, a stock barn from c.1900, a buggy barn from 1902, and more.
