= E Clampus Vitus =

American fraternal organization

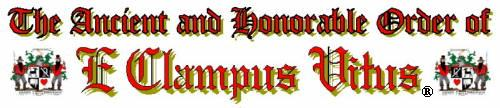

The Ancient and Honorable Order of E Clampus Vitus (ECV) is a fraternal organization dedicated to the preservation of the heritage of the Western United States, especially the history of the Mother Lode and gold mining regions of the area. There are chapters in California, Nevada, Arizona, New Mexico, Colorado, Utah, Washington, Idaho, Oregon, Montana and Wyoming. Members call themselves "Clampers." The organization's name is in Dog Latin, and has no known meaning; even the spelling is disputed, sometimes appearing as "Clampus," "Clampsus," or "Clampsis." The motto of the Order, Credo quia absurdum, generally interpreted as meaning "I believe it because it is absurd;" is a Latin phrase popularly misattributed to Tertullian.

== History ==
=== First incarnation ===
Members claim that the organization was brought from the Qing Dynasty in China to the United States in 1845 in Lewisport, Virginia, now West Union, West Virginia, when inn and stable owner Ephraim Bee was given a commission from the Emperor of China to "extend the work and influence of the Ancient and Honorable Order of E Clampus Vitus."

Bee claimed to have received his commission from Caleb Cushing, the American Commissioner to China. A monument to Bee in West Union now stands on the site of the old "Beehive" Inn along the North Bend Rail-Trail; the original "Bee Hive" was destroyed in a flood in the late 19th century.

At the age of 60, Bee was a Captain of the Doddridge County Militia, which protected the area from roving Confederate forces, horse thieves and outlaws. The Militia also had a part in the Underground Railroad in Doddridge County, hiding escaping slaves in hidden cellars of homes and also in Jaco Cave. Ephraim Bee II played his greatest joke on his local West Virginian neighbors. Occasionally, the entire town was invited to a great party. After the Civil War, it was discovered that Jaco Cave was a holding area for the runaway slaves. When the cave was full, Bee gave a party to keep all busy while that group of people was moved further north to the next stop.

The original purpose of the order appears to have been to initiate new members. When a stranger came to town, Clampers would inform him that to do business in the town it was essential to join the local secret society. The initiation rite was a parody of Freemasonic, Oddfellow and other orders, and took many forms, including rowing the initiate down a slanted ladder in a wheelbarrow, hoisting him into the air and leaving him there, or dropping him into a vat of water. Afterwards, the initiate had to buy the other members a round of drinks.

Bee felt that an organization was needed that was less exclusive than the other organizations of the day, such as the Masons, Elks and Odd Fellows. In addition, nativism was rising in the United States, as evidenced by such political organizations as the Know-Nothing Party. Bee opened membership in ECV to any "upstanding" man who had come of age. There were E Clampus Vitus chapters in Bedford, Pennsylvania; Metropolis, Illinois; Bowling Green, Missouri; and Dahlonega, Georgia. (It has been rumored that ECV brethren within the U.S. Army even attempted to bring the order as far south as Mexico City following the Mexican–American War, as a gesture of brotherhood and reconciliation, but all record has vanished of the well-intentioned Chapultepec chapter.)

The organization's leader was known as the Noble Grand Humbug, a title carried over into the later incarnation, and other "officials" included the Clampatriarch. Ephraim Bee, an early leader of the group, was styled Grand Gyascutis and later the Grand Lama. A move to greater seriousness was shown during the Civil War, when the Order changed its parade day from the first Sunday after the snows to the Fourth of July.

The history of E Clampus Vitus is steeped in mythology.

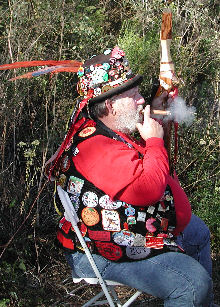
CEO of ECV Chapter .75 and founder of the Elephant Temperance Society exhibits a prime example of ECV regalia.

The early history of the organization is unclear. Historian Lois Rather suggests that the order originally came from the Southern states before being carried to California during the Gold Rush. The Sons of Malta, a fraternal society given to pranks and parody initiation rites, has been cited as an influence, even though the Sons of Malta do not seem to have existed until 1854 (though ECV may have inspired the Sons of Malta, as there were many disappointed by the California gold rush who returned East). Others maintain that the group is a native Californian institution, founded by one Joel Henry Zumwalt in Mokelumne Hill. Both legend and scholars agree that the group was founded in West Union, Virginia (now West Virginia) in 1845.

Chairman Moe of the Salt of the Scum of the Earth models an upright yet casual ECV look of red and black.

The organization is said to have been brought to California by a pioneer named Joel Henry Zumwalt, who encountered it in Missouri. Zumwalt organized an ECV lodge in Mokelumne Hill in 1851, when Mokelumne Hill Lodge No. 1001 was established. There are arguments that previous lodges had been founded in Hangtown, Downieville and Sierra City, but not all of those became permanent. Downieville ECV 1849 is still active.

ECV flourished, in part, as the result of the miners' reaction to the "established" organizations such as the Masons and Odd Fellows. Those groups had come to the mining country prior to ECV, and when ECV appeared, the older, more established groups looked down upon the more rowdy nature of E Clampsus Vitus. ECV, on the other hand, made fun of the stuffed shirts of the Masons: they made great fun of the sashes and ceremonial attire of the "upscale" fraternities, and began dressing in red shirts and pinning on badges made of cut-out tin can lids. This practice, called "wearing the tin", continues to this day, although the badges are frequently professionally made. Members commonly dress in a red shirt, black hat and Levi's jeans. ECV titles reflected the tongue-in-cheek nature of the organization. Officials were called "Noble Grand Humbug," "Roisterous Iscutis," "Grand Imperturbable Hangman," "Clamps Vitrix," and "Royal Gyascutis." All members are officers and all officers, the organization professes, are of equal indignity.

"Clamper" meetings were held in the Hall of Comparative Ovations, generally the back room of a saloon. Some chapters built or rented their own Hall of Comparative Ovations. One still stands in Murphys. Lodge meetings might be held twice a week, or weekly. Others met monthly, "before or after the full moon" or irregularly - "on the first Saturday before the next rain". Uninitiated men desiring to join were called "Poor Blind Candidates." They were required to present a poke of gold dust, although the value of the poke was left to the discretion of the brotherhood, and was frequently waived entirely if the prospective member could not afford it.

The Clamper flag was sometimes a hoop skirt, with the words "This is the flag we fight under." Despite the humor and rowdiness of E Clampus Vitus, the members did take their brotherhood seriously. When a member became sick or injured, the group would collect food or money to help him. They frequently trekked through the vastness of the Sierra Nevada to reach lonely miners who otherwise would have had no Christmas celebration. The society was also careful to assist the widows and orphans of fallen members.

Wayward Clampers showing their Red Shirts, tin and chapter affiliation. It is not uncommon for Clampers to share the good news of ECV while traveling which has led to growth throughout its history.

At the ECV's peak, around 1870, so many miners were members that mining camps might shut down during ECV celebrations (some mining towns had two chapters).

In late December 1895-January 1896, a British expatriate, Lord Sholto George Douglas (7 June 1872 - 6 April 1942), the fourth son of John Douglas, 9th Marquess of Queensberry, was managing a travelling troupe of actors on a tour of Northern California. The company's performances of "Confusion" (an 1883 "Splendid Comedy in Three Full Acts of Fun" by Joseph Derrick) began at Santa Rosa Athenaeum Christmas week, but performances had some very slim attendances; so the troupe “were [financially] up against it” when they came to Marysville. Ticket sales at the Marysville Theater were also weak, leaving manager Douglas short of funds and the Company's future in doubt. When the local LeBroke lodge of ECV became aware of his predicament, Lord Douglas was proffered and accepted an opportunity to join the Order. He was initiated into ECV in Turner Hall on January 21, 1896. Per pg. 3 of the San Francisco Call of January 23, 1896: "The lodge proposed that he stay over with his company until to-night (Weds. Jan 22nd 1896) and promised a big house. He (Sholto) agreed, and tonight the opera-house was packed." Cl

With the support of his new Brothers, the tour of the "Lord Sholto Douglas Company" resumed. A 20th century chapter of the ECV was named for Lord Sholto Douglas in honor of this event.

Mark Twain was a member, and it was while attending an ECV meeting that he heard the story which he wrote as The Celebrated Jumping Frog of Calaveras County.

=== Reestablishment ===
Early afternoon ECV colloquium focused on the lasting effects of Byzantine and Medieval history on the Santa Margarita Ranch and environs

The original E Clampus Vitus faded in some regions after the Civil War, while in other areas it thrived until 1918. A "second era" version of the organization was formed in 1930 by San Franciscan attorney and cartographic historian Carl Irving Wheat. The new incarnation of ECV was somewhat more serious than its predecessor, as a historical society as well as a mirth making club. ECV historical plaques are found on many buildings around California.

The drinking and revelry aspects were not entirely abandoned however, with one man accidentally shot dead during a drunken party in Columbia in 1967.

As the mining industry faded towards the end of the 19th century, ECV started to fade as well. It was revitalized in 1931 by Wheat and his friends G. Ezra Dane and Leon O. Whitsell. They were contacted by Adam Lee Moore, one of the surviving leaders of the original ECV, who passed on all that he could remember of the organization's rites and legends. The three founded a new chapter, Yerba Buena Number 1, or the "Capitulus Redivivus." Wheat described E Clampus Vitus as "the comic strip on the page of California history."

New chapters sprang up in Los Angeles (Platrix Chapter #2) and other major cities in California, and were numbered sequentially. However, once Lodge 10 was established in 1936, members pointed out that it was illogical for such a rowdy organization to be so neat in its numbering scheme, and so some creativity was developed in the numbering. The "Pair-o-Dice" chapter in Paradise, for example, is Lodge No. 7-11. The de la Guerra y Pacheco chapter, halfway between Lodge Number 1 in San Francisco and Lodge Number 2 in Los Angeles, is Lodge Number 1.5. There were chapters in British Columbia and Hawaii, but they no longer exist.

In 1936, a plaque appeared in Northern California purporting to have been made by Sir Francis Drake during his voyage of discovery in which it was stated that he had claimed all of California for England, and that he had the authority of the claim by having been ceded the land by the local Miwok Indians. The man who was chief of the Miwoks in 1937, William Fuller, was a member of E Clampus Vitus. During an ECV meeting, he revoked the cession of land to England, and ceded it all to the United States government. The so-called Drake's Plate of Brass was accepted as authentic for forty years, yet was in actuality a hoax initiated by Dane that got out of control. It is now thought that the Fuller ceremony was part of an effort for the perpetrators to tip off the plate's finders as to its true origins.

== The current ECV ==
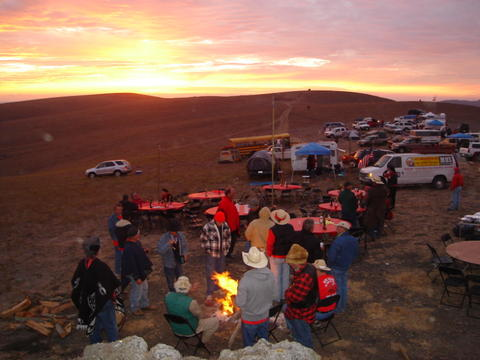
A clampout at sunset. Clampsite location is China Harbor on the Pacific Coast near Cayucos, California.

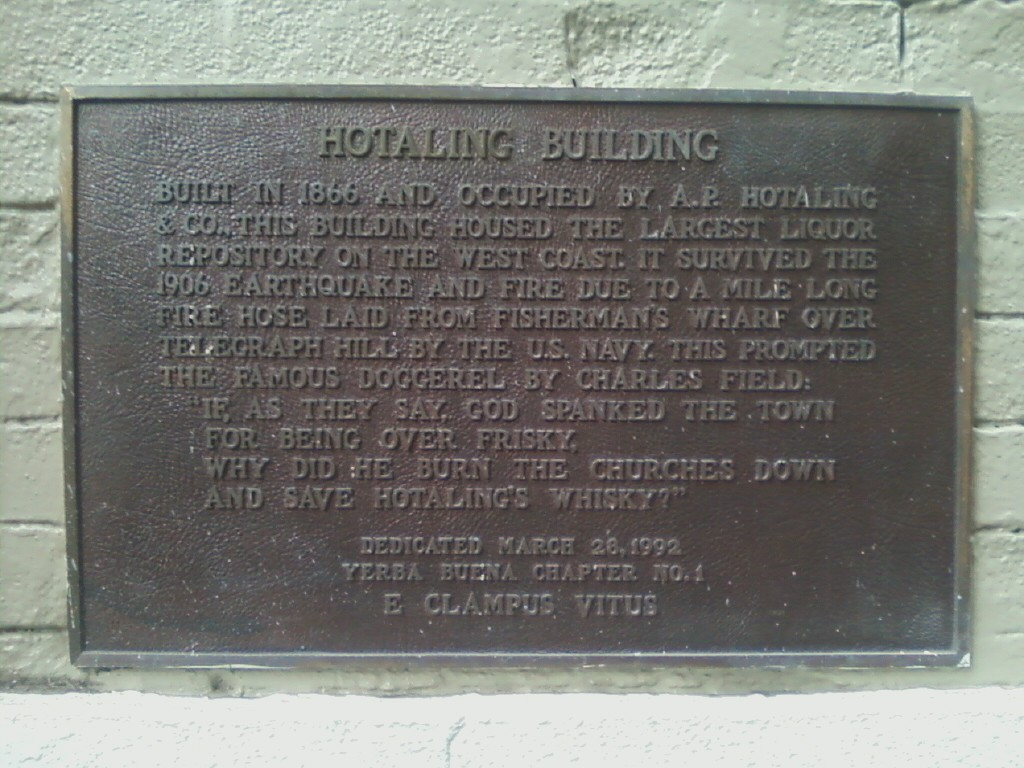
A plaque placed by E Clampus Vitus in San Francisco, California.

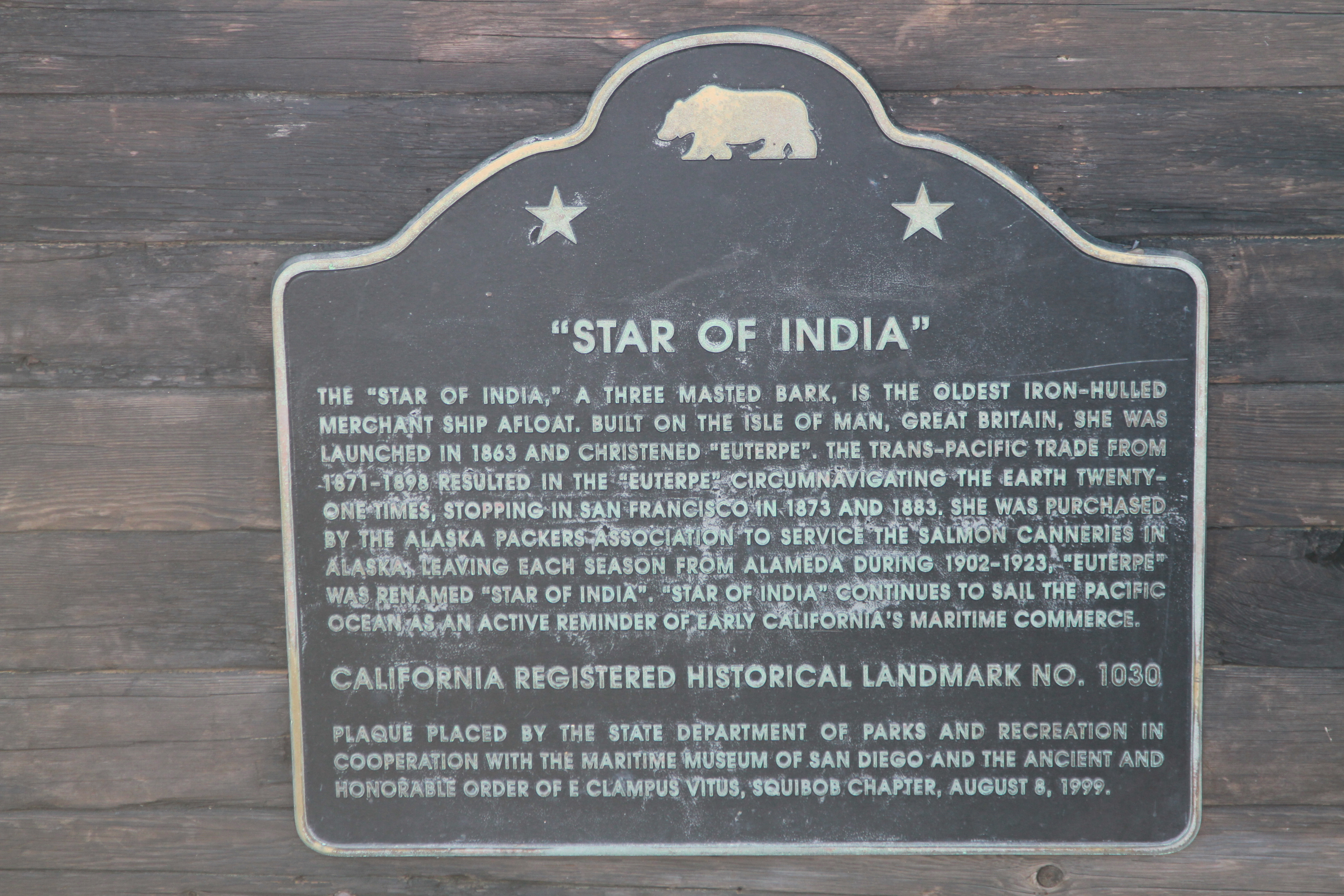
Plaque commemorating the Star of India as a California landmark

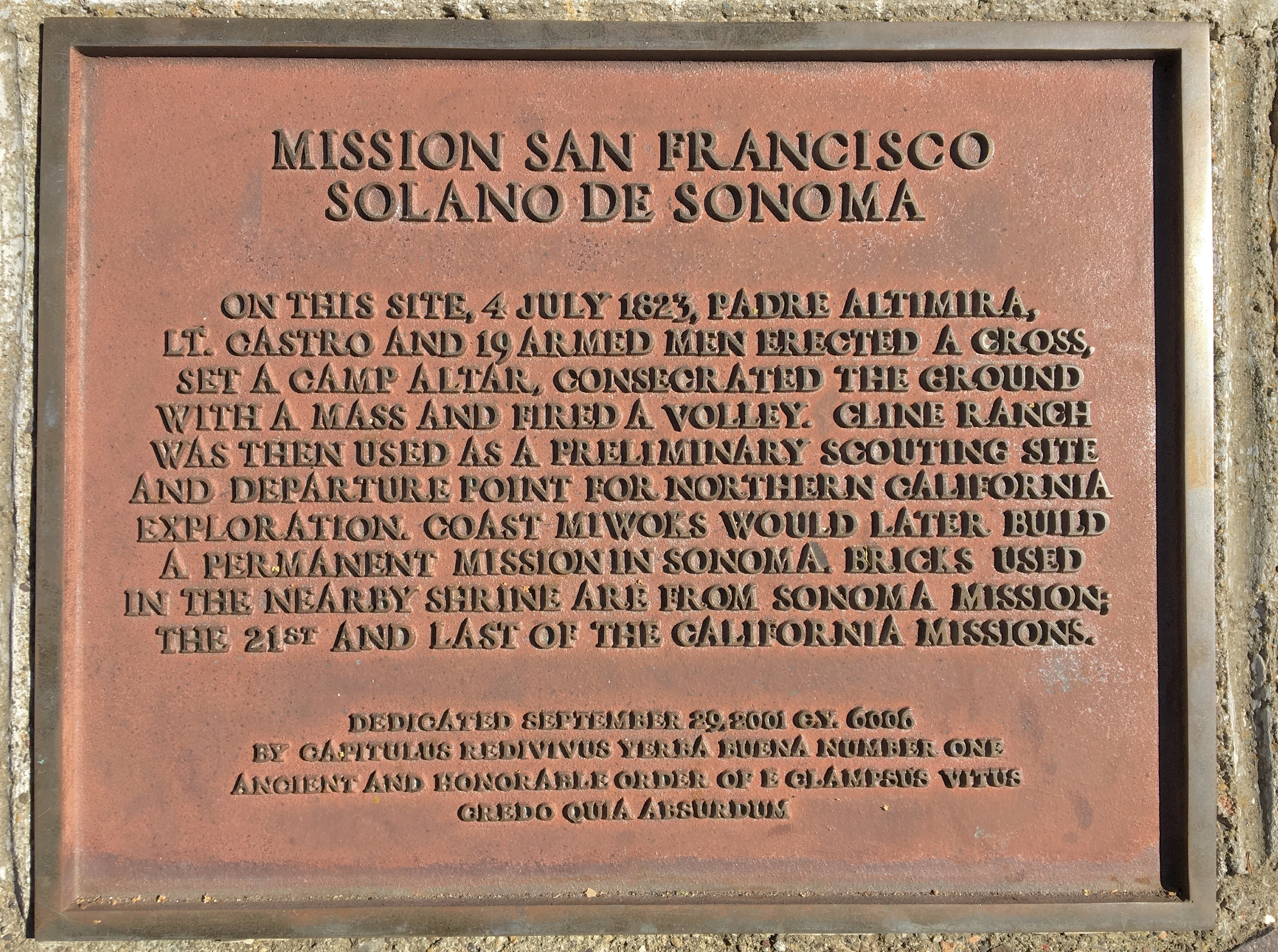
Plaque marking the original location of the 21st Catholic mission in Sonoma, California

In 1991 there were 50,000 Clampers in 62 lodges.

== Notable members ==
Notable clamper members include:

- Ephraim Bee (1802–1888)
- George Derby (1823–1861)
- Pete Goicoechea (b. 1949)
- Hans Halberstadt (b. 1944)
- Harry Love (lawman) (1810–1868)
- Don Meadows (1897–1994)
- Alexander Howison Murray Jr. (1907–1993)
- Lloyd Raffetto (1897–1988)
- Archie Stevenot (1882–1968)
- Carl Irving Wheat (1892–1966)
- Charles Lewis Camp (palaeontologist, zoologist and historian) (1893–1975)

ECV claims many men of note to have been members, whether they were members or not: Philip D. Armour, the meat packer; John Mohler Studebaker, the automobile manufacturer; Gene Autry "The Singing Cowboy" who owned the California Angels baseball team; and John Hume, a California state assemblyman. ECV also claims Ulysses S. Grant, Lord Sholto Douglas, (Note: Clan Douglas has had many members named Sholto, beginning with the mythical founder of the clan; it is not clear which one is referred to here. Of the five with articles, only one, Sholto Douglas, 19th Earl of Morton (1844–1935), could have been a member in that time period, and there is no suggestion in the article of any involvement with California. Another Sholto of the clan was arrested in California for insanity in 1895, but it is not even clear if his surname was Douglas.) J. Pierpont Morgan, Horace Greeley, and Horatio Alger as members, but claims have also been made to Adam (the first "Clampatriarch"), Solomon, Julius Caesar and Augustus Caesar, Henry VIII of England, Sir Francis Drake, George Washington, Andrew Jackson, Ronald Reagan, and His Imperial Majesty Joshua A. Norton, "Emperor of these United States and Protector of Mexico". These fanciful claims show ECV's propensity for not taking much of anything particularly seriously, least of all itself.

Certain circumstances support an ECV claim to having initiated Ulysses S. Grant into the Order. One of the early capitals of California was Benicia. At the close of the War with Mexico, Lt. William Tecumseh Sherman was Adjutant to Col. Richard Barnes Mason at the time of the gold discovery at Sutter's Mill. Upon Sherman's retirement in 1853, his replacement at the Benicia Arsenal was Lt. Ulysses S. Grant, who spent 30 days in the Arsenal Guardhouse for being drunk on duty and firing his cannons at the Martinez shoreline. Considering Benicia's position as the major inland Army post and transport hub to the valley, both Grant's and the Brotherhood's affinity for strong drink and the early spread of the Brotherhood through Northern California, it is entirely possible that Grant was inducted into the Organization.

== See also ==
- Drake's Plate of Brass
