= Dahnohabe, California =

Former Pomo settlement in California, U.S.

Dahnohabe (also, Dah-no-habe and Do-no-ha-be) is a former Pomo settlement in Lake County, California, United States. It was located on the west side of Clear Lake; its precise location is unknown.

The Dahnohabe Pomo were among several groups of Pomo from the Clear Lake area who met with George Gibbs in 1852. According to Gibbs, the name means "stone mountain".
