= Ubakhea, California =

Former Pomo settlement in California, U.S.

Ubakhea is a former Pomo settlement in Mendocino County, California, United States and a division of the Pomo people named for the settlement, recorded by George Gibbs in 1851. It was located in southern Mendocino County, near Sanel; its precise location is unknown.

The Ubakhea band of Pomo are one of four bands of Pomo described by Gibbs as living between Sanel and the coast; the other three are Bochheaf, Tabahtea, and Moiya.
