= Bokea, California =

Former Pomo settlement in California, U.S.

Bokea (also, Boch-heaf) is a former Pomo settlement in Mendocino County, California, United States, one of a number of Pomo settlements catalogued by Stephen Powers. It was located in Rancheria Valley; its precise location is unknown.

The Boch-heaf band of Pomo are one of four bands of Pomo described by George Gibbs as living between Hopland and the coast; the other three are Moiya, Tabahtea, and Ubakhea.
