= Moiya, California =

Former Pomo settlement in California, U.S.

Moiya is a former Pomo settlement in Mendocino County, California, United States. It was located near Hopland; its precise location is unknown.

The Moiya band of Pomo are one of four bands of Pomo described by George Gibbs as living between Hopland and the coast; the other three are Bochheaf, Tabahtea, and Ubakhea.
