= Sholto =

Sholto may refer to:

== People with the name ==
- Sholto Kairakau Black (1902–1963), New Zealand teacher, principal, community services co-ordinator, community leader
- Sholto Kynoch, English pianist
- Basil William Sholto Mackenzie, 2nd Baron Amulree (1900–1983), British physician and leading advocate of geriatric medicine in the UK
- Sholto Marcon (1890–1959), Church of England schoolmaster, clergyman and international field hockey player
- Sholto Percy, pseudonym of Joseph Clinton Robertson (1787–1852), Scottish patent agent, writer and periodical editor
- Sholto Taylor (born 1972), wheelchair rugby player, and a member of the national team, the Wheel Blacks

== Fictional entities ==
- Bartholomew and Thaddeus Sholto, characters in Arthur Conan Doyle's Sherlock Holmes novel, The Sign of the Four (1890)
- Sholto, character in Emily Rodda's The Three Doors

== See also ==
- Sholto Douglas (disambiguation)
- Sharlto Copley
