= Orange County Historical Society =

Orange County Historical Society may refer to:

Orange County Historical Society, Orange County, Connecticut

- Orange County Historical Society (Orange County, California) - Orange County, California
- Orange County Historical Society - Orange County, Florida
- Orange County Historical Society (Orange County, Indiana) - Orange County, Indiana

Orange County Historical Society, Orange County, New York

- Orange County Historical Society (Orange County, Virginia) - Orange County, Virginia
