= Sons of Malta =

Mid 19th-century confraternity

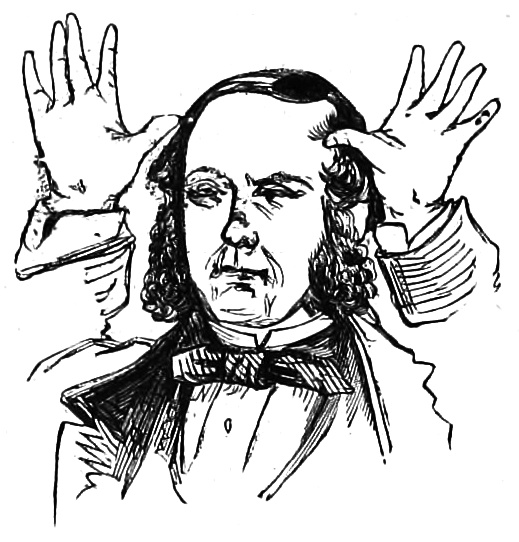
The sign of salute to the grand master after the candidate has passed the outer door

The Independent Order of the Sons of Malta was a fraternal order active in the mid-nineteenth century. Its initiation rites parodied more staid fraternal orders such as the Freemasons.

== Origin ==
The origins of the Sons of Malta are obscure and contentious.

B. J. Griswold's 1917 The Pictorial History of Fort Wayne, Indiana, states, "A secret society, known as the 'Sons of Malta,' with local lodges in many of the larger American cities, was organized in 1856 by A. G. Barnett and Morton Taylor....The Fort Wayne lodge enrolled many of the prominent men of the day. It was instituted by General Stedman [sic] of Toledo, Ohio."

- Griswold may have meant to convey that Steedman instituted the Fort Wayne lodge and that Barnett and Taylor did the actual organizational work necessary to launch that particular lodge (or may have meant to convey something else entirely), but the apparent implication that Barnett and Taylor originated the Sons of Malta as an organization was repeated explicitly in the endnotes to More of a Man: Diaries of a Scottish Craftsman in Mid-Nineteenth-Century North America, though they curiously did not cite The Pictorial History of Fort Wayne, or any other source that (implicitly or explicitly) did so.
- In the Fort Wayne Sentinel of February 15, 1890, Dr. W. H. Brooks confirms that "the Sons of Malta had been in existence for a number of years and its branches had been pretty widely scattered among the larger cities in America before a lodge was established in Fort Wayne," as well as that A. G. Barnett was a member of the Fort Wayne lodge.

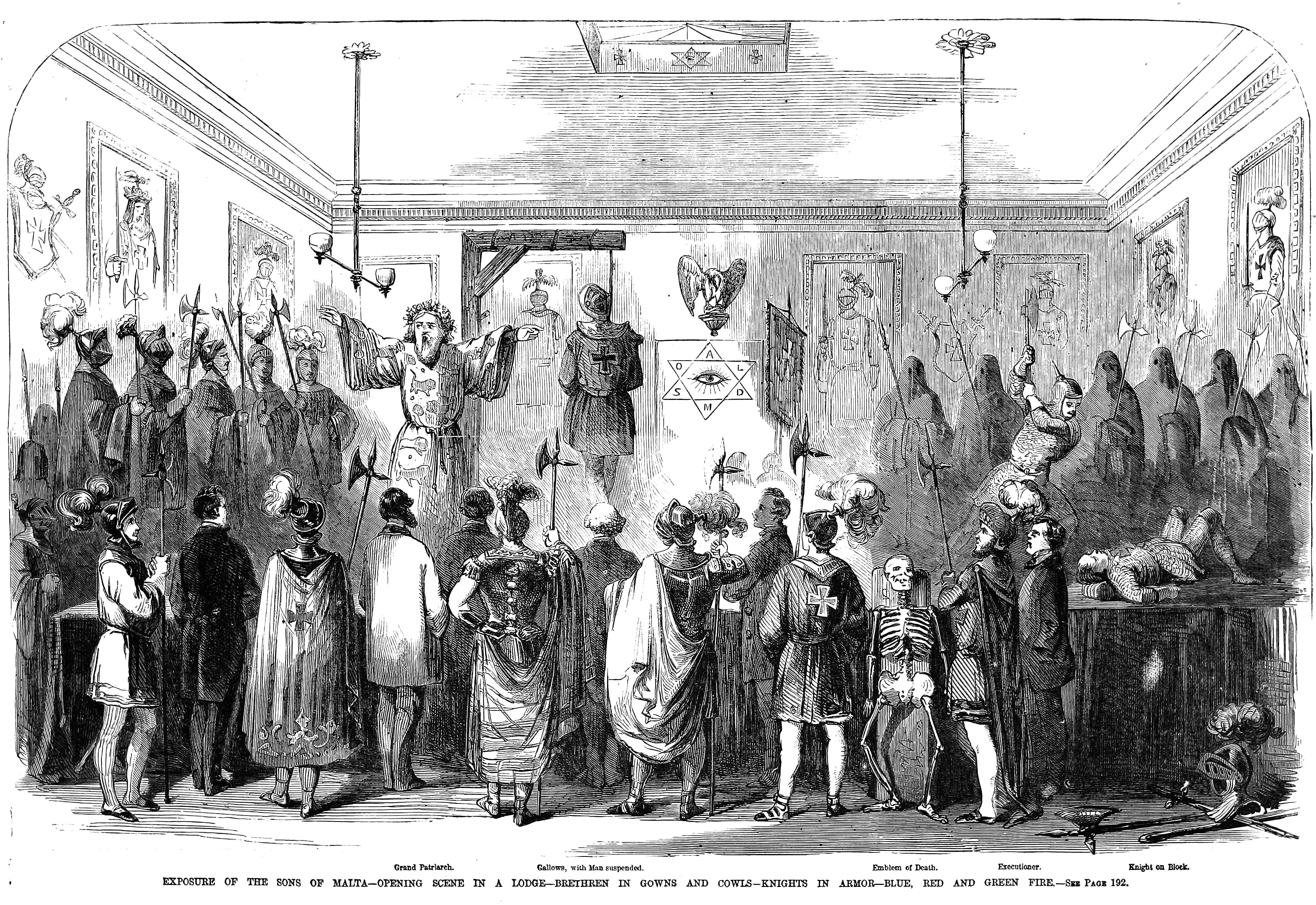
Exposure of the Sons of Malta—Opening Scene in a Lodge—1860

The entry for the Sons of Malta in the 1899 Encyclopedia of the History of St. Louis states that they were "A mystic society, which came into existence in St. Louis in 1855, and which about the same time seems to have been represented in nearly all the larger, and many of the smaller, cities of the country. It is said to have originated in Mobile, Alabama, once the queen of mystic society cities, and to have been, in a sense, an outgrowth of Mardi Gras festivities."

- The "mystic societies" of Mobile originally paraded on New Year's Eve and continued to do so until 1861, so any connection of the Sons of Malta to Mobile had nothing to do with Mardi Gras festivities (the first Mardi Gras parading secret society, the Mistick Krewe of Comus, was founded in New Orleans in 1856 and first paraded in 1857).

An account more contemporary with the origins of the Sons of Malta, though still more than thirty years after the fact, was provided by "old-time newspaper man" Phocion Howard in 1886: "When the yellow fever for the first time became sporadic in New Orleans, when white, creole, and black by the hundreds were dying every day, A. L. Saunders continued publication of the Delta, and filled it with wit and humor so as to divert the minds from the sad visitation. And when that failed he sent his own pilot-boat over to Mobile and brought John Forsyth, editor of the Mobile Register, to New Orleans, and the two originated the I. O. S. M.—Independent Order of the Sons of Malta. Even at that early date all the South was inoculated with the idea of filibustering...Mr. Saunders has often told me that in a house on Canal street where he and Forsyth wrote the ritual for the Sons of Malta, there were then five yellow-fever corpses. Having perfected the ritual, which was as prettily written as anything could be, having for its object "the wresting from the dominion of Spain the Gem of the Antilles and setting it in the diadem of Southern chivalry," a call was published for volunteers to go to Cuba. Under this excitement of war the lower classes forgot their griefs and became joyous and happy...That was the beginning of the ill-fated Lopez expeditions..."

In assessing Howard's report of Saunders' claims, the following should be taken into account:

- Narciso López's first Cuban expedition took place in September 1849; his final invasion was in August 1851, resulting in his execution on September 1, 1851.
- The Daily Delta and its editor, Laurent J. Sigur, were indeed noted for their support of filibustering in general and López in particular (Note: "Let us now review the causes and results of this [, the final López,] expedition. At the time I received my appointment from Mr. Sigur, one of the editors of the New Orleans Delta, I was told by him that a revolt was regularly organized among the Creoles throughout the Island of Cuba; that they had elected Gen. Lopez as their leader, and their object was to free Cuba from the tyranny of Spain....our first salutation was a volley of musketry, instead of, as the Delta asserts, a large body of friends with horses, stores, &c., for our use.") (Sigur was Colonel of a battalion that was supposed to take part in López's final invasion of Cuba); but any suspicion of direct involvement by A. L. Saunders in organizing or rallying support for the López expeditions seems to have gone completely unrecorded.
- A. L. Saunders was, however, a prominent figure in the subsequent attempts, starting in 1853, by John A. Quitman to organize an invasion of Cuba; this attempt started to fizzle out in 1854 after the Federal government took steps to more strictly enforce the 1818 Neutrality Act, making participating or investing in filibusters potentially riskier and less rewarding. Among these steps was a grand jury investigation of rumored preparations for filibuster invasions of Cuba before which Saunders (as well as Quitman and López associate John Sidney Thrasher, publisher of the New Orleans newspaper The Beacon of Cuba) refused to testify. They were subsequently required to post bond of $3,000 each as a pledge against violating the Neutrality Act for nine months, which they did under protest (the protests being published in the Delta of July 4, 1854). Saunders subsequently went to Kentucky, where he claimed a thousand men could be raised for an invasion. There is no indication extant that Saunders' attempts to aid Quitman were anything but earnest.
- It's difficult to determine what year Mr. Howard might have meant by that in which "the yellow fever for the first time became sporadic in New Orleans." There were no recorded deaths from yellow fever in 1821, but from 1822 (237 recorded deaths from yellow fever) to the peak year of 1853 (7849 deaths), there were only five years in which recorded yellow fever deaths were in the single digits, with year to year recorded deaths swinging wildly: 452 recorded deaths in 1839, 3 recorded deaths in 1840, 594 recorded deaths in 1841, 211 recorded deaths in 1842, 487 recorded deaths in 1843, 83 recorded deaths in 1844, 2 recorded deaths in 1845, 146 recorded deaths in 1846, 2306 recorded deaths in 1847, 808 recorded deaths in 1848, 769 recorded deaths in 1849, 107 recorded deaths in 1850, 17 recorded deaths in 1851, 456 recorded deaths in 1852, and 7849 recorded deaths in 1853. 1841 and 1846 would seem the obvious pre-Lopez expedition years, coming as they did after a lull in yellow fever deaths, if the account of Mr. Howard's recollections is to be trusted. A possibility worth considering is that Mr. Howard was confusing A. L. Saunders' post-Lopez efforts to organize an invasion of Cuba with the Lopez expedition.
- An organization called the Order of the Lone Star was formed in New Orleans shortly after López's execution in 1851 at the offices of the Lafayette True Delta, with rituals written by Senator John Henderson.
- The Times-Picayune of New Orleans ran announcements of meetings of Division No. 2 of the Order of the Lone Star from November 5, 1851, to August 11, 1854. The Daily Globe of Washington, D.C., pronounced the Order of the Lone Star "dormant"on September 29 of 1854.
- On November 17, 1854, two months after the last notice for a meeting of the Order of the Lone Star appeared in the Times-Picayune, the same paper carried a notice: "I. O. S. M.-Brahmah [sic] Lodge No. 1 There will be a regular meeting of this lodge THIS EVENING, at the Mechanics Institute Room 4, at 7 1/2 o'clock."

Ultimately, the extent of A. L. Saunders' involvement, if any, in both the Order of the Lone Star and the Sons of Malta is unclear.

It was definitely believed, however, at least after the Sons of Malta's decline, that there was a connection between the two organizations:

- "...the order of the LONE STAR, under whose auspices men and means were raised for the Lopez raids upon the Island of Cuba, in the years 1850 and 1851, and for the subsequent forays into the Central American States under the leadership of the 'grey-eyed man of destiny,' William Walker. These hostile designs upon the territory of our Southern neighbors having failed, the order fell into disrepute, and its secrets were exposed and burlesqued by the Sons of Malta." Note that this indicated, as did Phocion Howard's later recollection of A. L. Saunders' claims, the Order of the Lone Star existing prior to López's filibuster attempts.
- K. Loric wrote in 1883: "Just a quarter of a century ago a secret society, known as the Sons of Malta, sprang suddenly into existence in the city of New Orleans. The original object of the organization was the capture of Cuba, and many prominent military men of the South were the leading spirits in the movement. For reasons which the writer is not at liberty to divulge, the filibustering plans of the order were abruptly squelched, and soon thereafter a well-known newspaper man, who had been initiated, conceived the idea of making 'some fun for the boys.' The whole business of initiation, etc., was transformed into a series of the most stupendous sells, practical jokes and outrageously comical proceedings ever dreamed of. The order spread rapidly all over the Union."

According to Dr. Rob Morris of Kentucky's recollections, published in 1885, that "well known newspaper man" was George D. Prentice, editor of the Louisville Journal. Morris did not ascribe any influence of the Order of the Lone Star's initiation rituals on those of the Sons of Malta: "The older Masons of Louisville will recall the incident of [Prentice's] initiation into Freemasonry, as I have often related them in my lectures. As a candidate he was by no means 'one of the still and smiling kind,' and in reply to 'the standard questions' propounded him on the occasion, alternately shocked the brethren and convulsed them with laughter. In this spirit he undertook to prepare that celebrated travesty of Freemasonry entitled 'The Sons of Malta' in which, with considerable originality, are sacrilegiously blended some of the most sacred tenets of the order. It became the mother of many other fraternities of the sort, until now every community has its caricature of the Ancient Craft. Long before his death Mr. Prentice saw his mistake in this organization, but the mischief was irreparable."

Dr. W. H. Brooks also indicated that Prentice was involved in the creation of the Sons of Malta: "The Sons of Malta is supposed to have been the invention of Mr. Prentice, the famous Louisville editor, and a few jolly kindred spirits. To the uninitiated public it was believed to be an order of men secretly banded together for the purpose of capturing the Island of Cuba, and the respect for the Monroe Doctrine, which the members always professed, had the effect of confirming that belief.

== Proliferation of lodges ==
As mentioned, the November 17, 1854 Times-Picayune contained a notice for a meeting of the I.O. S. M. The December 27 edition of that paper, in reporting on the burning of the Mechanics' Building, says "The Sons of Malta lost all their effects, as did the United Laborers' Association." The January 6, 1855 edition carries the notice, "I.O. Sons of Malta.—A meeting of the Brahmin Lodge No. 1 takes place at 7 o'clock this evening" as well as a classified ad elaborating that the meeting "will take place at the Odd Fellows Hall, Room No. 3."

Thereafter, the Times-Picayune regularly carried notices for meetings of the Brahmin lodge of the Sons of Malta meetings; on August 2, 1855, they also printed "A Letter From Ocean Springs," which mentions that "the Sons of Malta are doing a flowing business" at that Mississippi coastal resort.

In October the Times-Picayune carried notices for meetings of "Pelican Lodge, No. 4," "Desambrier Lodge No. 2," "Mercantile Lodge No. 5," and the by then usual Friday notice of the meeting of the Brahmin Lodge.

Since the Sons of Malta were a secret, or at least secretive, organization, it can not be assumed that lodges made themselves immediately (or in some cases, ever) known to the public. Reports and intimations of Lodges during the early spread of the order include:

- Hopkins Lodge No. 6, of the Independent Order of Sons of Malta, was incorporated in the state of Missouri on December 13, 1855.
- The announcement of "a new weekly paper, to be published at the City of Galveston, under the auspices of the 'Order of Malta.' This pride of the projectors, will display upon its visiting cards, the Ignis Fatuus or the Jack O'the Lantern" in the Texas Sun, (Richmond, Tex.) of March 22, 1856. (Note: The full text reads, "By private letter from one of the initiated, a son of light, we have received the Prospectus of a new weekly paper, to be published at the City of Galveston, under the auspices of the 'Order of Malta.' This pride of the projectors, will display upon its visiting cards, the Ignis Fatuus or the Jack O'the Lantern. Enlisted in it support, is engaged some of the rarest talent and some of the most amusing and incorrigible wags, that ever awakened the spirit of mirth. Confined in their aims by 'no pent up Utica,' 'the trio,' with a disinterested philanthropy which editors alone feel and appreciate, will not only take under their kind supervision, the affairs of this mundane world, but will occasionally, draw aside the curtain which separates the material from the spirit rapping realms and with their magic wands, disclose mysteries, deep, astounding, and inconceivable in panoramic grandeur. It is not for us however, graphic, may be our descriptive powers, to delineate in advance, the refreshing prospect, destined at an unprepared moment, to fill the mind and delight the imagination, with conceptions hitherto, even withheld from the inspiration of creative Fancy. It is only ours to hail the appearance of the new illumination, and cry, 'more light,' whether it comes from an Ignis Fatuus or the solar Sun.) At least one issue of the Ignis Fatuus was subsequently published. (Note: "The Ignis Fatuus is a spicy little paper published in Galveston. It is conducted by a committee of gentlemen appointed by the ancient and honorable Sons of Malta. Whether the public will become enlightened in the mysteries of this organization remains to be seen. The present number does not even give the price of oats.")
- According to the History of Chicago, From the Earliest Period to the Present Time, a Chicago lodge was established on September 1, 1856.
- The Wilmington Journal (Wilmington, North Carolina) of Friday, July 10, 1857, mentions part of an unnamed, presumably local, chapter's initiation being witnessed by "an ex-policeman, now a constable" in the summer of 1856.
- From an item in the Syracuse, New York, Daily Courier of June 19, 1857: "We clip the following mysterious item from the [Albany] Atlas and Argus. What can it mean?" The clipped item relates that the Sons of Malta, "a secret society formed in New York last winter" was gaining in popularity and had a lodge in Albany.
- From the Weekly Wisconsin (Milwaukee, Wisconsin) of May 13, 1857: "SONS OF MALTA: There is, as is well-known, an ancient and honorable brotherhood of this name, having, perhaps, more numerous branches in the Southern states than in the North. There is a lodge in this city, recently established..."
- The June 10, 1857, edition of the Times-Picayune from New Orleans, included the following: "The New York correspondent of the Boston Evening Gazette has the following item in one of his amusing letters: A new order has lately been established in the city, entitled 'The Sons of Malta,' of which every body that is any body is becoming a member." The article lists E. L. Davenport and John Brougham as officers of the New York lodge. The entry for the Sons of Malta in The Cyclopædia of Fraternities (1907) states that the order was "organized in the South before the Civil War" and "soon became conspicuous at New Orleans, whence it was taken to Boston by E. L. Davenport and John Brougham," apparently misunderstanding the Boston Evening Gazette article.
- The New Orleans Times-Picayune reported on August 6, 1857, that "The Boston Bee says a movement has been commenced in that city towards establishing the Sons of Malta."
- Mention of the Sons of Malta in Alabama appear in the October 20, 1857 edition of the Times-Picayune (reprinted the next day), and mention of the Sons of Malta in Philadelphia appear in the November 12, 1857 edition (including a reference to the S.O.M.'s motto, "'Tis well!", implying that the writer was a Sons of Malta's initiate).
- The Emporia Weekly News (Emporia, Kansas) of December 12, 1857 gives a fanciful history of the order's supposed origins in Malta, including Napoleon and Nelson as initiates, (Note: In the year 1522, when Charles V. granted the Island of Malta to the Order of St. John, of Jerusalem, the son of the grand master resolved on secretly constructing a subterranean encampment, organizing a new order of worshipful knights, composed of the sons of Malta....In 1798, the grand master, Hompeck[sic], surrendered the Island to Napoleon, who subsequently became a member of the order. And to this fact may be attributed his success in arms. The island was afterwards captured by Nelson, who also was inducted into the secrets of the order, and became grand knight of the bath, and admiral of the sea.) and concluding "the order flourishes. Not confined now are its sons to the nobility; Princes, Emperors, Czars, and Sultans acknowledge the supremacy of the grand commander-in-chief, and he is a citizen." This piece was reprinted in the White Cloud Kansas Chief (White Cloud, Kansas) of January 21, 1858, and the Nebraska Advertiser (Brownville, Nebraska) of February 11, 1858.
- The Baltimore Sun of January 4, 1858, mentions a New Haven, Connecticut chapter; on January 7 the Sun announced that "The Sons of Malta, in Boston, have formed a Grand Lodge for Massachusetts, to have jurisdiction over the New England States until such time as grand lodges in those states shall be established severally."
- A lodge of the Sons of Malta was organized in Ottawa in 1858.
- A lodge was founded in Fort Scott, Kansas, in late fall of 1859. (Note: Mr. Goodlander wrote that the S.O.M. were "organized in the early '50s after the failure of General Lopez's invasion of Cuba and was claimed and was supposed to take revenge on his enemies who prevented his successful invasion of Cuba." He later mentions that candidates for initiation were subjected to questions that included, "if he was going to attack Cuba would he lie and wait and steal in upon it, or would make a bold dash. The victim generally said he would lie and wait and steal in upon it. This remark would be taken up by the recorder, who, speaking through a large trumpet, would say 'He lies and steals, let it be recorded,'——all members saying the same in solemn voice.")
- A Wyoming delegation attended the National Encampment of the Sons of Malta in early 1860.

== First Grand Assembly ==
On June 11, 1858, The Baltimore Sun printed a report from their Philadelphia correspondent that "Arrangements have been made to hold a convention of delegates from the different lodges of the Sons of Malta throughout the United States in this city, during the next month. Delegates are expected from all parts of the Union, and from Cuba, Chihuahua, and Sonora. It is probable that over one hundred lodges will be represented in the convention. One of the objects of holding the convention is to consolidate the order, and institute a Grand Lodge for the United States, with jurisdiction over the lodges in Cuba and Mexico." The existence of lodges in Cuba, Mexico, or (as later press claimed) Europe may have been factual or may have been more of the fanciful humbuggery that was part of the Sons of Malta's standard practice.

The same correspondent for the Sun on July 19: "About three hundred delegates have arrived to attend the national convention of the Sons of Malta, which assembles in this city Monday morning next. The Mine-Ha-Ha lodge have made the most ample provisions for the entertainment of the strangers...Among the curiosities in the hall is a punch bowl presented to the Order by Cambridge Lodge, No. 1957, of London, large enough for a man to swim in.-The convention will be in session three days. The California delegates are already here. The French and English delegates are on board of the Canada, and will reach here on Monday noon. Cincinnati will send nearly one hundred delegates." (Note: There is no recorded evidence of European lodges. The only documentation extant of any Sons of Malta lodge in California is for "I. 0. of S. M., PIONEER LODGE, No. 1., which was organized March 15th, 1860, according to the San Francisco Directory for the Year Commencing July 1860, but there may have been a great number of self-styled, independent lodges. The California "delegation" may not have been delegates proper, as it was reported that there were 1500 visiting members in addition to the delegates.)

It was also reported that officers for "the Supreme Grand Council of the Sons of Malta of the United States, Cuba and Mexico" were chosen from Massachusetts, Illinois, Pennsylvania, Ohio and New York. The Sun's Philadelphia correspondent stated that there were 700 delegates, including a New Jersey delegation, a large number of Baltimore Sons of Malta, and "two English Lords," "Lord Derbon" and "Lord Ernest."

The Times-Picayune (New Orleans, Louisiana) of July 27, 1858 quoting the Philadelphia North American, "speaking of the assembling of the national convention": "In England the office of Grand Commander is held by His Royal Highness the Duke of Cambridge, and Prince Albert condescends to perform the less arduous and important duties of G.R.J.A. In the United States, Mr. Breckenridge, the Vice President, is Grand Commander, and Hon. S.A. Douglas is G.R.J.A. Indeed, throughout Europe the order is hailed as one of the democratic features of the age, while prince and peasant and parvenu, within its sacred precincts, meet upon a common recognition of the universal brotherhood."

The Burlington Weekly Free Press apparently took the reported membership of the Duke of Cambridge, Prince Albert, Vice President Breckenridge, and Stephen Douglas at face value, adding that "No prominent or well known citizens appear to have attended the convention, or to be among the officers of the national organization then established."

== Public reaction ==
In The New York Times of July 16, 1858, their Boston correspondent reports, "Fears are entertained that the Sons of Malta are a political club...Perhaps they are, but I know nothing of them or of their doings."

Part of the Sons of Malta's ongoing humbuggery seems to have been the perpetuation of the notion that they were actively engaged in plotting filibuster expeditions, as demonstrated by the following news items:

- "THE SECRET EXPEDITION.-We learn from the Detroit Advertiser, that the Lodges of Michigan, Illinois, Ohio and Wisconsin of the Sons of Malta are about purchasing two of the Lake clippers for an expedition to some part of the world. Many suppose that Cuba is the point arrived at, and that the Maltese Cross will soon wave in triumph over the 'Queen of the Antilles'."
- "It is stated in this morning's Tribune that the Sons of Malta, of Jersey City, have concluded a purchase of the English ship Great Eastern, which is to be fitted up as soon as possible, to make regular trips between the island of St. Helena and Parts Unknown."
- "SONS OF MALTA-RUMORS OF FILIBUSTERING-This order which has attained a widespread notority [sic], has assumed a phase which has never been made public heretofore. This is given by the New York Herald, which states that in consequence of the alarming increase of Cuban filibusterism in the north, the Spanish authorities at Cuba have stationed spies in New York to watch the signs of the times. These have reported to the home government that they have discovered in the Sons of Malta nothing more or less than a well conducted organization for the conquest of Cuba. The Herald does not pretend to discredit the report.
- The Daily Alta California of May 16, 1859, carried a report from Washington D.C. that "Our city has lotely [sic] been visited by a number of Spanish spies. These are continually finding new proofs of the existence of a large filibuster organization here, to operate against Cuba, and all kinds of reports are circulated by them. Among the latest reports made by them to the Captain General of Havana, is one stating that the Order of the Sons of Malta is the cover of the movement they pretend to have discovered."
- "The Sons of Malta are about to receive a tremendous accession in the person of little Billy Walker. He has applied for membership and been elected, but is not yet initiated to the fearful mysteries of that eccentric order. Billy's motive is supposed to be the conversion of the jovial Sons into filibusters..."

The Sons of Malta were noted for their charitable work, of which there are numerous newspaper accounts. Especially noted was assistance provided by the Ingomar Lodge No. 1 of Memphis,, Tennessee, for the care of the survivors of the wreck of the steamboat St. Nicholas in April 1859.

"The order [of the Sons of Malta] was understood to claim an origin with the persecuted saints of the Isle of Malta in the fifteenth century, but this was doubtless nearer fiction than reality. Its precise character and object were never definitely disclosed. The public gained an impression that it was largely for the cultivation of whatever was comic, droll or ridiculous in thought, speech and action. It had sufficient membership to give a long spectral procession one night, the marchers draped in sheets, which nearly the whole town came curiously out to see." Many lodges of the Sons of Malta organized spectacular, solemn marches, often at midnight and usually followed by all night repasts by the members. Most accounts of the marches noted public enjoyment of the spectacle, but in commenting on reports of one such march in New York City, The Emporia Weekly News wrote "What the Sons of Malta are, or what all this fantastic mummery signifies, we do not know. It seems very much like a regretful look backward from civilized life towards the freedom and unreason of barbarism."

== Initiation rites ==
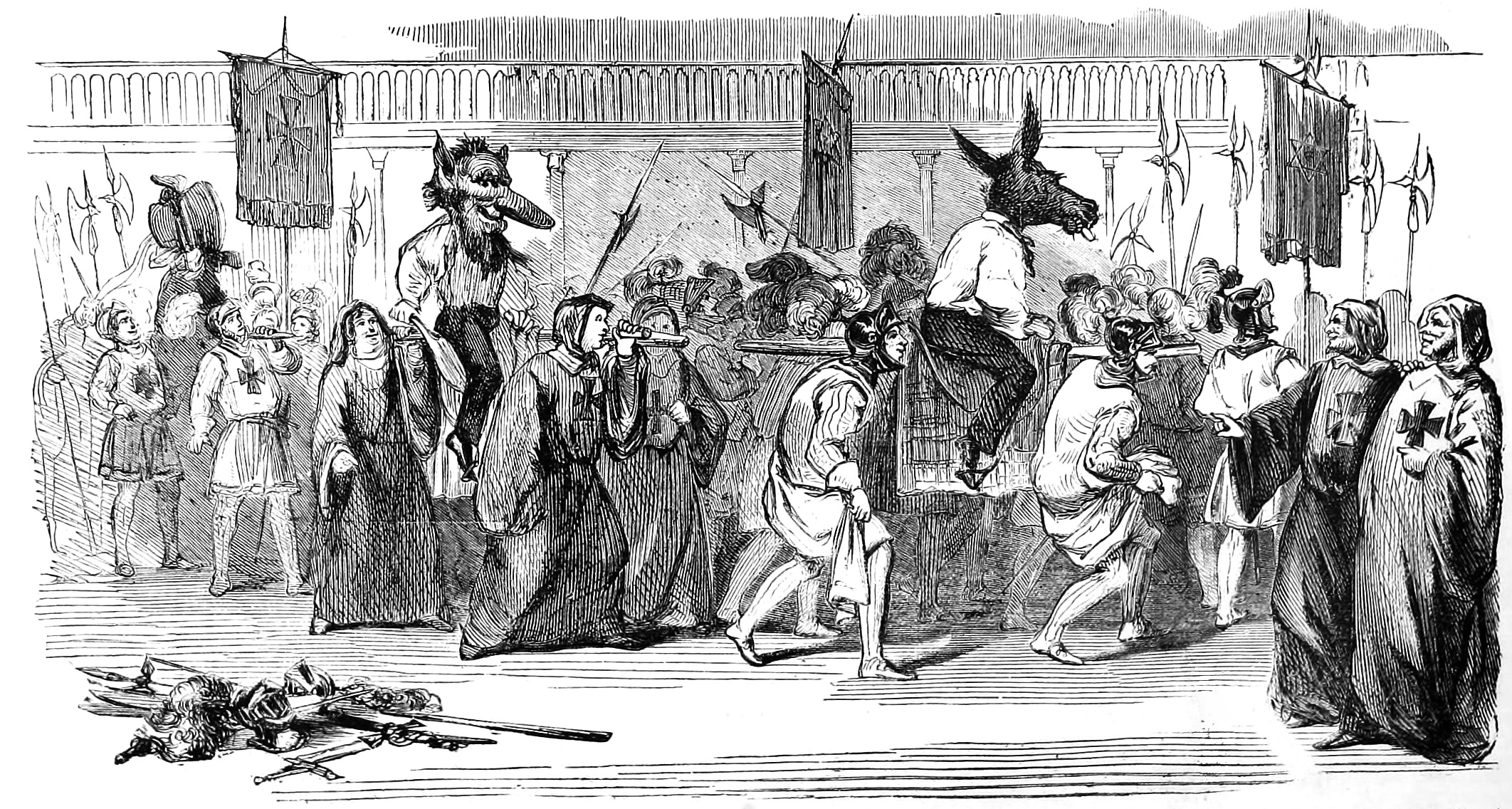
Exposure of the Sons of Malta—Horsing the candidate—‘Upon this I was made to stride; a pummel being in front of me, which I was told to hold on to, as the horse (!) kicked!’—note by a victim

In late 1859, the Zanesville Aurora, of Zanesville, Ohio, published an account of the Sons of Malta's initiation entitled "SONS OF MALTA. Grand Disclosures of the Ceremonies and Mysteries of the Wonderful Order. FUN AND MORE FUN." Although other extant accounts indicate that the initiation sometimes varied in particulars from lodge to lodge, this seems fairly typical:

"In almost every town and city in this country, there is a lodge of the Sons of Malta. This mysterious order took its rise in New Orleans some three or four years ago. There are two accounts given of its origin. It is said, by one account, to have originated with the army of 'Walker the Filibuster,' at the time that worthy was preparing to take Cuba. Another account says it originated during the ravages of the yellow fever, and was intended to divert the minds of the frightened people, as well as to supply a fund for charitable purposed-such as burying the homeless dead, &c.

"However it may have originated, it is not the order that outsiders take it to be; as we shall presently show.

"One of the brethren, who has been turned out of the important and secret office, the initials of which are 'G. R. J. A.,' has taken offense at the order, and communicated to us the whole proceedings--pass word, grips, signs, &c.

"When about to become a member of the I. O. S. M., (Independent Order Sons Malta,) the candidate or candidates presents himself or themselves in an outer room, where he meets a committee of officers of the Lodge, who come to him out of the lodge--room, with drawn swords in their hands, and a kind of three--barred sheet iron hats on, which hide their faces; these officers put test questions to each candidate; and any candidate who hesitates or falters is allowed to depart in peace; those who remain pay $5 each, and the committee returns to the lodge-room to report on the cases and have them balloted for.

"The funds thus raised pay the rent of the room, and the balance is expended in charities; there are no other dues, for reasons which will appear hereafter.

"After the candidates are balloted for and elected, the Grand Conductor goes out to the anteroom and escorts the candidates to the inside entrance door, where he pounds on the door with the hilt of his sword three times; the inside sentinel raises a little slide in the door-peeps out; and the chief officer from the inside asks in a loud voice:

"'What is the cause of this hub-bub?' The sentinel answers: 'Strangers coming into camp!' To which the Chief replies: 'Let 'em rip.'

"What a sight breaks upon their vision! The room is nearly dark, and is only lighted by a lamp of alcohol, which sits upon a coffin in the middle of the room, and thrown its blue, flickering light around the scene! The members dressed as our citizens have seen them upon the streets, are ranged around the room, thus: One lies upon his back like a corpse, another kneels down upon his knee beside him in the attitude of a mourner. All is still as a tomb around the room, except in the center where the coffin lies upon the bier and the pale lamp flickers upon the scene. Beside that coffin, which is covered with a pall or black cloth, marches an old man who carries a musket and bayonet upon his shoulder—an old man whose white locks of hair hang in weird and tangled masses about his neck—with his left hand he snatches unmeaningly at his hair, and then mutters to himself as he turns upon his heel with military precision and marches back and forth, passing and repassing the black palled coffin and flickering light. At either end of the coffin stands a figure draped in white from head to foot, with uplifted hands and upturned eyes, muttering lips from which no sounds issue, and nothing of the face visible but the eyes and mouth. At one end of the room sits the Chief—blazing in red and gold colors but motionless—at the other end sits a skeleton with a gilded crown upon his head; with on bony hand pointing upward, while with the other he clasps to his fleshless lips the figure of an infant-at either side of the room sits the Grand Chancellor and Recorder. Each and all as motionless as the coffin or the skeleton.

"Around the coffin the candidates march in an oblong ring, passing fartherest from the coffin an nearest to the members and officers—thus leaving the old man room to pace to and fro up and down the room. The Grand Conductor marches with drawn sword at the head, and the Grand Sergeant of the sappers and miners marches also with drawn sword at the tail of the line of candidates for initiation. Three times round the line marches—twice in painful silence, through which nothing is heard but the clanking of sword scabbards as they strike, at each step, the legs of the Conductor and Sergeant—during the third round an organ or melodeon strikes up a low, wailing, tremulous, wild, hollow tune, which is echoed back by the members in a low death song, while the old man marches more rapidly and mutters louder and louder, until as the candidates finish the last round, the G. C. (as the Chief is called) says in a deep voice, 'Peace, venerable father! Life is made up of sorrow, and the world is ripening for sorrow greater than thine! Peace! Peace! Be still thou wounded heart!' To which all the members respond: 'Peace! Peace! Be still!'--then the music stops, and the old man resumes his quiet march.

"The candidates are now arranged around the G. R., who questions them as to their motive and intentions. If the answers are satisfactory (as they always are) the candidates are conducted to the chair of the skeleton where a person hidden behind the grim figure, administers an obligation to each, which binds him from his cradle (represented by the infant!) never to divulge what he may there see and learn.

"After assuming the obligations the candidates are conducted back to the G. C. through the same scene of silence and sorrow, who gives them some advice, after which they are conducted out to the ante-room. And this ends the first scene.

"SCENE SECOND.

"After the candidates go out and the door is closed, the members in an instant spring to their feet, light up the room, throw off their gowns, put away the coffin, &c., and prepare for fun. In the meantime the candidates are being blindfolded so that they cannot see; in this condition they are conducted to the door again by the same parties as before; the door is again rapped upon, and, this time, the G. C. says in a loud voice: 'What is it makes the alarm!' To which the Sentinel replies: 'Friends! Who will do us no harm!' To which the G. C. answers: 'Bid them, Beware! Beware! And welcome them to enter here!'

"The candidates are then led in, in single file, each holding the coat-tail of the other. In total blindness they are thus marched about the room several times while the room is lighted brilliantly. All is now silence and grins--except on the part of the candidates, who are sternly commanded to indulge in 'No Levity' They are brought to the chair of the Grand Commander, where they are asked all manner of questions touching their fitness to bear arms, to swim, to march, as to the condition of their health, teeth, &c., &c.--as to their moral character--whether they have been, or are, intemperate--whether they have overstepped the bounds of chastity, and so on. In order to get this information, one of the previously initiated heads the line and stammers out answers to the questions, gradually and painfully making himself out a mighty bad fellow. The others, who are blinded and cannot see, of course hold themselves in honor bound to speak out the whole truth in such a solemn place as they imagine this still to be--as they cannot see how the scene has changed. At each answer the G. C. says 'let it be recorded,' and the recorder sings out in a low, hollow tone, as he writes it down in a great book. 'It has been so recorded!'

"During these questions the candidates are tried to test their ability to swim, to play the drum or instruments--and it must be amusing to see staid, sober citizens lying down face foremost on the floor, and “striking out” as if swimming for dear life from Florida to Cuba, as well as going through the other feats of a similar ridiculous character. But then, each man thinks, we suppose, that he must do as all good “Sons of Malta” have done before him, and therefore he goes the whole figure.

"After enough of the above questions are asked and answered, the candidates take another solemn obligation having reference to the conquest of Cuba, which is administered to them in their blind state, while each places his hand upon a big book, which is always carried in procession, and which contains nothing but the pictures of two Jackasses, one in the prime of life and the other in a rapid decline.

"After this the candidates are told that they must retire for a moment and prepare to go through a trying ordeal, which will severely test their nerves and manhood.

"They retire, and so ends scene second.

"SCENE THIRD.

"The candidates are now brought in one at a time, still blindfolded. Each candidate is brought in, rapidly marched around the room, double quick time, between two guards, and is then made to run up a steeply inclined ladder composed of rollers, which are set close together, and which turn under his feet at every step and make his legs fly past each other like spokes of a run away buggy—when he gets to the top of the ladder he lands upon a platform, where stand two more guards, who turn him about and tell him to sit down; he sits down, and they give him a shove down the ladder over the rollers. Without any sled, he rides this way to the bottom of the ladder, where he strikes a springing board, just as it is jerked up by two stout men, which sends him with a bound up towards the ceiling of the room-as he comes down he is caught upon the board in a sitting posture-one of his legs is then pulled about, so that he is astride the board; and in this condition he is carried around the room in a procession of the members, while drums and gongs are being beaten in a most furious manner.

"By this time the candidate, blind as he is, begins to see through the matter; and gets scared or riled according to the state of his feelings, but it is too late to stop.

"After taking him round the room on the board, the G. C. says, 'let the cavern be opened,' and at that moment the board is lowered at one end and hoisted at the other, and the candidate slides down to the mouth of a large sheet iron cylinder—something similar to the smoke-stack of a steamboat—and as he slides down a rough voice whispers in his ear, 'Crawl for your life'--following this advice, he crawls through the thing, while all hands are pounding on the outside of it with sticks—just as he comes out he is taken, again up the steep ladder of rollers to the platform at the top. He is now told to stand up, straight, and divest himself of all matter that will spoil by coming into contact with water. While he is being thus prepared for the water the members have got ready a large canvas sheet with rope all round it; this is placed behind him, and held outstretched by as many men as can get hold of the ropes; as soon as all is ready, the candidate is thrown from the platform back upon this sheet, and away he goes—up and down—no sooner down than up again—like Sancho Panza tossed in a blanket—until the members get tired tossing him, at which time he is let down upon a mattress; from which he is lifted back upon the platform, where he is set upon the top roller with his feet directed toward the bottom, an umbrella without any covering is then hoisted and given to him, in his left hand, while in his right hand is placed a cow-bell-he is told to hold up the umbrella and ring the bell, and thus sails down over the rollers into a tub, full of wet sponges, at the bottom. Here the blinds are taken from his eyes, and he beholds himself surrounded by about fifty persons, in their shirt sleeves, all laughing at him.

"At first the candidate is astonished, then he gets angry, and finally he laughs with the rest, and becomes a zealous member of the Venerable Order.

"He is then instructed how he is to get into the lodge. He is instructed to the outside door, sneeze twice and rap once; at this the sentinel raises the slide or wicket in the door, and the candidate says 'Squi,' to which the sentinel says 'Bob,' then both say 'Squibob,' and the member enters. He then advances to the inside door where he sneezes once and blows his nose and raps, at which the slide is lifted and the candidate says 'Lager,' to which the sentinel responds 'Beer,' and then both say 'Swei Glass,' and the candidate enters-proceeds to the center of the room, where he flaps his two open hands at the top of his head, after the manner of a jackass flapping his ears, and takes his seat. These signs will give admission into any lodge of the Sons in the world, if they are properly given."

According to subsequent newspaper accounts, this information was leaked by a Son of Malta named Curtis who subsequently disappeared, leading to comparisons with the disappearance of Morgan after disclosing Masonic secrets, until it was announced by Mrs. Curtis that she had revealed the secrets after undergoing the initiation in male disguise and that her husband had run off after she had revealed her identity to him: "I just whispered a word or two in his ear, and maybe he didn't pull off his gown and hood in short order, and walk home with me. He left me that night in anger and mortification, and I have not seen him since."

An additional detail given by K.Loric: "Finally, as a grand wind-up, the candidate was informed that, in view of the fact that he had suffered so many indignities and passed through such a trying ordeal, the lodge had decided to confer upon him the honorary title of G.R.J.A.—Judge, or General, or Colonel So-and-so having resigned the position in his favor. With a lengthy and florid speech...the candidate was presented with his credentials...Hastily the 'great seal' of the order would be broken, the certificate taken from the envelope and opened, when the victim would discover the picture of a jackass in bold relief..."

== Decline ==
In January and February 1860, Frank Leslie's New York Illustrated Weekly ran a series of articles condemning the Sons of Malta as an organization encouraging immorality and published a detailed account of their initiation. This is generally considered to have dealt a fatal blow to the S.O.M. (Note: "A year or so after Plymouth [Indiana] lodge was organized, Frank Leslie's New York Illustrated Weekly published the ritual in full, illustrating the scenes through which the candidate seeking. to penetrate the arcana of mysteries, or 'powers of numbers,' had to pass, giving all the signs, grips and passwords and everything else connected with its secret workings. This was the death knell of the order, and the members of Plymouth lodge decided to surrender the 'charter,' and close up the affairs of the lodge.")

Another cause claimed for the organization's decline was the paralysis and eventual death of George Harding resulting from his initiatory hazing at the Lafayette, Indiana: "Harding was an intensely earnest man, and took the initiation to be a serious affair; being told by the grand conductor that from the elevated railway he would be plunged into a lake, he contracted his muscles and nerved himself for the battle with the waves. When he struck the [wet] blanket the shock was too great for his nerves...His sufferings and death were the death knell of the Sons of Malta, not only in Lafayette, but throughout the United States.

A third factor is cited by The Cyclopædia of Fraternities: "When the available material at a given city or town was exhausted, Councils of the Sons of Malta naturally became dormant and ultimately died out. Existing only to initiate, they became extinct when candidates were scarce."

A National Encampment (also called a "Grand Encampment" in some newspaper reports) was held in Washington, D.C. on Feb. 15, 1860, "the object being a thorough revision of the laws and ritual of the order." Representatives from the National Encampment were received by President Buchanan: "So solemn was the scene that several portly delegates were evidently convulsed with emotion (or secret laughter), and the Union was regarded as safe. Owners of ships, stocks, States, and the Order took courage," as Benjamin Poore later wrote in his recollections.

Despite the efforts of the National Encampment, many or most S.O.M. lodges gave up their charters, if they had them, or otherwise ceased to function soon after the New York Illustrated Weekly articles appeared.

- Two days after reporting on the National Encampment, the Cincinnati Daily Press printed the item: "The two lodges of the Sons of Malta in Providence, R.I., have ceased to be. The order seems fading out fast.
- The Fort Scott, Kansas, lodge disbanded in April of 1860: "This lodge was kept up until April, 1860, when we had succeeded in initiating about every man that was in town. At the closing up they had a torch-light procession and marched around the Fort parade ground several times, each member carrying a roll of paper...after a speech by Wyllys Ransom, who was the grand master, explaining the aims of the lodge had been accomplished, and for fear the outside world might get hold of the records they would now burn them..." After solemnly burning the "records" the lodge members returned to their hall, where the ladies of the town met them for a dance.

The Sons of Malta did not completely disappear immediately after the articles in the New York Illustrated Weekly, however:

- There were still lodges in St. Joseph, Missouri and Leavenworth, Kansas in December 1860, though very much in decline. An item in the December 12, 1860, Daily Times of Leavenworth headed "SONS OF MALTA" reads, "The St. Joseph 'Gazette' says that 'this ancient and honorable institution has not been in a very flourishing condition' in that city, and that the treasury is empty. We regret to say that the 'Sons' in this neighborhood are in no better circumstances." The Easton, PA, Minehaha Lodge, founded in 1857, was the final lodge in existence when it closed in 1903.
- The New York Advertiser of February 27, 1861, carried a piece titled, "The last of the Sons of Malta," detailing the end of New York City's Pro Patria Lodge. (Note: The 'ancient and honorable order of the Sons of Malta,' which is represented as being 'ancient because the memory of man knoweth not its origin, and honorable because the great and wise of every age have been numbered with its firm and steadfast supporters,' came to a complete, if not inglorious end, this forenoon. The furniture of Pro Patria Lodge, the largest, most thoroughly equipped, and most famous in the United States, was sold at auction, under mortgage, at 11 o'clock, together with all the regalia and warlike implements, which seem to have entered largely into the initiatory services of this mystic brotherhood. The sale occurred in the lodge-room, a spacious hall at 814 Broadway, the first floor from the roof and the fifth from the earth.--The hall was fitted up in a peculiar style of elegance. The floor was richly carpeted, and the room was surrounded by long sofas, white the walls were decorated with twenty-four knights in armor, with tapestry, and with the red cross of St. John, which appears to have been the symbol of the order. The articles sold were classified as follows: 1st, the useful; 2d, the instrumental; 3d, the ornamental and mystical. Under the first head, were sold the sofas, chairs, carpets, &c, one of the carpets containing three hundred yards, and selling for seventy-five cents the yard, half what it cost. Under the second head were sold an Alexandria organ, which was started at $50, and sold at $90. Also, a Chinese gong, which, the 'brothers' assert, was formerly owned by the Emperor Chow Chow, and which brought $11. An immense tin trumpet and a quantity of horns were also sold, for a trifle. Under the third head were sold five 'bloodless swords.' When the auctioneer reached these articles, one of the initiated called out at the top of his voice, 'Now left the stranger feel the height of the sword! Now, stranger, be strong and brave, and leap with all your might, for this will put your courage to the test!'--whereupon, those who appeared to understand it laughed heartily, and outsiders concluded that this must have been a part of the initiation ceremonies. According to the handbill, these swords were 'made of Damascus steel, and used in the terrible wars of the Knights of Malta, with roast beet and plum pudding, eighteen hundred years before the deluge,' and 'were presented to Pro Patria Lodge by Alexander the Great.' Among them was said to be the celebrated sword which was suspended by a single thread The purchasers, however, did not seem to be impressed with their great value for the five swords only brought five dollars. Then there were five terrible tin spears, which were sold in a lot for four shillings.--Then seven helmets, said to have descended from the Crusaders, under Peter the Hermit, with vizors complete, were also sold in a lot for the same amount. Then came the mail and armor, which went on like easy terms, five or six shillings paying for the whole.--Next were sold eight rusty muskets, with fixed bayonets, four shillings each. Several hundred dominoes, with cowls, black and white, were sold at twelve and fifteen cents apiece. 'The Rugged Path' was not sold, but judging from its appearance the 'strangers' who passed over it must have had a rough journey over the rollers. After the furniture and other articles named had been sold, the auctioneer withdrew to the back room, and proceeded to sell regalia, which he said must not be exposed to the gaze of the uninitiated. The mystic volume, said to be a large illustrated octave work, was sold unseen. The 'sacred bath,' however, was displayed to the crowd. It sold for $1.50, and appeared to be nothing more nor less than a large punch bowl. In conclusion, the 'brothers' joined in a song, to the tune of 'Auld Lang Syne,' beginning-- 'When old Maltesia first was born.' The crowd dispersed; and thus ends the mystic brotherhood of the I. O. S. M.")
- The Easton, PA, Minehaha Lodge, founded in 1857, was the final lodge in existence when it closed in 1903.

== Revivals ==
The New Orleans Time-Picayune of Dec 27, 1866, reported "The Order of the Sons of Malta is to be revived in Richmond," and the Biennial Report of the Secretary of State of the State of Texas (1894) contains a listing for the Grand Lodge of the Sons of Malta in Houston, their charter having been filed with the Secretary of State on June 28, 1879. To what extent these were genuine revivals, rather than organizations inspired by the Sons of Malta's humbuggery, is difficult to determine, though at least some of the "revived" Sons of Malta used different designation for their officers than the original I.S.O.M.

A group called the Sons of Adam was established in Parsons, Kansas in 1879 by several prominent businessmen, including Masons. The order is supposed to have had the same raison d'être as the Sons of Malta and early Ku Klux Klan. It had a "brief, but eventful career."

== See also ==
- E Clampus Vitus
