= Sonoma County Historical Society =

Organization in California

- Abbreviation: SCHS
- Established: 1962
- Founded at: Santa Rosa, California
- Legal status: Official Sonoma County historical society
- Purpose: Preserving and promoting Sonoma County history.
- Headquarters: Santa Rosa, California
- President: Ray Johnson
- Secretary, Acting: Sharie Sbrazza
- Publication: Sonoma Historian
- Website: Official website

The Sonoma County Historical Society (SCHS) is the county-wide historical society in Sonoma County, California. It is dedicated to the preservation and public access to historical sites, materials and documents.

== History ==
The SCHS was founded in 1962 in Santa Rosa, California, at the suggestion of Mrs. Walter Nagle. The founding members were Mrs. Nagle, Mrs. Jeanne Thurlow Miller, Mr. William Borba, Mrs. William Lippincott, Mr. Burton Travis, Mr. Harvey Hansen, Mr. Edward Fratini and Mrs. Edward Connor. The Society was formally registered with the California Secretary of State on August 30, 1963. The SCHS was organized "to collect and preserve journals, manuscripts, maps, diaries, portraits, genealogies and other articles or materials which establish the history of California, particularly Sonoma County."

For many years, the SCHS was a partner in the Codding Museum in Santa Rosa. The Museum was located at 557 Summerfield Road in Santa Rosa. The Museum closed in 1989 and the SCHS turned its collections over to the Museum of Sonoma County in 1989

For more than 10 years, the SCHS held its 25-mile hike, first led by Jeff Tobes, then conducted in honor of the late Mr. Tobes. The hikes alternated between varying Sonoma County sites and San Francisco sites.

== Activities ==
The SCHS is noted for its annual luncheon, historic awards program and annual picnic.

The Society's publications have been called the "newsletter" until 1980, "The Journal" from 1981 to 2001 and "Sonoma Historian" beginning in 2002.

In early August 2022, the SCHS held Finding History Day in Santa Rosa. Nearly 40 historical and cultural groups exhibited documents, photos and other items and invited the public to join in learning their heritages. Nine 1/2 hour presentations were presented in a separate room. The Sonoma County Library joined in as a principle sponsor and five other groups contributed as sponsors.

== See also ==
- List of historical societies in California
