= Los Angeles Conservancy =

Historic preservation organization

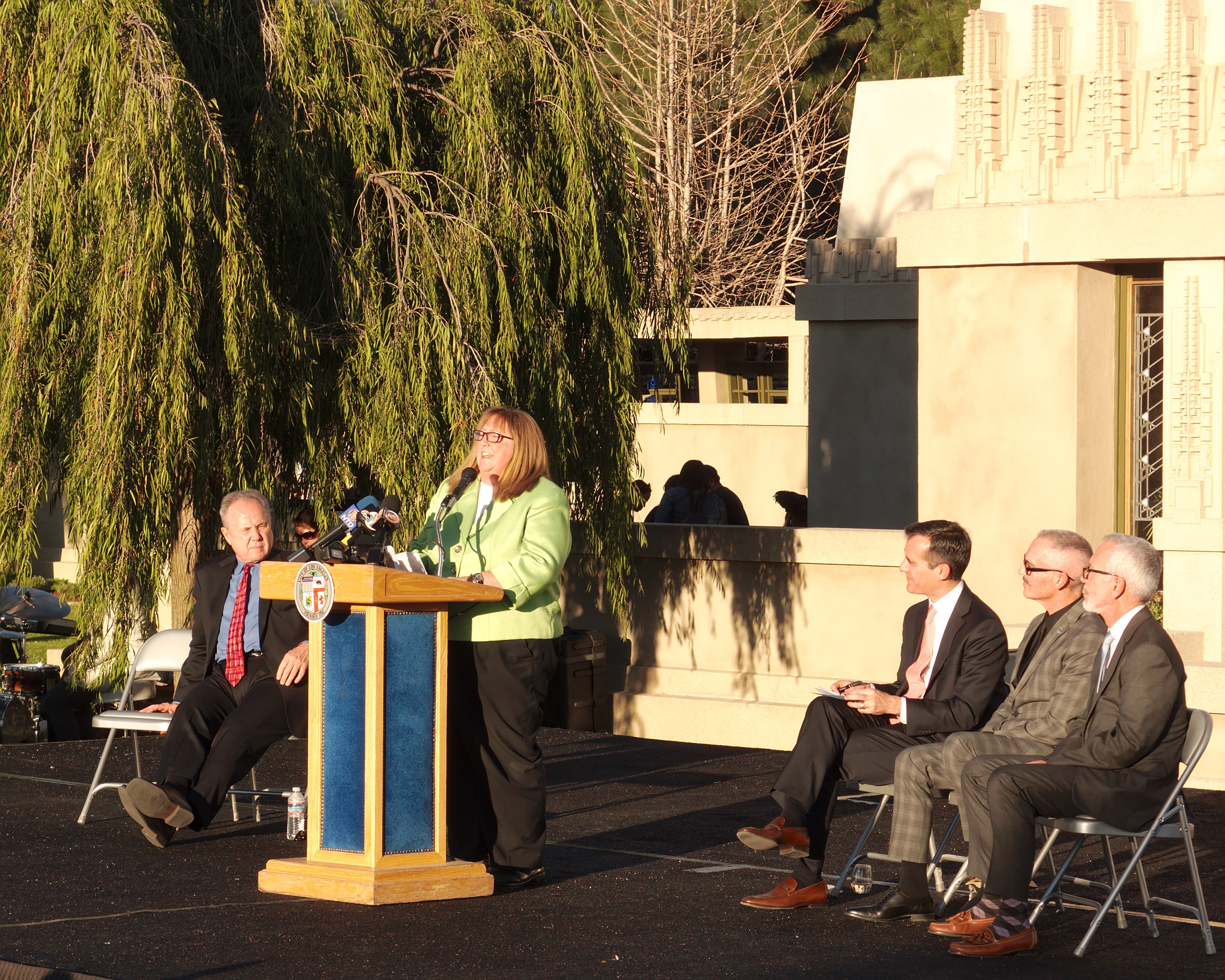
- Former executive director Linda Dishman speaking at ribbon-cutting ceremony for Hollyhock House
- Formation: 1978
- Location: Los Angeles, California, United States
- Services: Historical preservation
- Official language: English
- Website: laconservancy.org

The Los Angeles Conservancy is a historic preservation organization in Los Angeles, California, that works to document, rescue and revitalize historic buildings, places and neighborhoods in the city.

The Los Angeles Conservancy is the largest membership based historic preservation organization in the country. The group was formed in 1978 to preserve Los Angeles Central Library, which was threatened with demolition. The organization has over 7000 members and 400 volunteers. There used to be a volunteer Modern Committee, dedicated to the preservation of post-war architecture as well as a Historic Theaters Committee that produces the annual "Last Remaining Seats" film series of classic films in the historic movie palaces in downtown Los Angeles. The Conservancy hosts an annual preservation awards ceremony at the Millennium Biltmore Hotel and works closely with the business, political and development communities to find preservation solutions for historic buildings.

Some of the Conservancy's biggest success stories have included Bullocks Wilshire, the Cathedral of Saint Vibiana, the Wiltern Theatre and the oldest operating McDonald's in Downey, California.

In 2006, the Los Angeles Conservancy won the American Planning Association's Daniel Burnham award, its most prestigious National Planning award.

Linda Dishman served as president and CEO from 1992-2024. Effective January 1, 2024, Adrian Scott Fine became president and CEO of the Conservancy.

== See also ==
- List of historical societies in California
