= Hans Halberstadt (author) =

American documentary filmmaker

- Born: Hans Milton Halberstadt; February 29, 1944 (age 82); Plainfield, New Jersey
- Occupations: Author, filmmaker, historian and photographer
- Known for: Authored and co-authored more than 60 non-fiction books

Hans Milton Halberstadt (born February 29, 1944) is an American author, filmmaker, historian and photographer. He has authored and co-authored more than 60 non-fiction books, many of them documenting the American military.

His books have been translated into several languages, including German, French and Japanese. Halberstadt's books focus on portraits of military units, the mindset of modern warriors, equipment, tactics and missions.

His early career centered on creating short films for the educational market and for corporate clients. He belongs to a number of organizations, including E Clampus Vitus, the UDT/SEAL Association, Association of the US Army (Life), and Author's Guild.

== Background ==
Halberstadt was born in Plainfield, New Jersey, the oldest son of photographer Milton H. Halberstadt (Hal) and Olga Navratil Halberstadt. His family moved to California about 1945, where he was raised in Marin County and graduated from Tamalpais High School. His early years were spent working in his father's photography studio in San Francisco where he was introduced to artists including Ansel Adams, Dorothea Lange, Imogen Cunningham, Benny Bufano, Keith Munro and architects Lawrence Halprin and Doug Bayliss.

He joined the army in 1962 and went to Vietnam where he served as a helicopter door gunner throughout the Central Highlands.

After his years in service, Halberstadt returned to California and graduated from San Francisco State in 1968 with a degree in film and broadcasting.

== Career ==
Halberstadt worked for Skidmore, Owings & Merrill in Washington DC as a photographer. When this project ended, he moved back to California, and started his Company Very Moving Pictures. He produced television commercials, public relations films, corporate and educational films, videos and audio/visual presentations for clients including Exxon, Bank of America, Ketchum Communications and Discovery Toys. He made nearly 40 educational films for Arthur Barr Productions, Inc. Of Pasadena.

His first foray into publishing was providing the illustrations for a book on stained glass, Stained Glass, Music for the Eye in 1979. This book was favorably reviewed by Newsweek Magazine, which called Halberstadt's photographs "dazzling".

His first authored book was Coast Guard, Always Ready, about the United States Coast Guard. He has since written, co-written or illustrated more than 70 non-fiction books. Many of his books are about special operations units such as United States Navy Seals and Green Berets. Other subjects include Railroad depots, seaplanes, Farming and locomotives. His publishers include Barnes & Noble, Motorbooks Publishing, Presidio Press, Trident Publishing.

== Books by Hans Halberstadt ==
- ABRAMS Company (Windrow & GreenE)
- Airborne – Assault FROM THE SKY (Presidio Press)
- Airborne (ILLUSTRATED AIR Combat SERIES) (Presidio Press)
- American Civil War – THE SOLDIER'S STORY (Windrow & Greene)
- American Family Farm, THE (2003 MBI—Motorbooks)
- American Fire Engine, The (MBI—Motorbooks)
- American Railroad (Co-Author Howard Ande) (Tankobon)
- American Train Depot & Roundhouse (MBI—Motorbooks)
- Army (2006 Windrow & GreenE)
- Army Aviation (Presidio Press)
- Battle Rattle (2006 Windrow & Greene)
- Bradley Company (2001 Windrow & Greene)
- CESSNA Buyer's Guide (MBI—Motorbooks)
- Classic Trains (2003 Metrobooks)
- Combines and Harvests (MBI—Motorbooks)
- Demolition Equipment (2005 MBI—Motorbooks)
- Desert Rats – THE BRITISH 4TH and 7TH ARMORED BRIGADES (MBI—Motorbooks)
- Desert Storm Ground War (1991 MBI—Motorbooks)
- F-111 Aardvark (Windrow & Greene)
- F-15 Strike Eagle (Windrow & Greene)
- Farm Memories (MBI—Motorbooks)
- Farm Tractors (MBI—Motorbooks)
- Giant Dump Trucks (MBI—Motorbooks)
- Green Berets – UNCONVENTIONAL Warriors (1988 Presidio Press)
- Green Berets, THE (MBI—Motorbooks)
- Indian Motorcycles (MBI—Motorbooks)
- Inside the Great Tanks (1997 Windrow & Greene)
- Inside the US Navy Seals (MBI—Motorbooks)
- Lock and Load (MBI—Motorbooks)
- Marine Muscle – HARRIER and HORNET (Windrow & Greene)
- MIG 29 (MBI—Motorbooks)
- Military Vehicles (1998 Metrobooks)
- Modern Diesel Locomotives (2006 MBI—Motorbooks)
- NTC – A Primer OF Modern Land Combat (Presidio Press)
- Orchard Tractors (MBI—Motorbooks)
- Piper Buyer's Guide (MBI—Motorbooks)
- Plows and Planters (MBI—Motorbooks)
- Red Star Fighters and Ground Attach (1994 Windrow & Greene)
- Roughneck Nine One Co-Author Frank Antenori (2007 ST. MARTIAN'S PRESS)
- Seaplane (Metrobooks)
- Stained Glass – Music for the Eye Co-Authors Bob and Jill Hill Scrimshaw (1976 Bob and Jill Hill Scrimshaw)
- Steam Tractors (MBI—Motorbooks)
- Sub Busters (MBI—Motorbooks)
- SUKHOI 27 (MBI—Motorbooks)
- SWAT – Special Weapons and Tactics (MBI—Motorbooks)
- Threshers and Combines (MBI—Motorbooks)
- To Be a Military Sniper Co-Author Gregory Mast (2007 MBI—Motorbooks)
- To Be an Army Paratrooper Co-Author Gregory Mast (2007 MBI—Motorbooks)
- Tractors Co-Author April Halberstadt (Metrobooks)
- Train Depots and Roundhouses (MBI—Motorbooks)
- Trigger Men (2010 ST. MARTIN'S PRESS)
- Under Cover (Simon & Schuster POCKETBOOKS)
- US Aircrew Combat Flight and Survival Gear Co-Author Michael Halberstadt (Windrow & Greene)
- US Navy Seals (MBI—Motorbooks)
- US Navy Seals (Bin Laden Edition) (MBI—Motorbooks)
- US Navy Seals in Action, first edition (MBI—Motorbooks)
- USCG – Always Ready (Presidio Press)
- USMC (MBI—Motorbooks)
- War Stories of the Green Berets, FIRST EDITION (MBI—Motorbooks)
- War Stories of the Green Berets, SECOND EDITION (2004 MBI—Motorbooks)
- Wild Weasels (MBI—Motorbooks)
- Woodies Metrobooks
- Working Steam (2003 MBI—Motorbooks)
- World's Great Artillery, The (2002 CROWOOD PRESS)
