= Humboldt County Historical Society =

Historical society in California

Coordinates: 40.8000°N 124.1631°W

Humboldt County Historical Society (HCHS)
- Formation: 1947
- Type: Historical Society
- Headquarters: Gross-Wells-Barnum House
- Location(s): 703 8th St; Eureka, California
- Members: c. 3,000
- Website: HCHS

The Humboldt County Historical Society (HCHS) is a regional historical society, primarily focused on the history of Humboldt County, California. Offices, bookstore, collections, and research staff are located in Eureka.

== Overview ==
The society is open to requests by the public for research in the society's collection, which consists mostly of documents. HCHS also provides a number of educational opportunities, including frequent public talks on various aspects of Humboldt County History, and publishes a quarterly journal and books.

=== Mission ===
The society provides the following statement of purpose: The HCHS shall further an understanding and appreciation of all peoples, places, events, and activities of Humboldt County and related areas. The society shall accomplish this by acquiring, creating, preserving, interpreting and disseminating historical information and by assisting others to do the same.

== Gross-Wells-Barnum House ==
The society offices are housed in the former home of the late Helen Wells Barnum, previous owner of the historic Eureka Inn. Built by her maternal grandparents, Dr. and Mrs. Reuben Gross, in 1902, the beautiful two-story Colonial Revival style house was donated to the Society in 1993 through Mrs. Barnum's estate. Much of the lower floor of the home is open to the public during business hours.

== Bookstore ==
The HCHS bookstore offers the most extensive array of historical publications (over 100) and historic photos on the region.

== Historical publications ==
HCHS publishes the Humboldt Historian quarterly. The Historian has been in continuous publication since 1953. Subscription is included in the cost membership to the society. The scholarly journal features articles on Humboldt County history.

The HCHS bookstore offers the most extensive array of historical publications (over 100) and historic photos on the region.

== Collections ==
The Historical Society is the primary repository for print materials, maps, and photographs that have a bearing on Humboldt County history. To date there are more than 50 separate collections of documents cared for by the society.

The Society's Research Library contains collections of genealogical information as well as local history. The research library is available on a drop-in basis during our open hours. Research requests are best handled by mail or e-mail and non-members are charged fees.

== See also ==
- Clarke Historical Museum
- Humboldt Bay Maritime Museum
- List of historical societies in California
