= Carl Irving Wheat =

American cartographer

- Born: December 5, 1892; Holliston, Massachusetts, US
- Died: June 23, 1966 (aged 73); Menlo Park, California, US
- Education: Pomona College
- Occupation: Cartographic Historian
- Spouse: Helen Millspaugh
- Children: Francis Millspaugh Wheat (1921–2000) Author of California Desert Miracle: The Fight for Desert Parks and Wilderness; Richard Pierce Wheat (1924–)

Carl Irving Wheat (December 5, 1892 – June 23, 1966) was a California lawyer and historian and a historical cartographer of the American West.

== Early life ==
Wheat was born in Massachusetts to Congregational Church minister Frank Irving Wheat and Catherine Isabel Pearce on December 5, 1892. In 1898 his parents moved the family to San Francisco, then a few years later moved south near Pasadena. Wheat graduated from Pomona College in 1915 and was admitted to Harvard Law School. In 1917 he served as an ambulance driver during the First World War. Discharged from service, he resumed his education, married Helen Millspaugh on September 22, 1919, and took his LL.B. in 1920.

Wheat returned to California, where his legal practice centered on public and private utility law. He joined the California Railroad Commission in 1922, eventually becoming its chief counsel. He returned to private practice in San Francisco in 1929, then served on the legal staff of the Federal Communications Commission between 1936 and 1938. Until 1957 when he retired, Wheat interspersed public appointments with private legal activity.

== California history contributions ==
Wheat was a member of San Francisco's elite Bohemian Club and participated activity in its encampments. He also participated in the resurrection of E Clampus Vitus. Through his social activity he was introduced to Henry R. Wagner, who introduced his friend to history and the California Historical Society. Wheat was editor for the Society's journal between 1927 and 1933, which was the year he moved to Los Angeles. Wheat continued to contribute to the California Historical Society Quarterly with such articles as Pioneer Visitors to Death Valley After the Forty-Niners (September, 1939).

While in Los Angeles, Wheat served on the publication committee of the Historical Society of Southern California where he published The Forty-Niners in Death Valley: A Tentative Census (1939). In 1949 he published a bibliography of work on the Gold Rush, Books of the California Gold Rush.

== Frémont-Gibbs-Smith Map ==
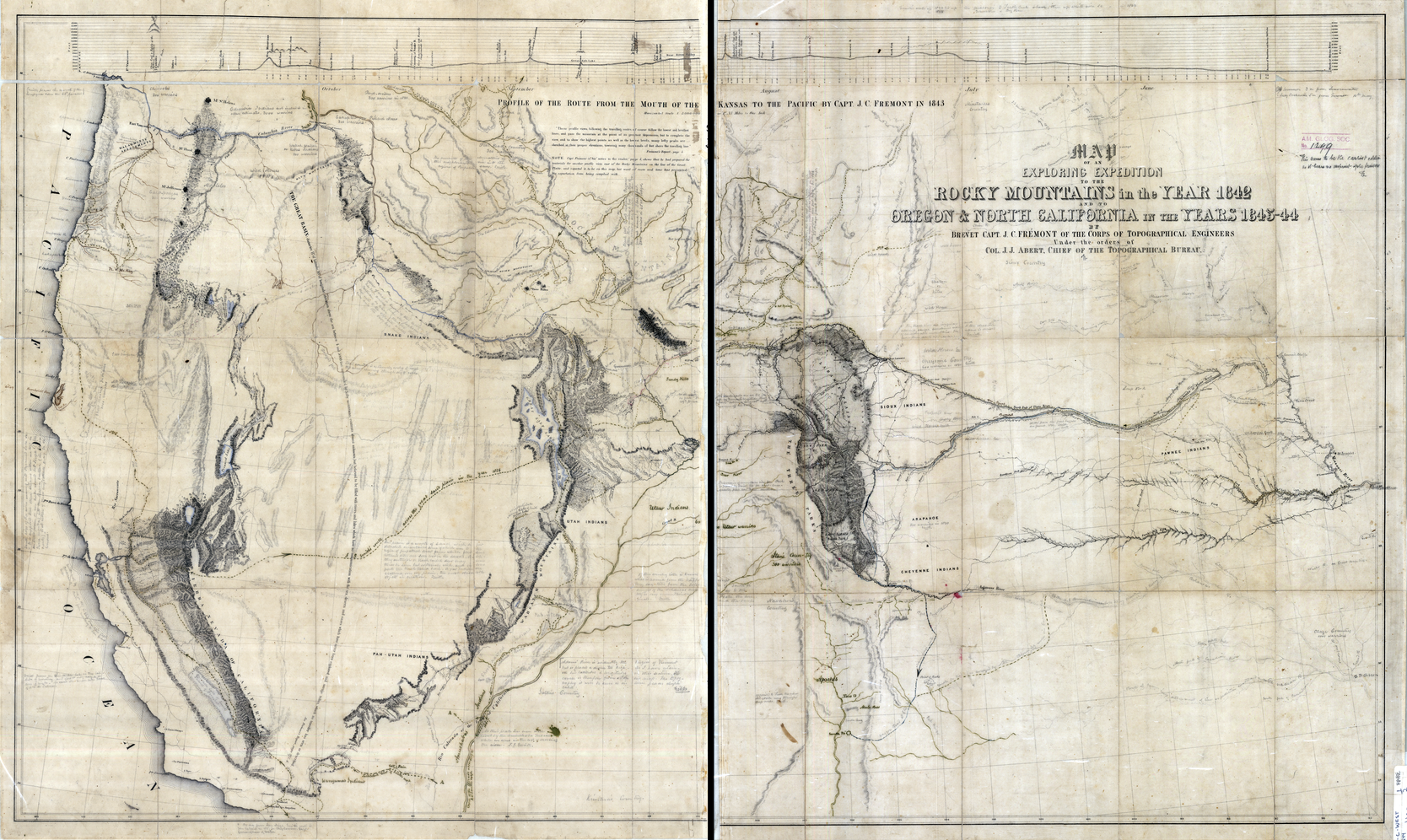
Fremont/Smith/Gibbs map

In October 1950, Wheat was elected to membership in the American Antiquarian Society. Around that time, he had begun compiling information for his milestone work: Mapping the Transmississippi West, 1540–1861. In 1953 he rediscovered a copy of the 1847 Frémont map in the collection of the American Geographical Society that bore manuscript emendations by George Gibbs. Gibbs had transferred the data onto the map from an unknown source. The penciled additions showed the travels by western explorer and fur trader Jedediah Smith. Wheat spoke extensively of the map in a paper delivered to the American Antiquarian Society in 1954.

With the help of Smith biographer and Bancroft Library historian Dale L. Morgan, Wheat was able to show that the emendations were likely a transcription from a long-lost map by Smith from the late 1820s. The pair released their findings in California Historical Society special publication Jedediah Smith and His Maps of the American West in 1954, the year after Morgan's Jedediah Smith and the Opening of the West (Bobbs-Merrill, 1953) appeared in print.

== Mapping the Transmississippi West ==
Mapping the Transmississippi West, 1540–1861, appeared in five folio volumes (the last in two parts) between 1957 and 1963. Written with the research and editorial cooperation of Dale Morgan, the volumes describe unfolding geographic knowledge and important maps of the West's exploration and migration, from the Spanish discovery to the opening of the Civil War. Wheat incorporated and financed the Institute for Historical Cartography as the first volume was going to press in an effort to guarantee publication of the massive volumes and to dodge the onus of self publication.

Wheat suffered a stroke in June 1955, which delayed production of his historical cartography. He recovered physically, but in August the same year suffered a second stroke which left him only limited use of his right hand. He dictated much of volumes 2–4 to a secretary, correcting proofs left-handed. In May 1961 Wheat suffered a third stroke that completely incapacitated him. Morgan, who had participated as a confidant and editor for most of the work but remained in the background, produced the two-part fifth and concluding volume from Wheat's collection of map, map photostats, notes, and his own massive research files.

Carl Wheat suffered a fifth, massive stroke in June 1966 and died at home several weeks later. His papers are archived in the Bancroft Library

== Honorariums ==
Wheat served as a Trustee of Pomona College and was awarded an honorary degree from that institution in 1959. The same year, he was awarded the Henry R. Wagner Memorial Award from the California Historical Society.

== Select publications ==
- The Rocky-Bar Mining Company: An Episode of Early Western Promotion and Finance California Historical Quarterly (1933)
- Wheat, Carl I. (June 1939). "Trailing the Forty-Niners through Death Valley". Sierra Club Bulletin. XXIV (3).
- The Maps of the California Gold Region, 1848–1857: A Biblio-cartography of an Important Decade 1942.
- The Pioneer Press of California (1948)
- The first one hundred years of Yankee California : address at the opening of the Library of Congress California centennial exhibit, November 12, 1949 (1949)
- Carl I. Wheat. Books of the California Gold Rush: A Centennial Selection. San Francisco: Colt Press, 1949.
- Wheat, Carl I.; Morgan, Dale L. (1954). Jedediah Smith and His Maps of the American West. Los Angeles: California Historical Society.
- Carl I. Wheat, Mapping the Transmississippi West, 1540–1861, 5 v. in 6. San Francisco: Institute for Historical Cartography, 1957–1963.
