= List of historical societies in California =

The following is a list of historical societies in the state of California, United States.

== Organizations ==
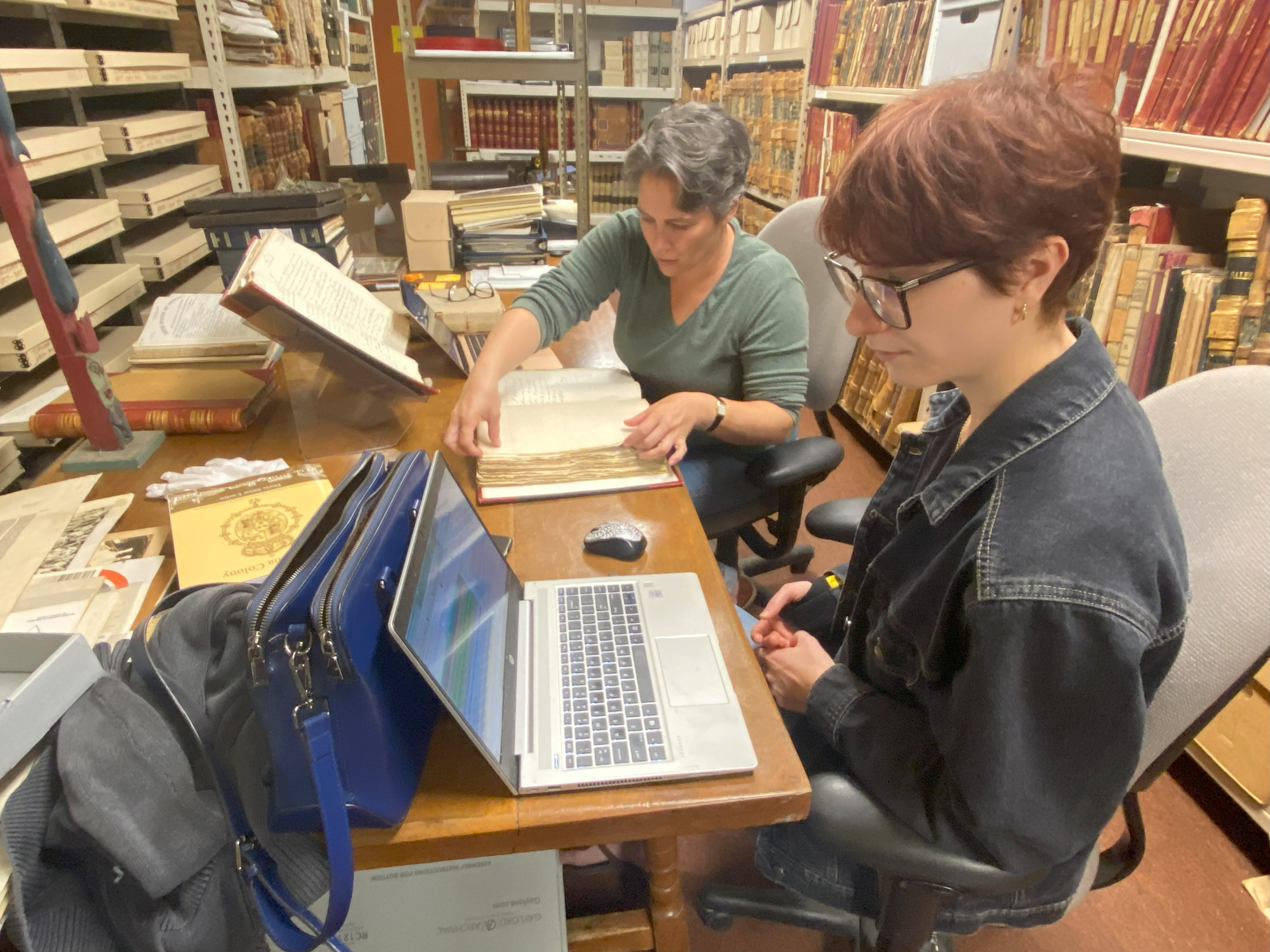
Archives of the Monterey County Historical Society, California, 2025

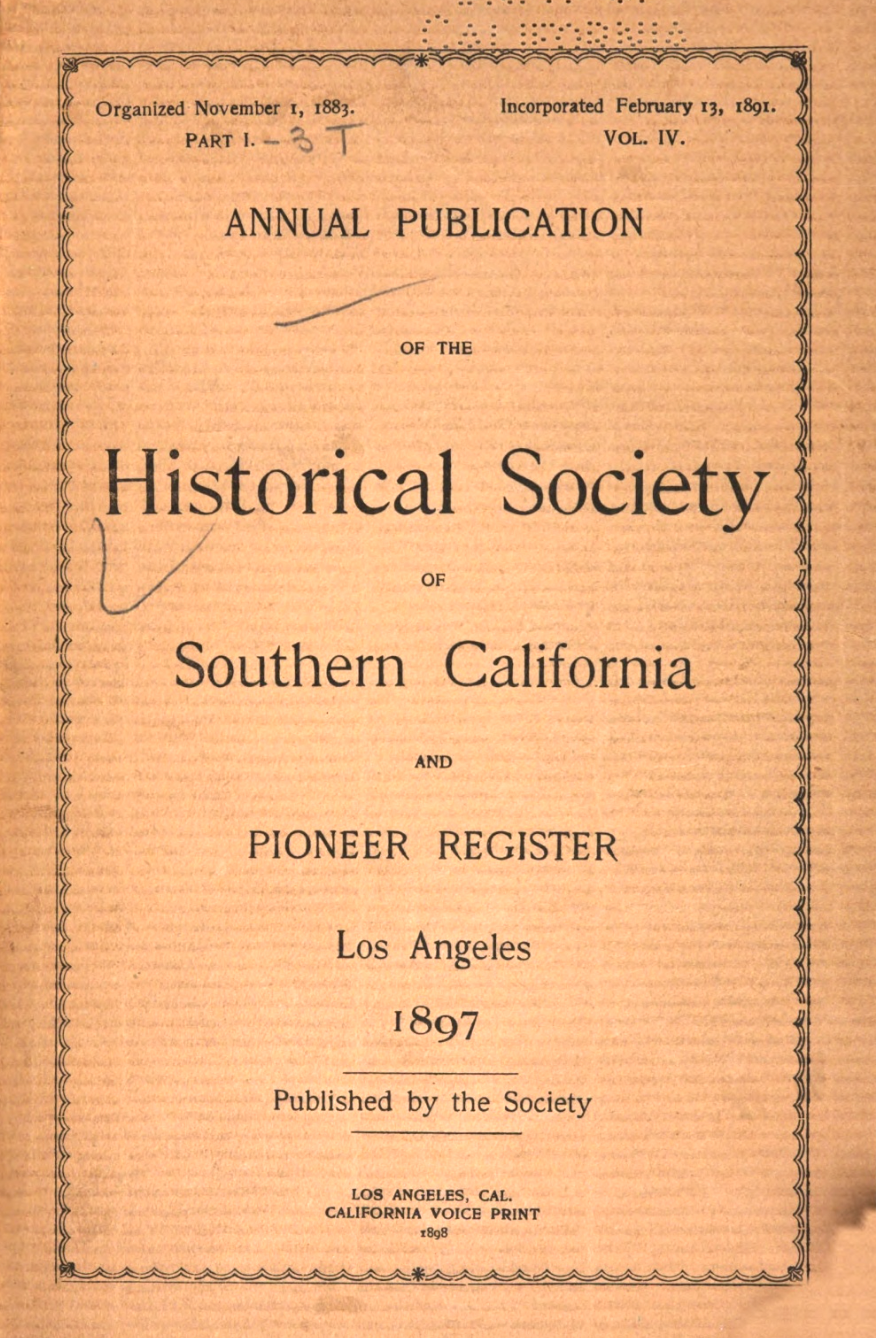
Cover of the 1897 Annual Publication of the Historical Society of Southern California

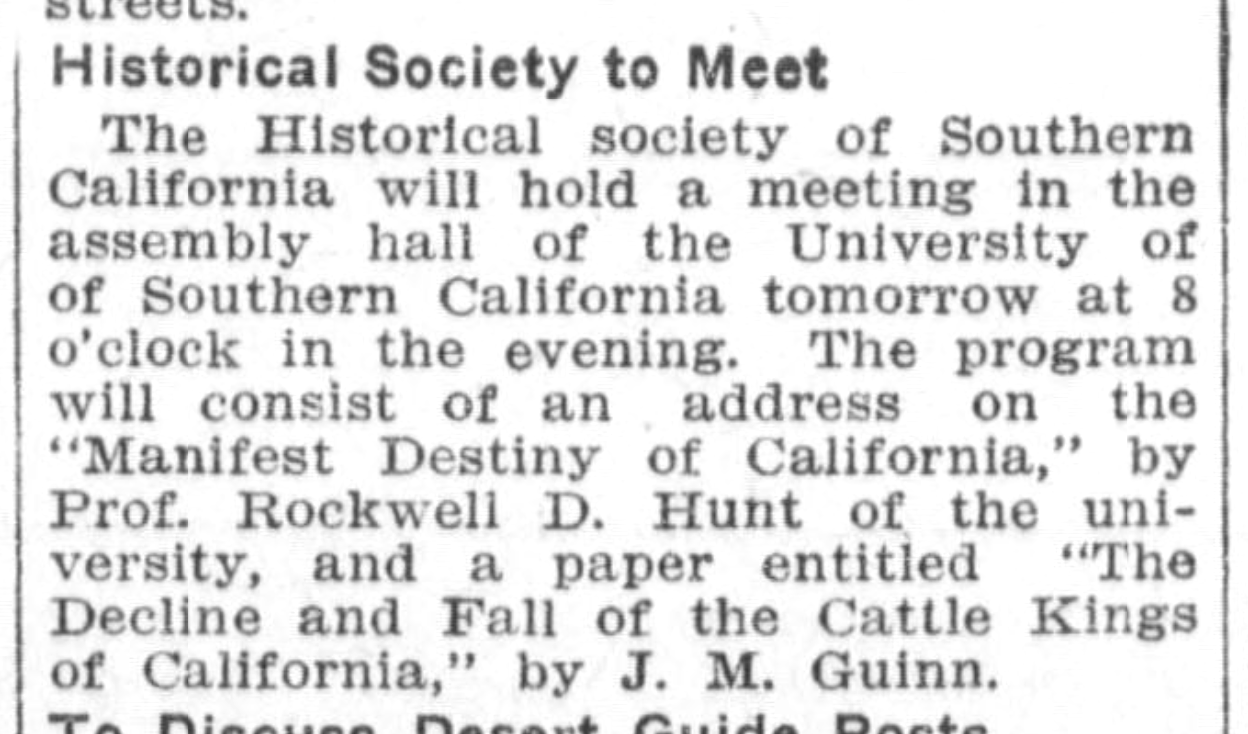
1909 newspaper item about a meeting of the Historical Society of Southern California

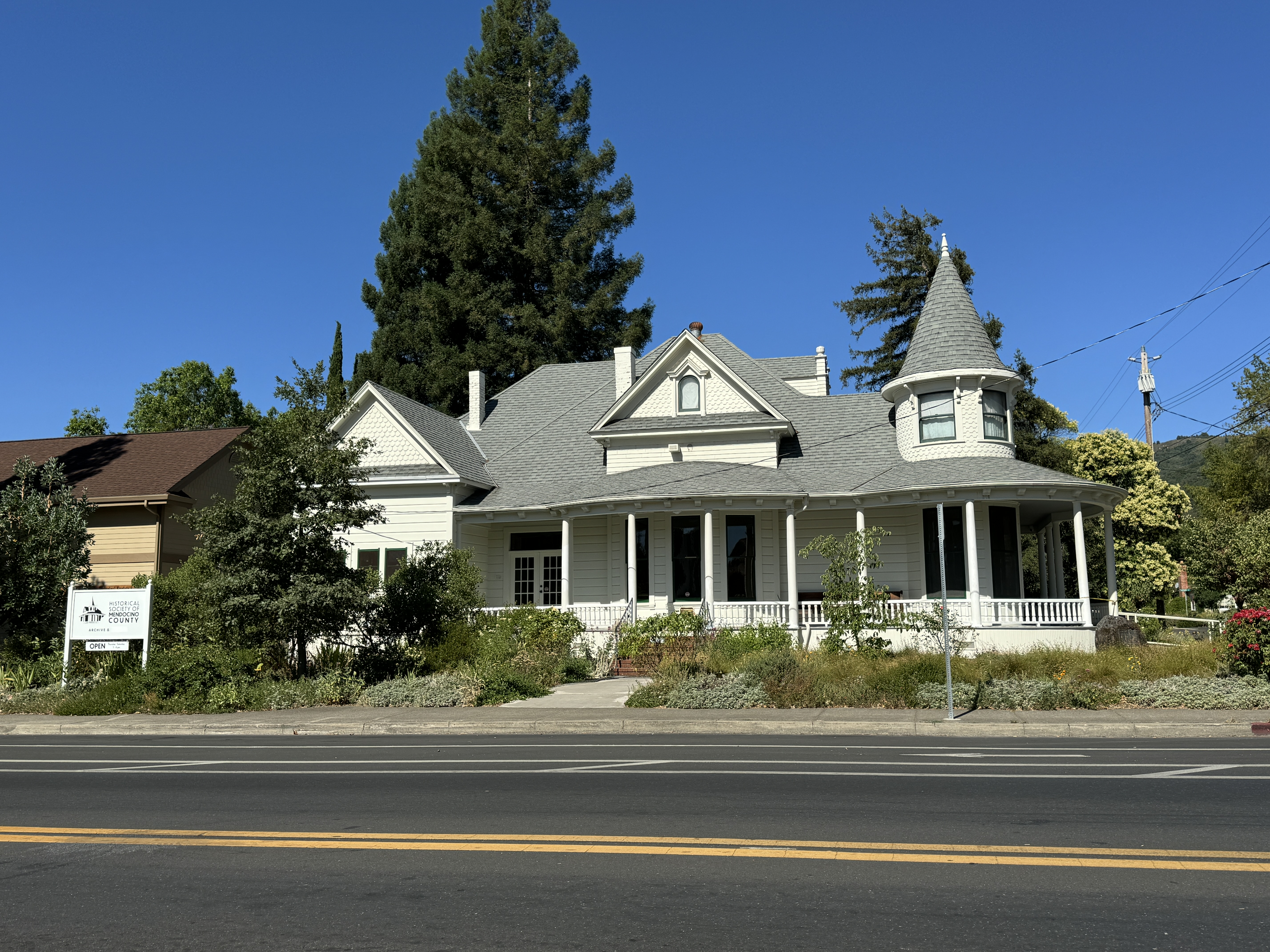
Mendocino County Historical Society building in Ukiah, California (photo 2024)

- Alameda County Historical Society
- Alhambra Historical Society
- Alpine Historical Society
- Arcadia Historical Society
- Beverly Hills Historical Society
- Burbank Historical Society
- Calaveras County Historical Society
- California Historical Society
- California Pioneers of Santa Clara County
- Camp Pendleton Historical Society
- Carlsbad Historical Society
- Carmel Valley Historical Society
- Contra Costa County Historical Society
- Del Mar Historical Society
- Duarte Historical Society and Museum
- El Cajon Historical Society
- Encitas Historical Society
- Fallbrook Historical Society
- Fort Bragg-Mendocino Coast Historical Society
- Fresno Historical Society
- Glendale Historical Society
- Glendora Historical Society
- Humboldt County Historical Society
- Imperial County Historical Society
- Japanese American Historical Society of San Diego
- Jewish Historical Society of San Diego
- Kern County Historical Society
- Kings County Historical Society
- La Jolla Historical Society
- La Mesa Historical Society
- Lakeside Historical Society
- Lemon Grove Historical Society
- Historical Society of Long Beach
- Los Angeles Conservancy, the largest membership-based historic preservation organization in the country.
- Los Angeles Historical Society
- Los Californios
- Manteca Historical Society
- Marin County Historical Society
- Mendocino County Historical Society
- Monterey County Historical Society
- Mountain Empire Historical Society in Campo
- Nevada County Historical Society
- Northwest Pacific Railroad Historical Society
- Ocean Beach Historical Society
- Orange County Historical Society
- Pacific Beach Historical Society
- Pacifica Historical Society
- Pasadena Historical Society
- Historical Society of Pomona Valley
- Poway Historical and Memorial Society
- Ramona Pioneer Historical Society
- Rancho Bernardo Historical Society in Norte
- Rancho Santa Fe Historical Society
- Russian River Historical Society
- Sacramento County Historical Society
- San Bernardino County Historical Society
- San Diego Historical Society
- San Dimas Historical Society
- San Francisco History Association
- San Lorenzo Valley Historical Society
- San Marcos Historical Society
- San Mateo County Historical Society
- Santa Barbara Historical Society
- Santa Cruz County Historical Society
- Sausalito Historical Society
- Historical Society of Santa Rosa
- Shasta Historical Society
- Sierra Madre Historical Society
- Siskiyou County Historical Society
- Sonoma County Historical Society
- Society of California Pioneers
- South Bay Historical Society in Chula Vista
- Historical Society of Southern California. Founded in 1883, the Historical Society of Southern California (HSSC) is the oldest historical society in California.
- Temecula Valley Historical Society
- Trinity County Historical Society
- Tuolumne County Historical Society
- University Heights Historical Society in San Diego
- Western Sonoma County Historical Society

== See also ==
- History of California
- List of museums in California
- National Register of Historic Places listings in California
- List of historical societies in the United States
