= Sholto Douglas (disambiguation) =

Sholto Douglas was the mythical progenitor of the Scottish Clan Douglas.

Sholto Douglas may also refer to:

- Sholto Douglas, 15th Earl of Morton (1732–1774), Scottish nobleman and peer
- Sholto Douglas, 19th Earl of Morton (1844–1935), Scottish landowner, businessman and representative peer
- Sholto Johnstone Douglas (1871–1958), Scottish artist
- Sholto Douglas (cricketer) (1873–1916), English cricketer
- Sholto Douglas, 1st Baron Douglas of Kirtleside (1893–1969), Marshal of the Royal Air Force
