= Orange County Historical Society (Orange County, California) =

Non-profit organization dedicated to the history of Orange County, California

Orange County Historical Society is a 501(c)(3) nonprofit organization dedicated to the history of Orange County, California. It was incorporated on May 28, 1919. Dormant during World War II, the Society was re-established in 1961.

== Publications ==
The Society published Orange County Medical History (1927), the Centennial Bibliography of Orange County (1989), Don Meadows’ The House of Bernardo Yorba (1963), Wayne Gibson’s The Olive Mill (1975), and Virginia Carpenter’s Cañada de la Brea: Ghost Rancho (1978).

In 1973, the Society launched the journal Orange Countiana. It is currently published annually, in the fall. This publication is open for submission of articles of up to 5,000 words about any aspect of the history of Orange County.

== Archives ==
OCHS has amassed an archive collection of historic material available for scholarly research. The OCHS also has a 1200-volume reference library.

The OCHS photograph collection includes approximately 6000 photos, some of which have been uploaded to Flickr.

OCHS archives a growing collection of articles and resources for Orange County history, including early publications of the Society, previously published articles from a variety of sources and reproductions of early promotional brochures and other historic publications.

== Membership ==
OCHS is open to public membership, which supports their programming, events, archives and publications. Members receive the monthly County Courier newsletter with information about scheduled upcoming events, local history articles, and annual Orange Countiana journal.

== See also ==
- List of historical societies in California
