= Sholto Douglas =

Mythical Scottish figure

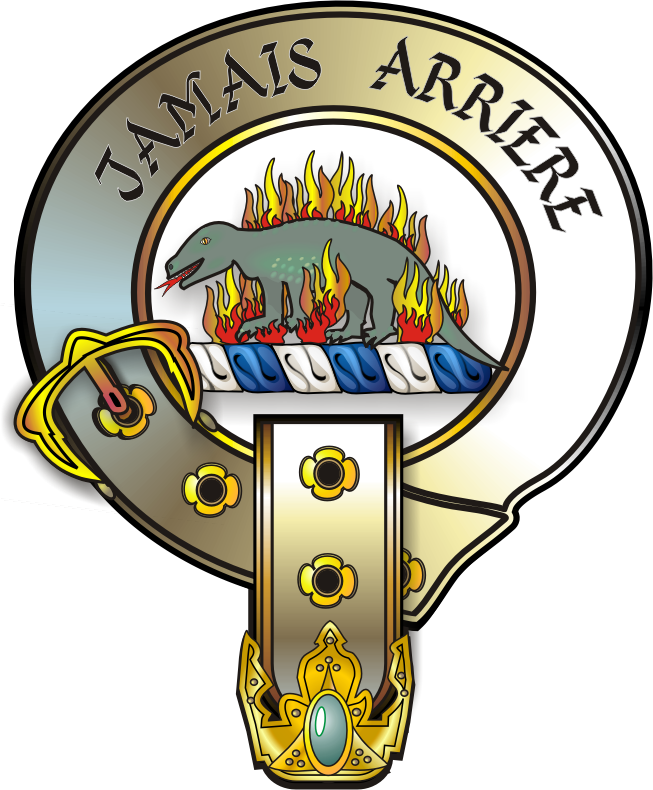
The Clan Douglas crest

Sholto Douglas was the mythical progenitor of Clan Douglas, a powerful and warlike family in medieval Scotland.

A mythical battle took place: "in 767, between King Solvathius rightful king of Scotland and a pretender Donald Bane. The victory was so nearly Donald's when a certain noble man, disdaining to see so bad a cause have good successe, struck in for the king and turned the fortunes of the day. When the king inquired about the knight who had done such valuable service, somebody exclaimed 'Sholto du glasse!'...'Behold the black man!'."

In the story of Sholto Douglas, his youngest son Marius Douglas is a commander of forces sent by the mythical Scottish king Achaius, to the court of Charlemagne to aid him in his wars against Desiderius, King of the Lombards. Marius Douglas is said to have settled in Piacenza where his descendants the Marescotti family became powerful local magnates, and eventual leaders of the Guelph faction of that city.

== See also ==
- Clan Douglas

== Sources ==
- Godscroft, David Hume of. Ane Historie of the House and Race of Douglas and Angus. London 1820.
- Maxwell, Sir Herbert. A History of the House of Douglas Vol.I. Freemantle & co., London, 1902
- Sansovino, Francesco. Della origine e de'fatti delle famiglie illustri d'Italia. Venice 1609.
