= George Gibbs (ethnologist) =

American linguist (1815–1873)

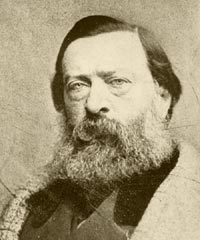
- George Gibbs
- Born: July 17, 1815; Ravenswood, New York, U.S.
- Died: April 9, 1873 (aged 57); New Haven, Connecticut, U.S.
- Education: Harvard University
- Scientific career
- Fields: Ethnology; Geology
- Workplaces: New-York Historical Society Smithsonian Institution

George Gibbs (1815–1873) was an American ethnologist, naturalist and geologist who contributed to the study of the languages of indigenous peoples in Washington Territory. Known for his expertise in Native American customs and languages, Gibbs participated in numerous treaty negotiations between the U.S. government and the native tribes.

== Early life ==
Gibbs was born 1815 in Ravenswood (now part of Astoria, Queens, New York City) to mineralogist George Gibbs and Laura Wolcott Gibbs, daughter of Oliver Wolcott Jr. His younger brothers were Oliver Wolcott Gibbs and Alfred Gibbs. He attended the Round Hill School until the age of seventeen, when, after not gaining an appointment to West Point he took an extended tour of Europe.

== Early professional life ==
Gibbs graduated Harvard in 1838 with a law degree and returned to New York City to practice law with (Jonathan) Prescott Hall. In 1840, he was instrumental in reviving the New-York Historical Society where he worked as the librarian from 1842 through 1848. He was a supporter of the Whig Party, which led to a later appointment by President Millard Fillmore.

== Early western travels – Oregon and California ==
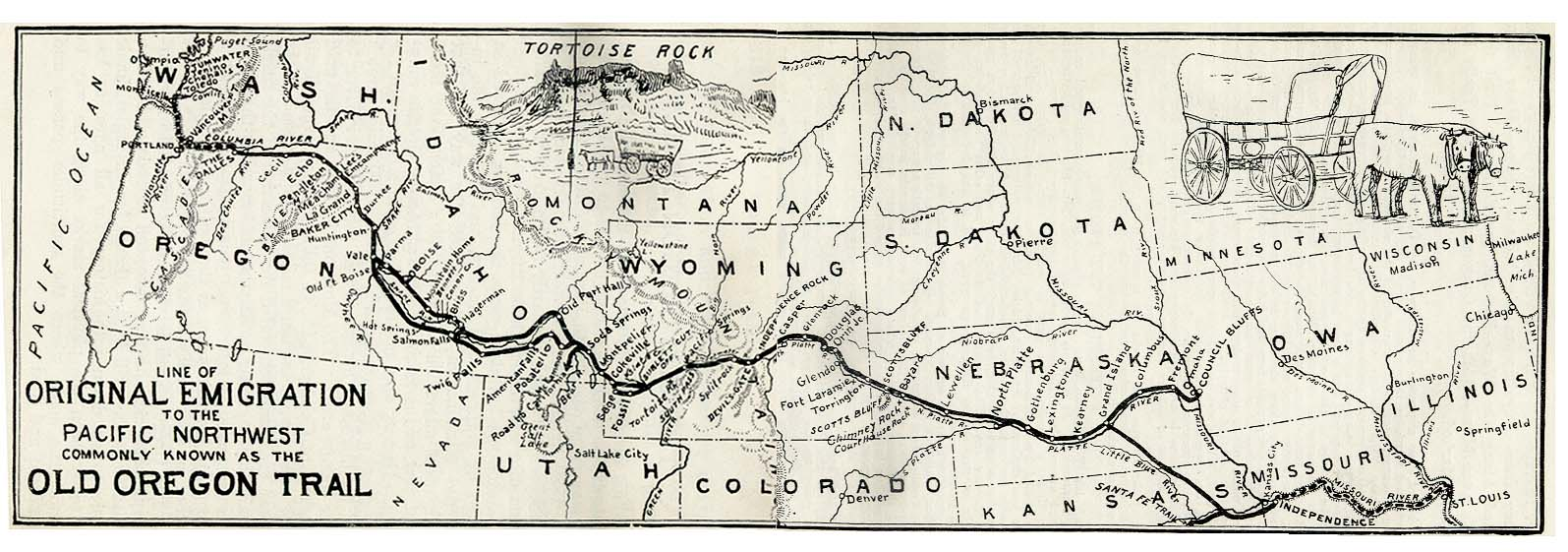
Map of the Oregon Trail

In the spring of 1849, weary of practicing law, Gibbs was drawn to the West by the California Gold Rush. His brother Alfred being attached to the Regiment of Mounted Riflemen, he traveled to Fort Leavenworth, arriving on May 8, 1849, and attached himself to the Regiment which was then under the command of Colonel William W. Loring, its previous commander, Brigadier General Persifor F. Smith, having been given command of the Pacific Division of the Army. (Note: Alfred was not currently with the regiment; after having been wounded in the Mexican–American War he was assigned as aide-de-camp to Smith until 1856 and presumably was in California at the time George Gibbs was with the Regiment.) The Regiment had been dispatched to the Oregon Territory, and both Gibbs and Major Osbourne Cross documented its overland travel along the Oregon Trail to Fort Vancouver to which they arrived on October 4 of that year. In addition to a diary, Gibbs recorded the journey on a copy of John Charles Frémont's map Map of an Exploring Expedition to the Rocky Mountains in the Year 1842, Oregon and North California in the Years 1843–44. (Note: At some point later, Gibbs erased his notations on Fremont's map of the Regiment's march and instead used it to annotate a map of the explorations of Jedediah Smith. Carl I. Wheat speculated that it was at Fort Vancouver that Gibbs found the original "Smith map" at which point he copied it onto his Frémont map.)

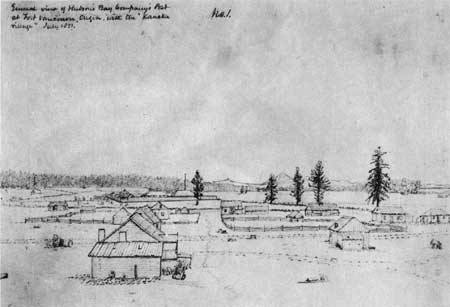
—Fort Vancouver and the Village from the Northwest, July, 1851, Drawn by George Gibbs. From collection of photographs entitled Drawings by George Gibbs in the Far Northwest, 1849–1851, in the American Bureau of Ethnology. Smithsonian Institution.

Gibbs may also have met Peter Skene Ogden during his first days in Fort Vancouver and Oregon City; later correspondence indicates he was well acquainted with Ogden. He found work as the deputy collector of Customs at the Port of Astoria, Oregon Territory in Astoria, Oregon, and dabbled with practicing law again. In the spring of 1851, he joined the Oregon Indian Commission (composed of John P. Gaines, Alonzo A. Skinner and Beverly S. Allen) on a treaty excursion, (Note: By the time the Commission was underway in the spring of 1851, Congress had transferred the duties of the Oregon Commission to the Superintendent of Indian Affairs. They had entered into six treaties before they received this information.) traveling through the Willamette Valley negotiating with the tribes, passing through Oregon City and again ending up in Fort Vancouver in July, 1851.

Shortly thereafter, Redick McKee hired Gibbs to accompany him on his portion of the California treaty excursion in the Humboldt Bay/Klamath River region, at which time Gibbs presumably sailed to San Francisco to meet McKee, embarking on the excursion in the early part of August, 1851. At the end of the excursion late in October 1851, Gibbs traveled with McKee back to San Francisco, arriving on December 28, 1851. (Note: In Gibbs' journal transcript published by Schoolcraft, he glossed over the events of the trip back to San Francisco, but they are mentioned on page 1804 of the Report of the Chief of Engineers U.S. Army for the year 1879. At Humboldt Bay, McKee and Gibbs had boarded the steamer Sea Gull, hoping to meet the mail steamer Columbia on its way back to San Francisco at Port Orford, Oregon. Apparently, off the coast of Port Orford, bad weather and mechanical problems forced both ships to return to Portland, Oregon, where Gibbs and McKee stayed from December 19 until the 23rd.) He stayed in Benicia, California through the early months of 1852 transcribing his journal of the expedition for McKee, and also preparing a map of the excursion. (Note: Gibbs' map is in the National Archives, Record Group No. 75, Map 47, Tube 123: "Sketch of the Northwestern Part of California, accompanying a Journal of the expedition of Redick McKee, compiled by George Gibbs in 1851") On February 23, 1852, he sent the transcript and map to McKee, who was to take them to Washington, D.C. and give them to Henry Schoolcraft, whom Gibbs knew through their mutual association in the New-York Historical Society. He corresponded with Schoolcraft to ensure that the vocabularies sent with the transcript were correctly spelled (Schoolcraft published the transcript, which referenced "the Smith map" several times, in 1853.). While waiting for the spring rains to ebb, Gibbs wrote Observations on the Indians of the Klamath River and Humboldt Bay, Accompanying Vocabularies of Their Languages archived in the Smithsonian Institution. He then traveled to back to the Klamath/Rogue River region and finally pursued his original objective in coming west; prospecting for gold. He also collected stories of travels of other explorers and settlers through the region he traveled with McKee; the notebook with those stories is also in the Smithsonian.

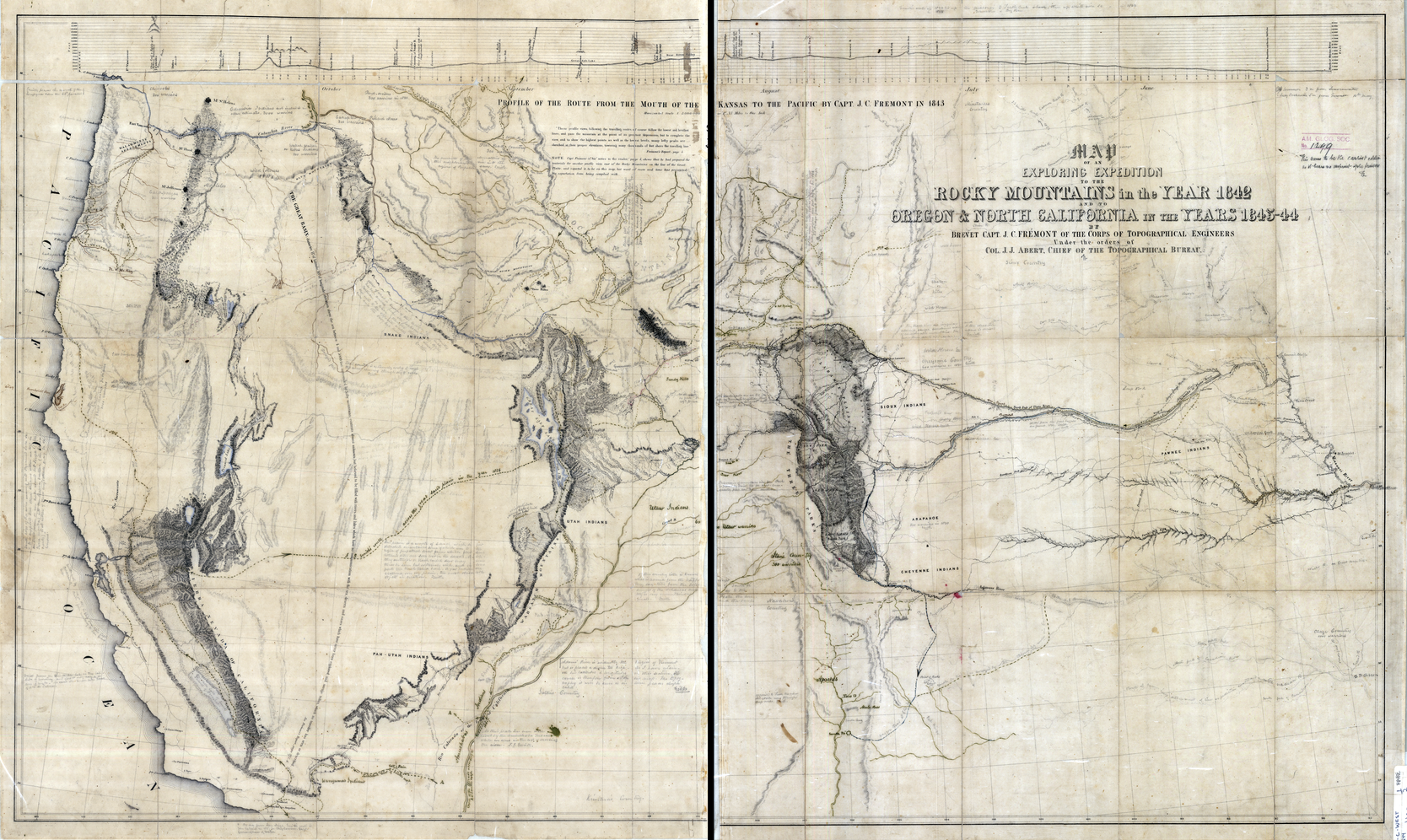
Map of Jedediah Smith's explorations that Gibbs annotated on an 1844 version of John C. Fremont's Map of an Exploring Expedition To The Rocky Mountains in the Years 1842 and to Oregon & North California in the Years 1843–44. University of Wisconsin–Milwaukee Libraries

In late 1852, Fillmore appointed Gibbs as the Collector of Customs, and he returned from the Klamath River region to Humboldt Bay and took a ship to San Francisco, then back up the coast to Astoria, Oregon where he arrived in mid-December. In April, 1853, while at Fort Vancouver, he received news that the newly inaugurated Franklin Pierce planned to reappoint the previous Customs Collector. Also, while there, he conferred with Ogden on a matter on which Schoolcraft had requested information.

== Washington Territory – the Pacific Railroad Survey, the Treaty Expeditions of 1854–1855, and the Indian Wars ==
Midway through 1853, Gibbs moved to Steilacoom, Washington, where he was hired by George McClellan to work along with James Graham Cooper as an ethnologist, geologist and naturalist in McClellan's section of the Northern Branch of the Pacific Railroad Survey, between the Puget Sound and the Spokane River. He gathered and preserved many specimens which became a part of Cooper's zoological reports of the expedition and were later supplied to the Smithsonian. McClellan's party met up with Isaac Stevens' (the expedition leader and appointed Territorial Governor) party that had left Minnesota in June to survey west. Both parties arrived in Fort Vancouver in November, 1853.

Upon his return to Steilacoom, Gibbs wrote two reports, Indian Tribes of Washington Territory and The Geology of the Central Part of Washington Territory for McClellan on his observations of the Indian Tribes of Washington Territory. He sent the report in early March 1854, and soon thereafter he was hired by Governor Stevens to assist him with negotiating treaties with the Washington Indian tribes.

He earned a reputation as the "most apt student of the Indian languages and customs in the Northwest", because his skills with Governor Stevens helped convince the natives to sign the treaty. Before the treaty was signed, there was a vigorous debate about how many reservations should be built. Gibbs brought an argument to the table that because there was much variety in the Indians' customs and languages, and in their needs for fishing rights, amongst others, many small reservations should be built.

He also was given a job of sending out a census on the Washington Territory's tribes. That resulted in a report that showed marked population decline, comparing to Hudson's Bay Company information, which was a bit older. The decrease in the population may have been due to epidemics which wiped out a large portion of the tribal population.

In early 1855, the Territorial Legislature appointed Gibbs Brigadier General of the Militia. No funds were appropriated for the position, and he never actively led a militia. He was, however, an active opponent to Governor Stevens' reaction to the skimishes.

== The Northwest Boundary Survey 1857–1862 ==
In 1857 Gibbs joined The Northwest Boundary Survey of the Canada–United States border, which began on the Pacific coast and included in its ranks Joseph Smith Harris. He served in the field until 1860, then relocated to Washington D.C. where he continued to work for the survey until mid-1862. The Smithsonian collection of Gibbs' papers from that time period includes the notes of his research on the growth of forests in the Washington Territory, dated to 1860. Three journal notebooks with notes from the Pacific Railroad Survey and the Northwest Boundary Survey are at the Beinecke Rare Book & Manuscript Library, Yale University. John Strong Newberry wrote an article about the fossil plants Gibbs collected on the survey.

== Later life ==
Gibbs returned to New York for a short time in 1862. He volunteered to defend the home of John C. Fremont during the New York City draft riots on July 15, 1863, after which he returned to Washington D.C., where he spent most of the last decade of his life. After the Civil War he served on a commission settling claims of the Hudson's Bay Company against the U.S., corresponding with George Davidson; his letters to Davidson are in the Bancroft Library. He also expanded his studies of Indian languages while working at the Smithsonian Institution. He married his cousin Mary Kane Gibbs and moved to New Haven, Connecticut in 1871, where he died in 1873. He donated his map collection, including his annotated "Smith Map" to the American Geographical Society, where it disappeared in the archives until Carl Wheat found it in 1953. In 1877, John Wesley Powell published Contributions to North American Ethnology, Vol. I which consisted of an article Tribes of the extreme Northwest by William Healey Dall and Tribes of western Washington and northwestern Oregon by Gibbs. The original manuscript of Tribes of western Washington and northwestern Oregon, dated 1865, and other papers were given to the State Historical Society of Wisconsin by Gibbs' grand-niece in 1949.

== Major references ==
- Cross, Osbourne; Gibbs, George (1989) [1940]. Raymond W. Settle (ed.). The March of the Mounted Riflemen: From Fort Leavenworth to Fort Vancouver, May to October 1849 (paperback ed.). Lincoln: University of Nebraska Press. ISBN 0803291965.
- Stevens, John Austin (1873). A Memorial of George Gibbs ...: Read Before the New-York Historical Society, Oct. 7, 1873. Society.
