= Protected areas of the United States =

Legally protected land

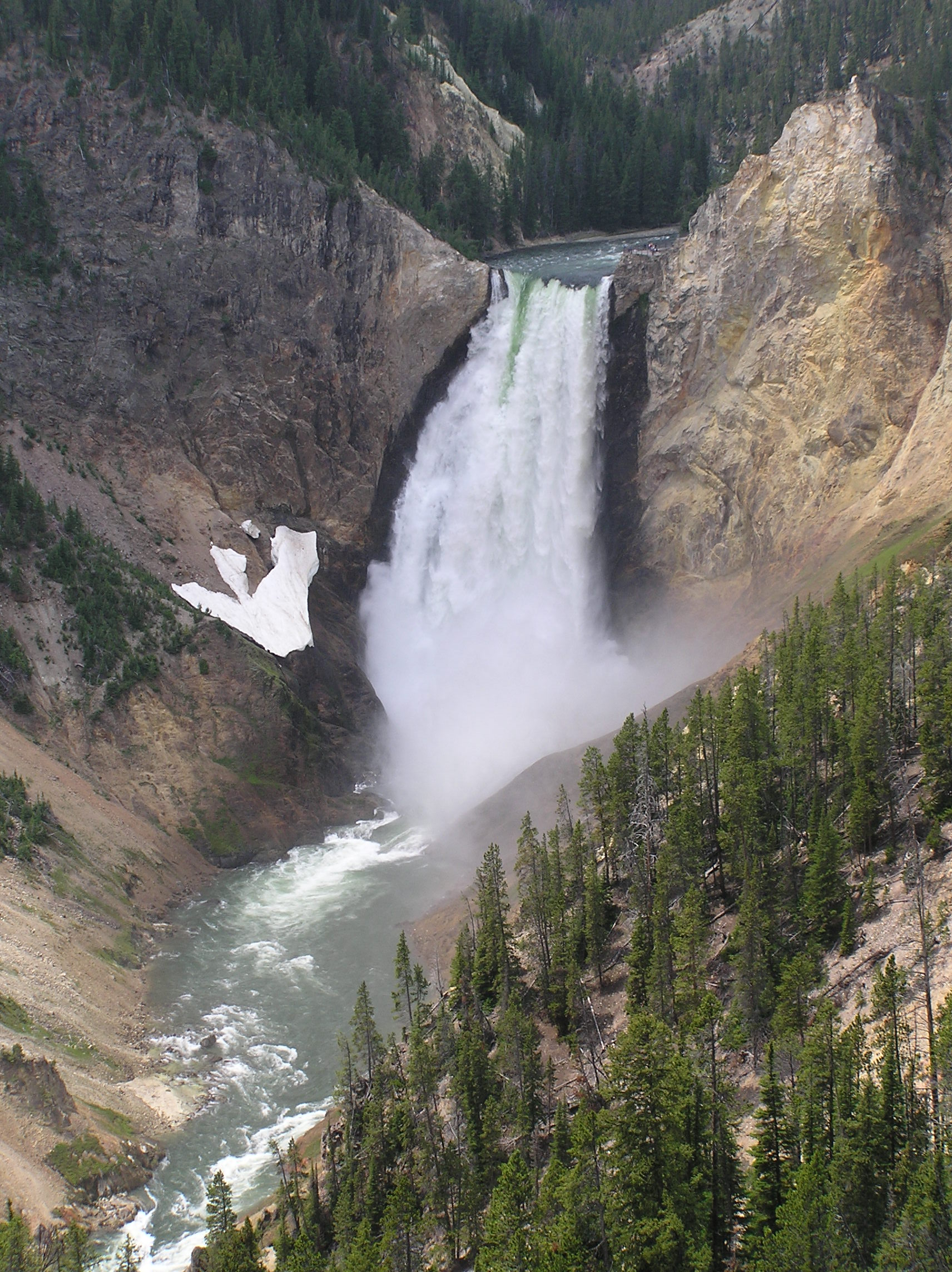
Grand Canyon of Yellowstone

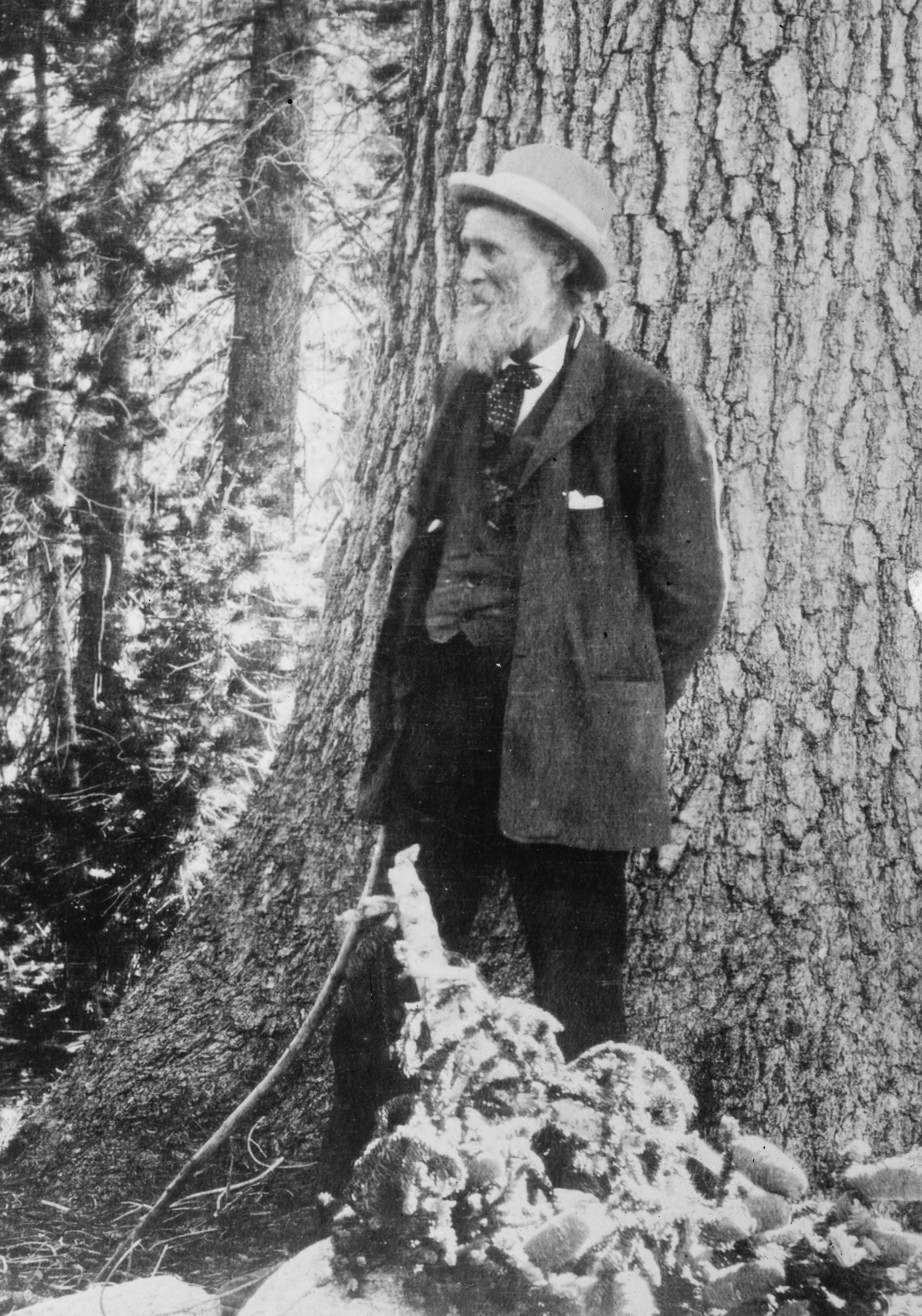
John Muir (1838–1914), one of the main inspirations for the U.S. national park system. "Why should man value himself as more than a small part of the one great unit of creation ?" - John Muir.

The protected areas of the United States are managed by an array of different federal, state, tribal and local level authorities and receive widely varying levels of protection. Some areas are managed as wilderness, while others are operated with acceptable commercial exploitation. As of 2022, the 42,826 protected areas covered 1,235,486 km^{2} (477,024 sq mi), or 13 percent of the land area of the United States. This is also one-tenth of the protected land area of the world. The U.S. also had a total of 871 National Marine Protected Areas, covering an additional 1,240,000 mi^{2} (3,200,000 km^{2}), or 26 percent of the total marine area of the United States.

== Federal-level protected areas ==
Federal protected areas include lands and waters owned outright ("Fee ownerships"), as well as areas that are secured by easements, leases, etc. In addition to ownership-defined areas, there are numerous overlaying policy designations that apply management protections and use conditions on all or some of individual protected areas (e.g., Wilderness Areas, National Monuments, etc.).

As of 2007, according to the United Nations Environment Programme, the U.S. had a total of 6,770 terrestrial nationally designated (federal) protected areas. Federal level protected areas are managed by a variety of agencies, most of which are a part of the National Park Service, a bureau of the United States Department of the Interior. They are often considered the crown jewels of the protected areas. Other areas are managed by the United States Forest Service, the Bureau of Land Management and the United States Fish and Wildlife Service. The United States Army Corps of Engineers is claimed to provide 30 percent of the recreational opportunities on federal lands, mainly through lakes and waterways that they manage.

The highest levels of protection, as described by the International Union for Conservation of Nature (IUCN), are Level I (Strict Nature Reserves & Wilderness Areas) and Level II (National Parks). The United States maintains 12 percent of the Level I and II lands in the world. These lands had a total area of 210,000 sq mi (540,000 km^{2}).

Because U.S. federal protected areas include both ownership based names, and names related to overlaying policy designations, the naming system for U.S. protected areas results in some types being used by more than one agency. For instance, both the National Park Service and the U.S. Forest Service manage areas designated National Preserves and National Recreation Areas. The National Park Service, the U.S. Forest Service, and the Bureau of Land Management manage areas called national monuments. National Wilderness Areas are designated within other protected areas, managed by various agencies and sometimes wilderness areas span areas managed by multiple agencies. Those relying on U.S. protected areas data are advised to learn more about all of these conventions by reviewing the extensive PAD-US Help system.

There are existing federal designations of historic or landmark status that may support preservation via tax incentives, but that do not necessarily convey any protection, including a listing on the National Register of Historic Places or a designation as a National Historic Landmark. States and local zoning bodies may or may not choose to protect these. The state of Colorado, for example, is very clear that it does not set any limits on owners of NRHP properties.

Federal protected area designations

- National Park System (list of areas here)
  - National Parks
  - National Preserves
  - National Seashores
  - National Lakeshores
- National Forest
  - National Forests
  - National Grasslands
- National Conservation Lands
  - National Monuments (list here)
  - National Conservation Areas
  - Wilderness Areas (list here)
  - Wilderness Study Areas
  - National Wild and Scenic Rivers (list here)
  - National Scenic Trails
  - National Historic Trails
  - Cooperative Management and Protection Areas
  - Forest Reserves
  - Outstanding Natural Areas
  - National Scenic Areas
- National Marine Sanctuaries
- National Recreation Areas
- National Estuarine Research Reserves
- National Trails System
- National Wildlife Refuge System (list here)
- Tennessee Valley Authority
  - Day-Use Recreation Areas
  - Natural Areas

International protected area designations

- UNESCO Biosphere Reserves in the United States

== State-level protected areas ==
Every state has a system of state parks as well as many other types of protected areas (forests, reserves, refuges, recreation areas, etc.). State parks vary widely from urban parks to very large parks that are on a par with national parks. Some state parks, like Adirondack Park, are similar to the national parks of England and Wales, with numerous towns inside the borders of the park. About half the area of the park, some 3,000,000 acres (1,200,000 ha), is state-owned and preserved as "forever wild" by the Forest Preserve of New York. Wood-Tikchik State Park in Alaska is the largest state park by the amount of contiguous protected land; it is larger than many U.S. National Parks, with some 1,600,000 acres (650,000 ha), making it larger than the state of Delaware. Many states also operate game and recreation areas.

- Lists of state parks in the United States: Alabama, Alaska, Arizona, Arkansas, California, Colorado, Connecticut, Delaware, Florida, Georgia, Hawaii, Idaho, Illinois, Indiana, Iowa, Kansas, Kentucky, Louisiana, Maine, Maryland, Massachusetts, Michigan, Minnesota, Mississippi, Missouri, Montana, North Carolina, North Dakota, Nebraska, Nevada, New Hampshire, New Jersey, New Mexico, New York, Ohio, Oklahoma, Oregon, Pennsylvania, Puerto Rico, Rhode Island, South Carolina, South Dakota, Tennessee, Texas, Utah, Vermont, Virginia, Washington, West Virginia, Wisconsin and Wyoming
- List of U.S. state and tribal wilderness areas
- List of Wildlife Management Areas in the U.S.

== Local-level protected areas ==
U.S. counties, cities and towns, metropolitan authorities, regional park systems, recreation districts and other units manage a wide variety of local public parks and other protected areas. Some of these are little more than picnic areas or playgrounds; however, others are extensive nature reserves. South Mountain Park in Phoenix, Arizona, for example, is called the largest city park in the United States; it spans 25 sq mi (65 km^{2}) and contains 58 mi (93 km) of trails.

== List of protected areas by region ==
- Protected areas of Alabama
- Protected areas of Alaska
- Protected areas of American Samoa
- Protected areas of Arkansas
- Protected areas of California
- Protected areas of Colorado
- Protected areas of Delaware
- List of protected areas of Florida
- Protected areas of Georgia
- Protected areas of Idaho
- Protected areas of Illinois
- Protected areas of Indiana
- Protected areas of Kentucky
- Protected areas of Louisiana
- Protected areas of Maryland
- Protected areas of Michigan
- Protected areas of Mississippi
- Protected areas of New Jersey
- Protected areas of North Carolina
- Protected areas of Ohio
- Protected areas of Oklahoma
- Protected areas of Puerto Rico
- Protected areas of South Carolina
- Protected areas of Tennessee
- Protected areas of Texas
- Protected areas of West Virginia

== See also ==
- Environmental movement in the United States
