= King Peak (California) =

Mountain in California, United States

- Location within California

Highest point
- Elevation: 4,091 ft (1,247 m)
- Prominence: 2,928 ft (892 m)
- Coordinates: 40°09′25″N 124°07′27″W

Geography
- Location: Humboldt County, California, U.S.
- Parent range: King Range
- Topo map: USGS Honeydew

King Peak is a summit in Humboldt County, California, in the United States. It is the tallest mountain of the Lost Coast.

King Peak was named for a captain of the United States Army.

Going back to 1886 maps, this mountain was referred to as "King's Peak". Circa 1949 it was listed on one map as "King Peak" but later maps show "King's Peak".
