= List of Tennessee Wildlife Management Areas =

Tennessee Wildlife Management Areas are protected areas in the US state of Tennessee managed by the Tennessee Wildlife Resources Commission. The law enforcement body of the areas is the Tennessee Wildlife Resources Agency.

== List of Wildlife management areas ==
The state is divided into four regions

=== West Tennessee Region 1 ===
WMAs in Region1:

- Barkley WMA Units 1 & 2: 8,090 acres (3,270 ha).
- Bean Switch Refuge
- Beason Creek PHA
- Beech River WMA
- Big Sandy WMA
- Black Bayou Refuge
- Bogota WMA
- Buffalo Ridge Refuge
- Camden WMA
- Chickasaw State Forest & WMA
- C. M. Gooch WMA
- Colonel Forrest V. Durand WMA
- Cypress Pond Refuge
- Eagle Lake Refuge
- Ernest Rice WMA
- Fort Ridge WMA
- Grays Creek WMA
- Harmon Creek WMA
- Harts Mill WMA
- Hop-in Refuge
- Horns Bluff Refuge
- Jarrell Switch Refuge
- John Tully WMA
- Land Between the Lakes WMA
- Lick Creek WMA
- Maness Swamp Refuge
- Meeman-Shelby WMA
- Moss Island WMA
- Natchez Trace WMA
- New Hope WMA
- Obion River WMA
- Parker Branch WMA
- Perry Switch WMA
- Presidents Island WMA
- Reelfoot WMA
- Sergeant Lee Russell Refuge
- South Fork Waterfowl Refuge
- Spring Creek Wetland PHA
- Thorny Cypress WMA
- Three Rivers WMA
- Tigrett WMA
- Tull Bottoms WMA
- Tumbleweed WMA
- West Sandy WMA
- White Lake Refuge
- White Oak WMA
- Wolf River WMA & Ghost River SNA

=== Middle Tennessee Region 2 ===
WMAs in Region 2:

- AEDC And Woods Reservoir Refuge
- Bark Camp Barrens WMA
- Bear Hollow Mountain WMA
- Beaverdam Creek WMA
- Browntown WMA
- Cedar Hill Swamp WMA
- Cheatham WMA
- Cheatham Lake WMA
- Eagle Creek WMA
- Flintville Hatchery
- Haley-Jaqueth WMA
- Happy Hollow WMA
- Haynes Bottom WMA
- Headwaters WMA
- Hick Hill WMA
- Hickory Flats WMA
- Laurel Hill WMA
- Maple Springs WMA
- Mingo Swamp WMA
- MTSU WMA
- Normand WMA
- Old Hickory WMA
- Old Hickory Lock 5 Refuge
- Owl Hollow Mill WMA
- Percy Priest WMA
- Shelton Ferry WMA
- Tie Camp WMA
- Williamsport WMA
- Yanahli WMA

=== Cumberland Plateau Region 3 ===
WMAs in Region 3:

- Alpine Mountain WMA
- Blackburn Fork WMA
- Bridgestone/Firestone Centennial Wilderness WMA
- Catoosa WMA
- Catoosa Ridge Refuge
- Charlotte Ann Finnel Neal WMA
- South Cherokee WMA
- Chickamauga WMA
- Cordell Hull WMA
- Cordell Hull Waterfowl Refuge
- Edgar Evins State Park
- Fall Creek Falls State Park
- Fourth Fractional Township WMA
- Harp WMA
- Hiwassee Refuge
- Jackson Swamp WMA
- Keyes-Harrison WMA
- Kingston Refuge
- Luper Mountain WMA
- McGlothin-Largen WMA
- Mt. Roosevelt WMA
- North Chickamauga Creek WMA
- Oak Ridge WMA
- Paint Rock WMA
- Pea Ridge WMA
- Pickett State Forest
- Prentice Cooper WMA
- Skinner Mountain WMA
- Standing Stone State Park
- Tellico Lake WMA
- The Boils WMA
- Watts Bar WMA
- Yuchi Refuge

=== East Tennessee - Region 4, Wildlife Management Areas ===
WMAs in Region 4:

- Buffalo Springs WMA
- North Cherokee WMA
- Chuck Swan WMA
- Cove Creek WMA
- Foothills WMA
- Forks of the River WMA
- Fort Loudoun WMA
- Henderson Island Refuge
- Henderson Swamp PHA
- Kyker Bottoms Refuge WMA
- Kyles Ford WMA
- Lick Creek Bottoms WMA
- Nolichucky WMA
- North Cumberland WMA
- Rankin WMA
- Whites Mill Refuge

== See also ==
List of Tennessee state parks and natural areas
