= Kern National Wildlife Refuge =

Protected area

- IUCN category IV (habitat/species management area)
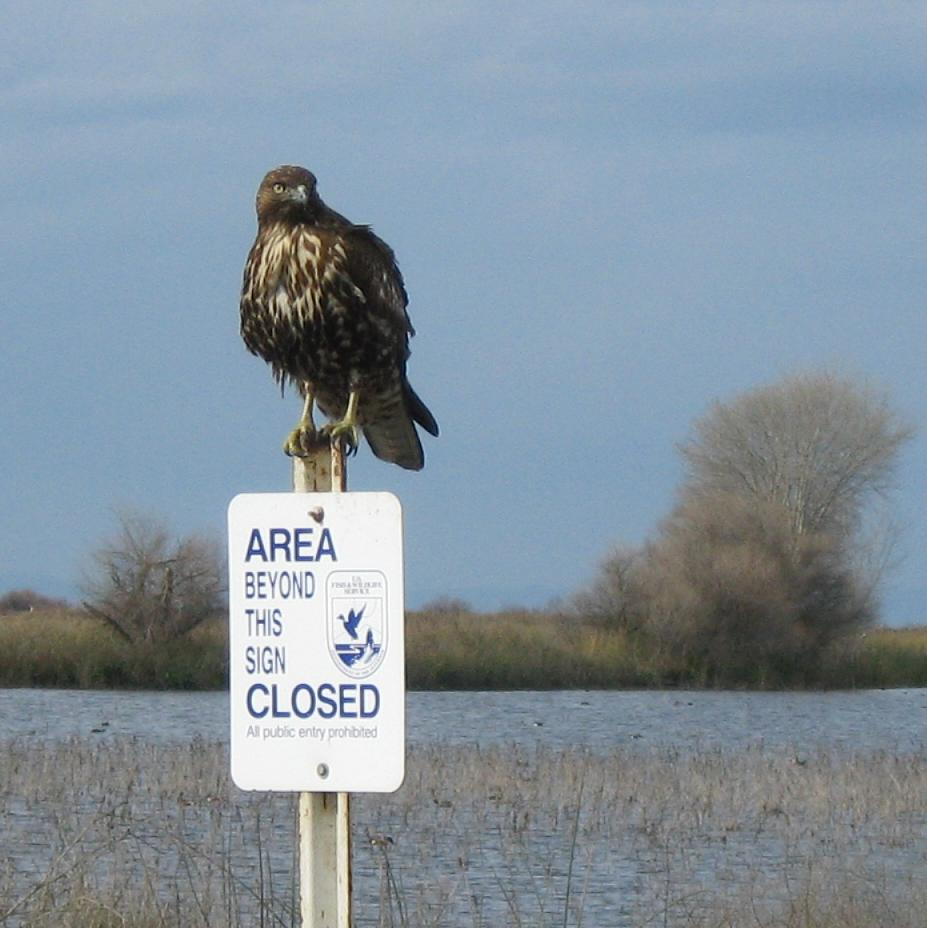

- Location within the United States
- Location: Kern County, California, United States
- Nearest city: Wasco, California
- Coordinates: 35.74579°N 119.6179°W
- Area: 1,249 acres (5.05 km^{2})
- Established: 1960
- Governing body: U.S. Fish and Wildlife Service
- Website: Kern NWR

Kern National Wildlife Refuge is a 11,249-acre (45.52 km^{2}) protected area located in the southern portion of California's San Joaquin Valley, 20 miles (32 km) west of the city of Delano. Situated on the southern margin of what was once the largest freshwater wetland complex known as Tulare Lake in the western United States, Kern National Wildlife Refuge provides an optimum wintering habitat for migratory birds with an emphasis on waterfowl and water birds. The wetlands provide habitat for birds as part of the Pacific Flyway.

Through restoration and maintenance of native habitat diversity, the refuge also provides suitable habitat for several endangered species as well as preserving a remnant example of the historic valley uplands in the San Joaquin Desert. Approximately 8,200 visitors annually participate in refuge programs ranging from waterfowl hunting to wildlife viewing.
