= Modoc National Wildlife Refuge =

National Wildlife Refuge in the United States

- IUCN category IV (habitat/species management area)
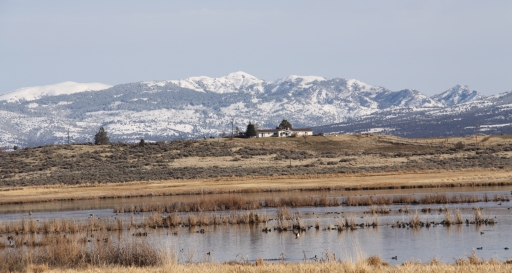

- Location within the United States
- Location: Modoc County, California, United States
- Nearest city: Alturas, California
- Coordinates: 41°27′25″N 120°31′07″W
- Area: 7,000 acres (28 km^{2})
- Established: 1961
- Governing body: U.S. Fish and Wildlife Service
- Website: Modoc National Wildlife Refuge

Modoc National Wildlife Refuge is a National Wildlife Refuge of the United States located in northeastern California. It is next to the South Fork of the Pit River in Modoc County, southeast of Alturas.

The area was first claimed by the Dorris Family in 1870 under the first of the federal Homestead Acts. The family developed a livestock ranch and built a reservoir. The first 5,360 acres were purchased from the family in 1960 to establish the refuge. Over the years more territory was purchased from several landowners, and today the refuge covers over 7,000 acres.

The refuge is located about 60 miles outside the Klamath Basin. It is on the western edge of the Great Basin and includes many types of habitat, such as seasonal and semi-permanent wetlands, wet meadows, riparian zones, sagebrush steppe, reservoir, and cropland. It is a staging area and wetland breeding habitat for migratory birds of the Pacific Flyway, such as waterfowl and the sandhill crane. More than 250 species of birds have been recorded on the refuge.

The functions of the refuge include preservation and conservation of habitat and flora and fauna, and recreation and public services such as hunting, fishing, boating, hiking, wildlife observation and photography, and education.

Management activities in the local habitat include grazing and crop cultivation, prescribed burning, and water manipulation. The wetlands are stewarded to provide healthy vegetation for the use of resident and visiting birds.
