= King Range (California) =

Coastal mountain range in California

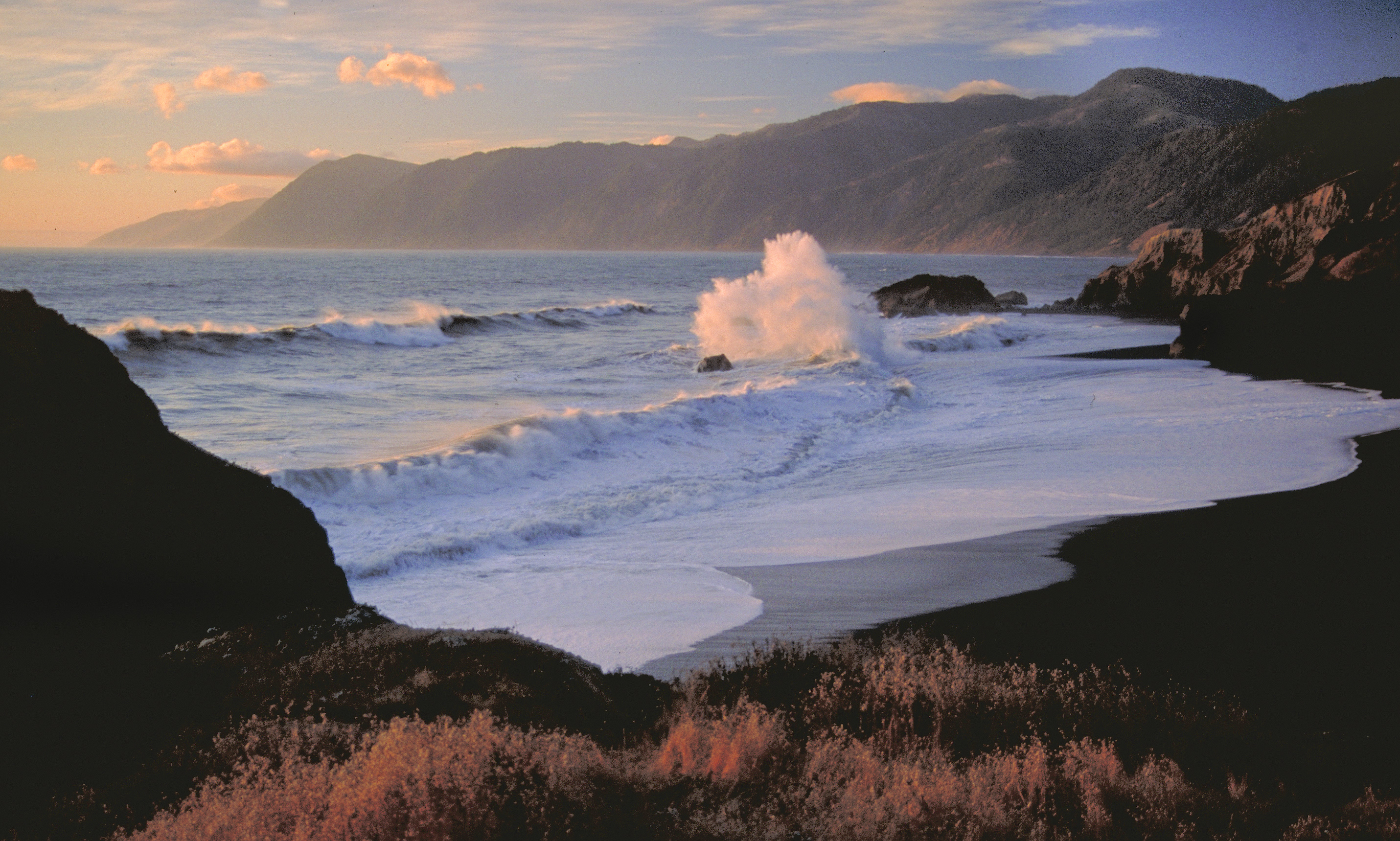
- Beach & surf, King Range National Conservation Area

Highest point
- Peak: King Peak
- Elevation: 4,091 ft (1,247 m)
- Coordinates: 40°09′25″N 124°07′27″W

Geography
- Location within California Location within the United States
- Country: United States
- State: California
- County: Humboldt County
- Range coordinates: 40°09′54.506″N 124°08′3.141″W
- Topo map: USGS Shubrick Peak

The King Range is a mountain range of the Outer Northern California Coast Ranges system, located entirely within Humboldt County on the North Coast of California.

Much of the mountain range's area is protected within the King Range National Conservation Area, a National Conservation Area unit of the National Conservation Lands, and in the King Range Wilderness Area, both managed by the Bureau of Land Management (BLM).

== Geography ==
As part of the Northern Coast Ranges, the King Range runs parallel to the coast, and its western slopes fall steeply to the Pacific Ocean.

The King Range is adjacent to the Mendocino triple junction, where three tectonic plates – the Pacific plate, the North American plate, and the Juan de Fuca plate – meet. The area experiences frequent earthquakes.

Most mountains and ridges in the range are low to moderate in elevation. King Peak, at 4,091 feet (1,247 m), is the highest mountain in the range. Snow falls above 3,281 feet (1,000 m) a couple of times per year.

== Natural history ==
The range is part of the Northern California coastal forests ecoregion. It is largely forested with climax-dominant trees including coast Douglas fir (Pseudotsuga menziesii ssp. menziesii), oak (Quercus garryana and Q. kelloggii), and tanoak (Lithocarpus densiflorus), with pockets of sugar pine (Pinus lambertiana) found along steep slopes above the fog line.

The rivers and streams that drain the range include the Mattole River. Four federally endangered species occur in the range: the coho salmon, chinook salmon, steelhead, and northern spotted owl. Other wildlife includes the northern elephant seal, harbor seal, gray whale, brown pelican, bald eagle, peregrine falcon, black-tailed deer, mountain lion, bobcat, osprey, otter, gray fox and black bear.

== History ==
Historically, the King Range was home to the Native American Mattole and Sinkyone peoples. In the 19th century, the region was opened to commercial logging, fishing, ranching, and tanning.

In 1936 and 1937, due to the rugged terrain of the King Range and Mendocino Range to its south, engineers assigned to designing the new State Route 1 were forced to site the highway further inland/east towards the town of Leggett in its route north from Westport. Subsequently, the inaccessible coastal wilderness, known as the Lost Coast, remains the longest undeveloped stretch of coast in California.

In 1970 the U.S. Congress designated 60,000 acres (240 km^{2}) of the range as the King Range National Conservation Area. It is primarily located within southwestern Humboldt County, and extends into the far northwestern corner of Mendocino County.

In 2000 President Bill Clinton signed the law designating the rocks and islands just offshore as the California Coast National Monument.

In 2006 the U.S. Congress designated 42,585 acres (172.34 km^{2}) of the National Conservation Area as the King Range Wilderness. The California Coastal trail goes from end to end of the range.

== Gallery ==
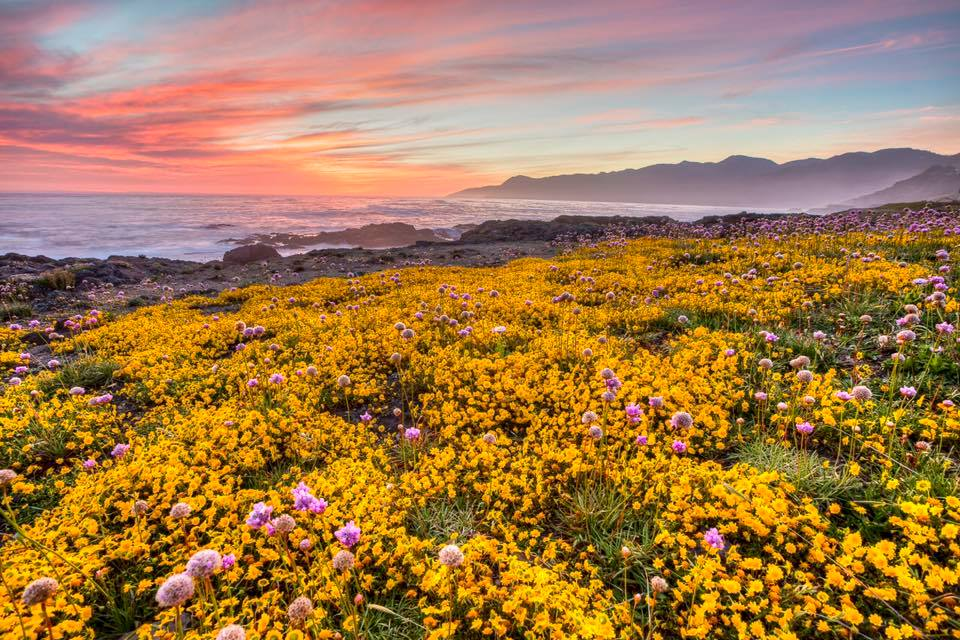
Wildflowers

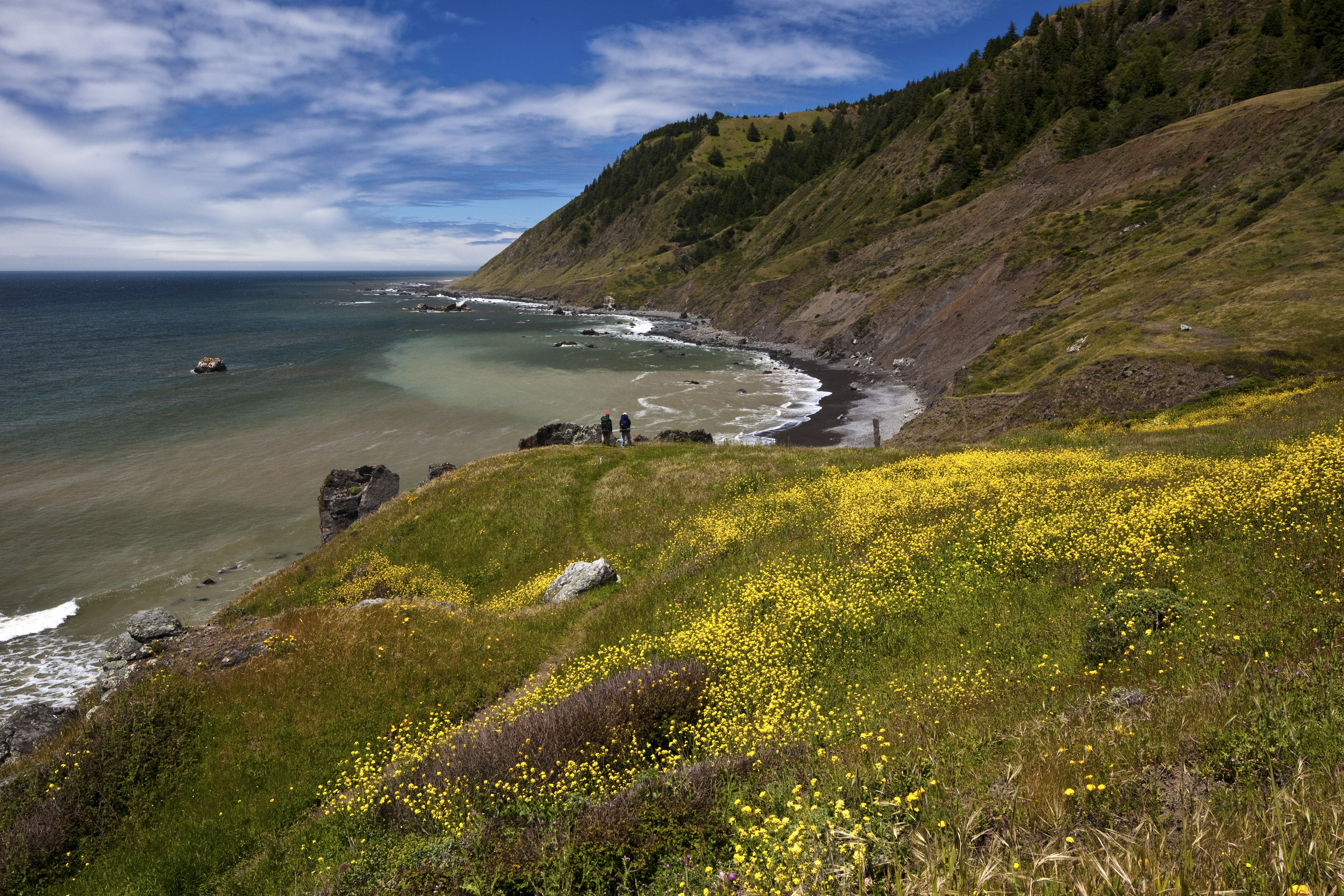
King Range cove

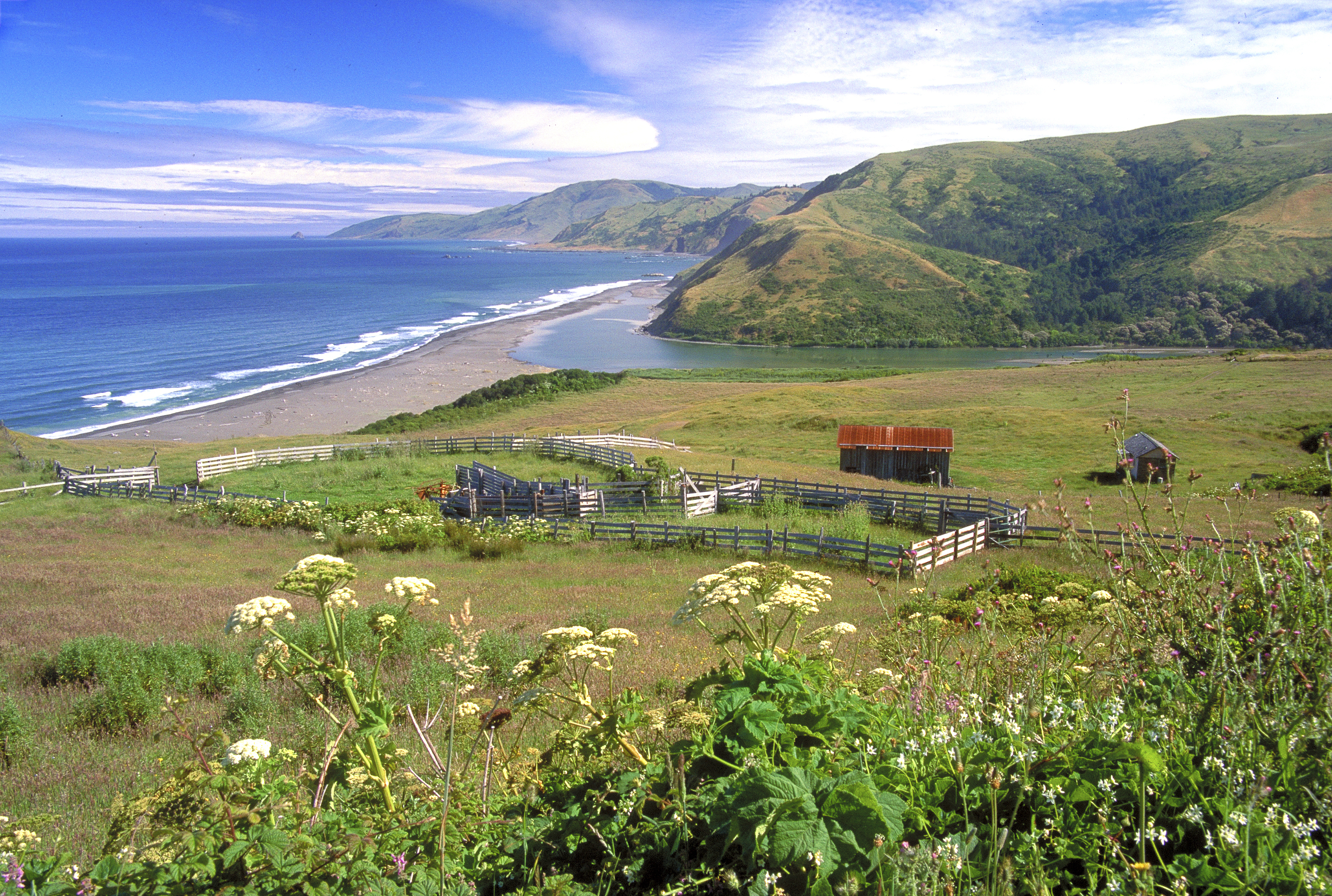
Old ranch and estuary

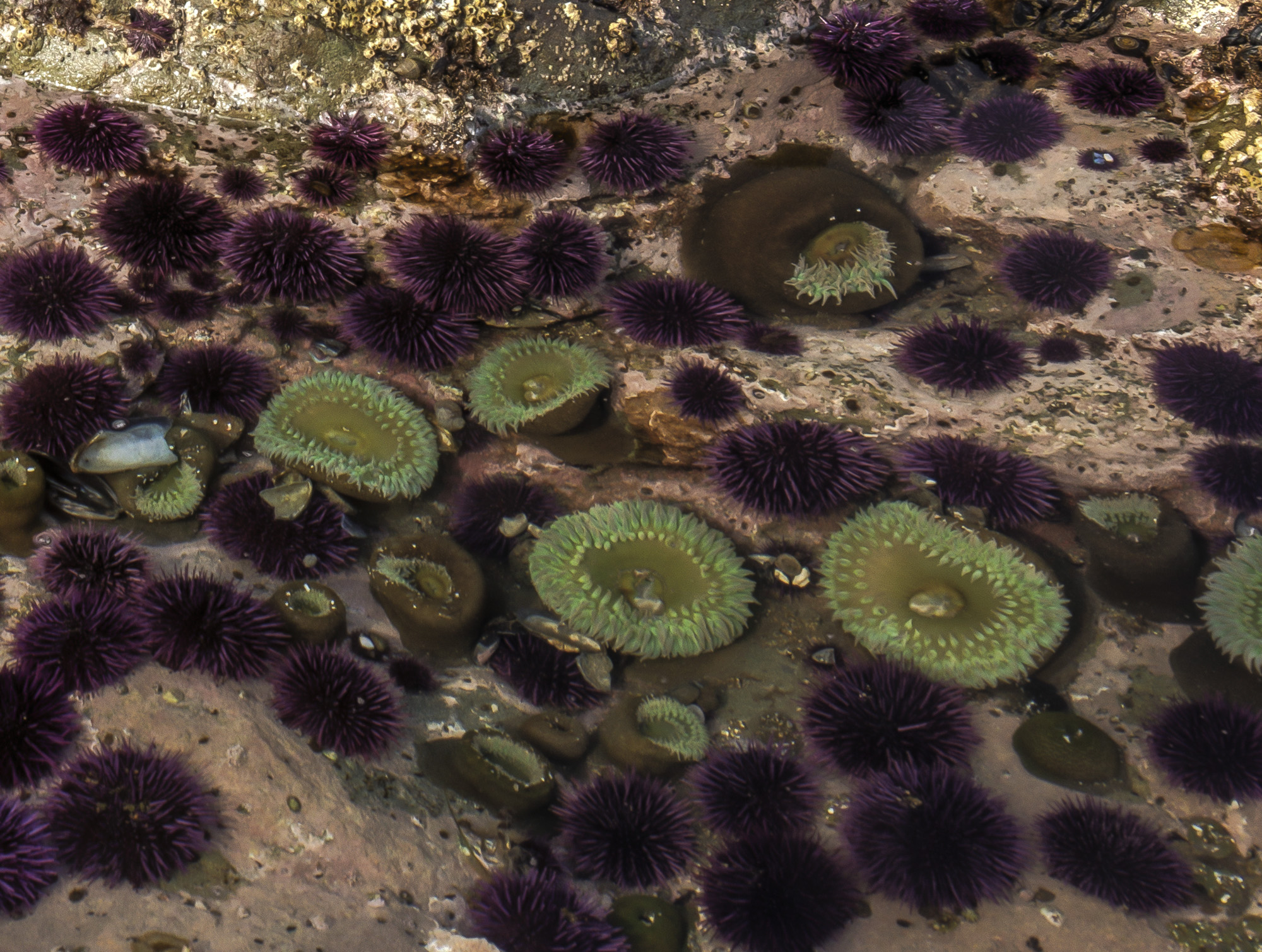
Purple sea urchins and Giant Green anemones, King Range tidepool

== See also ==
- Sinkyone Wilderness State Park
