= Lake Tahoe Basin Management Unit =

United States national forest

- Location within California
- Interactive map of Lake Tahoe Basin Management Unit
- Location: El Dorado and Placer counties in California, and Douglas County, Nevada U.S.
- Nearest city: Lake Tahoe, California
- Coordinates: 39°N 120°W
- Area: 154,851 acres (626.66 km^{2})
- Established: 1973
- Governing body: U.S. Forest Service
- Website: Lake Tahoe Basin Management Unit

A small pond in the Lake Tahoe Basin Management Unit.

The Lake Tahoe Basin Management Unit is a United States National Forest that manages and protects public land surrounding Lake Tahoe and the Lake Tahoe Basin. Straddling the state borders of California and Nevada in the Sierra Nevada, the LTBMU encompasses 154,851 acres (626 km^{2}) of National Forest system lands, ranging in altitude above sea level from 6,225 feet (1,897 m) at lake level to 10,881 feet (3,317 m) at Freel Peak. The U.S. Forest Service established the LTBMU in 1973. The name of the Lake Tahoe Basin Management Unit reflects a unique sort of National Forest.

== Goals ==
The Lake Tahoe Basin Management Unit (LTBMU) is responsible for the conservation, preservation and restoration of the Lake Tahoe watershed ecosystem within National Forest Lands. Projects and programs also include habitat, fire management, and urban lot management. Additionally the LTBMU provides and maintains high quality recreational opportunities for millions of visitors and residents annually.

Compared to other National Forest Lands the LTBMU is small, yet it is the Tahoe Basin's largest land manager, responsible for 78% of basin lands. As such the Forest Service has the largest single role in ecosystem and watershed management and protection. The LTBMU is a part of the National Forest System, yet is managed somewhat differently than other National Forests. Many common forest activities such as mining, grazing or timber harvesting are either not a part of LTBMU management or play a very small role. Since the lake is so dependent on all that happens around it, LTBMU programs manage the whole of the basin as a complete inter-dependent system.

The LTBMU is a unique inter-mix of forest and urban communities, presenting challenges and complexities few other National Forests experience. Since its establishment in 1973, the LTBMU has become a pioneer and leader in the science of forest and ecosystem management. The work of the Forest Service supports and is supported by many partners. Other federal, state and local agencies are working together in the effort to face challenges, conserve and restore natural and cultural resources, and enhance the recreational values of the Lake Tahoe Basin.

== History ==
In 1899 President William McKinley created the Lake Tahoe Forest Reserve, becoming the core of later National Forest Lands in the Tahoe Basin. Three separate forests were developed out of the reserve, the Tahoe, Eldorado and Toiyabe National Forests. Each of these forests extended into the basin and managed separate sections.

In 1973, the LTBMU was created from basin portions of the three existing National Forests, the Tahoe and Eldorado National Forests in California and the Toiyabe National Forest in Nevada, forming a single "management unit." This unification provided the focus needed for the basin, and more effective management of its watershed, ecological and recreational values.

== See also ==
- List of national forests of the United States
