= King Range Wilderness =

Protected wilderness area in California, United States

- IUCN category Ib (wilderness area)
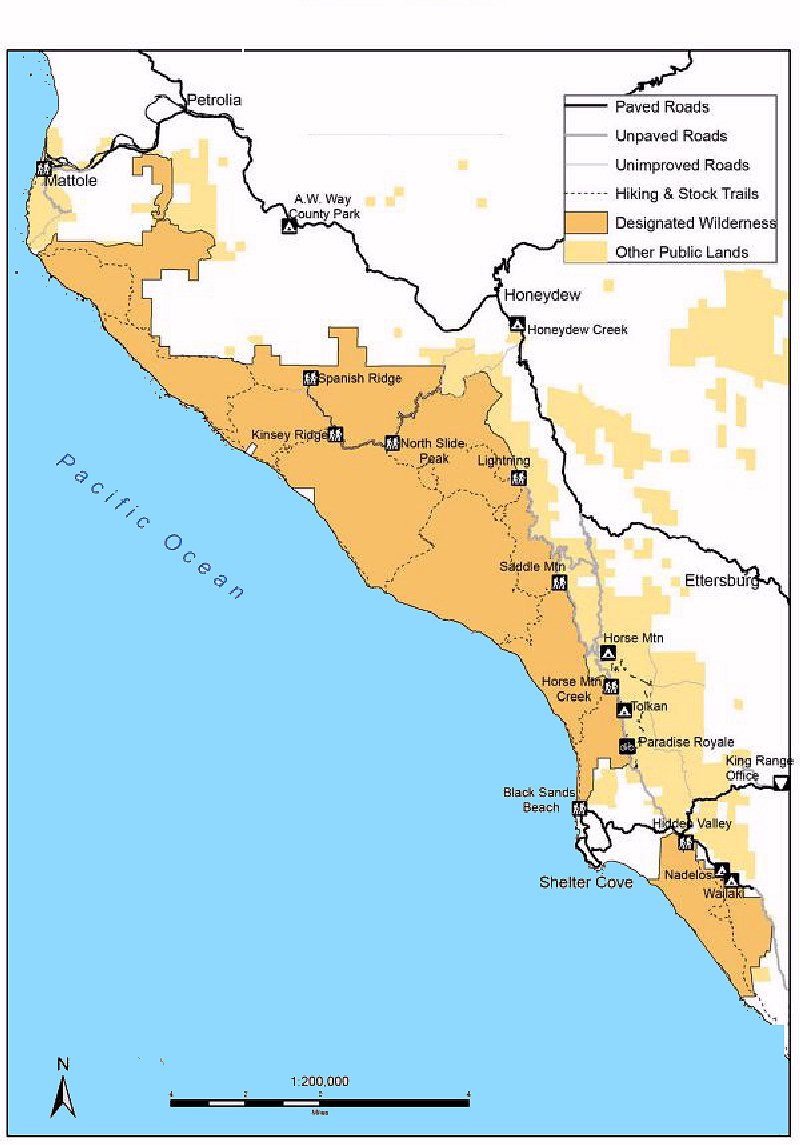
- Interactive map of King Range Wilderness
- Location: Humboldt County / Mendocino County
- Nearest city: Ferndale, California
- Coordinates: 40°09′55″N 124°08′03″W
- Area: 42,585 acres (172 km^{2})
- Established: 2006
- Governing body: Bureau of Land Management

The King Range Wilderness is a 42,585-acre (172 km^{2}) federally designated wilderness area within the King Range National Conservation Area in northern California, United States. The area was set aside with the passage of the Northern California Coastal Wild Heritage Wilderness Act of 2006 (Public Law 109–362). The Bureau of Land Management is the responsible agency. This section of California's coastline is known as the Lost Coast, a landscape too rugged for highway building, which forced the construction of State Highway 1 and U.S. 101 inland. The King Range Wilderness is the longest undeveloped coast, outside of Alaska, in the United States.

The Act of 2006 also set aside an area three geographical miles offshore as the Rocks and Islands Wilderness. It is the smallest wilderness area in the National Wilderness Preservation System, with a total size of five acres (2.0 ha).

The King Range is part of the Coast Ranges mountains and has the greatest relief in the shortest distance of all coast ranges in the state. In the lateral distance of three miles (5 km), the King Range rises from sea level to over 4,000 feet (1,200 m).

There are four areas of botanical significance: Old growth forest of Douglas-fir on the east slopes of King Range, dune system of the Mattole River, undisturbed coastal prairie, and coastal stands of reedgrass. Wildlife include black-tailed deer, black bear, mountain lion, and the re-introduced Roosevelt elk. Bird species include quail, grouse, dove, hawks, turkey vultures and osprey.

Marine animals include harbor seals, Steller and California sea lions, and river otter.

The Honeydew Creek Wildlife Preserve protects 2,980 acres (12 km^{2}) of habitat north of King Peak for bald eagle, northern spotted owl, mink and anadromous fish.

== Area history ==
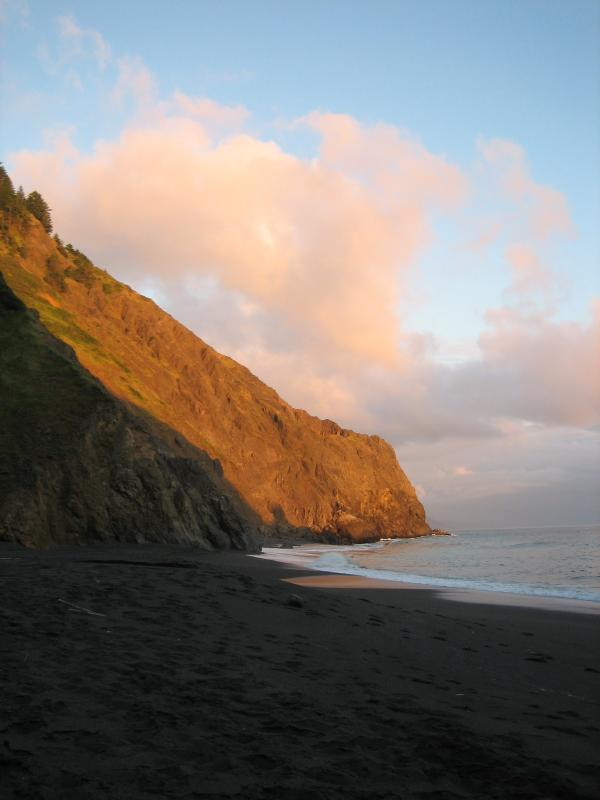
Sunset on the Lost Coast, California.

The earliest prehistoric sites in the coastal area are no older than 2,800 years, possibly because of geological uplifting and soil erosion. Early Native American artifacts found in the King Range suggest settlement by the Wiyot, then the Yurok by AD 1100. More recently, the Mattole, Sinkyone and Bear River peoples have lived in the area. From the 1570s through the 1800s, Spanish, American and Russian explorers and fur-trappers came to the area. By the 1880s, ranches and farms were supplying the demands of the mining communities and the growing settlements. Remains of old homestead ruins and their orchards can still be found throughout the King Range. With the advent of mechanized equipment, the area became more accessible, and the Douglas fir forests supplied lumber and an economic boom was underway by the 1940s with Humboldt County being the largest supplier in the state. Fishing also became a large economic industry, especially for salmon.

On December 10, 1929, President Herbert Hoover issued Executive Order 5237 at the request of the state that withdrew several parcels from settlement as public land. California's State Division of Beaches and Parks saw recreational potential in the King Range, but the land remained unclassified until the 1950s. Congressman Clem Miller introduced a bill in 1961 to establish the national conservation area, and had support from organizations such as the Sierra Club and the Mattole Action Committee. Although Congressman Miller died in a plane crash in 1962, another member of Congress, Don Clausen, continued Miller's work and the bill was signed into law by 1970.

== Climate ==
The area gets some of the highest rainfall totals in the continental United States, with over 100 inches (2,500 mm) of rain yearly in the Mattole River valley. In addition, coastal fog brings moisture during the summer months. Although the inland areas can have summer temperatures over 100 °F (38 °C), the cold waters of the Pacific Ocean moderates coastal temperatures to an average of 60 °F (16 °C). The extreme vertical rise of the mountains create intense rain showers (called orographic, meaning terrain-induced), caused by the lifting of storms as they approach the steep topography. The watersheds are flooded regularly as a result. There are weather anomalies here also; less coastal fog than other coastal parts of the state, and the prevailing wind is from the northeast-east instead of westerly.

== Waterways ==
=== Mattole River and estuary ===
The Mattole River's mainstem is 62 miles (100 km) in length and has more than 74 tributaries. It has historically had large runs of salmon and steelhead trout, but due to past logging, road building and severe floods in 1955 and 1964, all of which impacted the river, fish numbers have declined. The coho salmon is a federally listed threatened species (Southern Oregon/Northern California populations) that use the Mattole River and its tributary, Mill Creek. Increased sediment and lack of tree cover reduced the quality and quantity of fish habitat by increasing summer water temperatures. The Environmental Protection Agency added the Mattole River to the state's list of impaired watersheds in 1992.

The Mattole Estuary is where the waters of the land meet and mix with the tidewaters of the Pacific Ocean, and acts as a settling basin for both river sediment and sand from ocean waves, and will eventually fill to become a meadow. The Bureau of Land Management designated the Mattole Estuary as an "Area of Critical Environmental Concern" in 1981. This area, now at more than 650 acres (2.6 km^{2}), has significant cultural, historic, wildlife and habitat resources.

The watershed, or catchbasin of the river has been seriously impacted from past road building, and restoration efforts include abandonment of some roadways as well as reshaping and upgrading of others. Other fish species in the Mattole River include the Pacific lamprey, threespine stickleback, and the starry flounder.

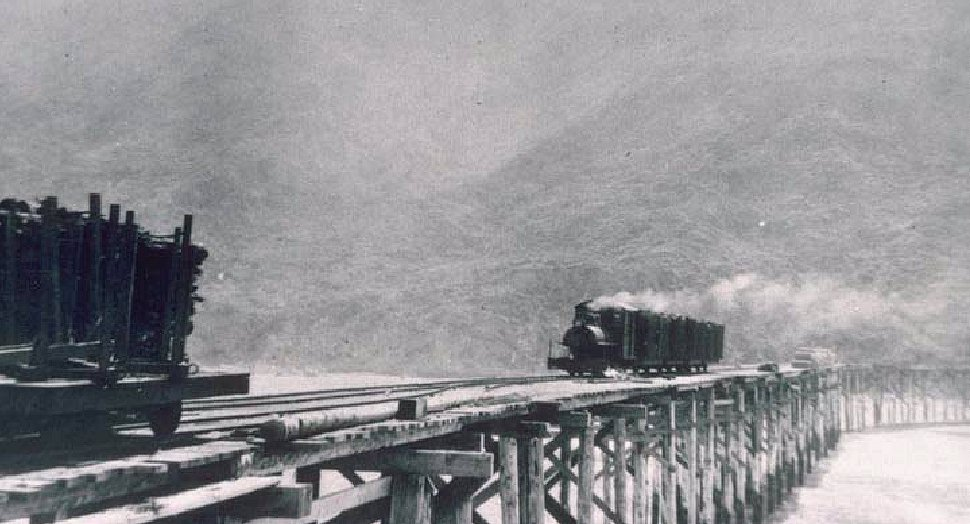
Few traces remain of the train trestle across the mouth of the Mattole River.

The historic Punta Gorda Lighthouse located near the estuary of the Mattole River.

==== Other waterways ====
The streams flowing into the Pacific from the west side have both anadromous and resident fish as well as amphibians and reptiles. The largest of these waterways are Big Creek and Big Flat Creek. All the coastal streams have been identified as unique in habitat and variety of species . Restoration efforts by both public land agencies and nonprofit groups has been going on since the 1970s with the restoration projects focused on the Mattole River, its estuary, tributaries, and the river's lower reach area.

== Vegetation ==
In the 1970s and 80s, the Bureau of Land Management purchased and/or exchanged more than 25,000 acres (100 km^{2}) of lands within the national conservation area under the authority of Section 5 of the King Range Act. Most of the timber had either been harvested historically, or had been cut just before acquisition. Harvest methods included high grading, or removal of the best trees, leaving scattered large Douglas-fir trees. Reforestation was not practiced and a large percentage of the previously harvested land was left to regenerate naturally. Tanoak and madrone trees now dominate what had once been old-growth Douglas-fir forest. Several areas were planted after acquisition by the BLM, including the Bear Trap Creek area (125,000 Douglas-fir trees on 200 acres (0.81 km^{2}) since 1985.) Other vegetation in the area include knobcone pine, laurel, manzanita, poison oak, blackberry, Oregon grape and salal.

Several varieties of mushrooms occur in the King Range including matsutake, which grows under the closed-canopy tanoak stands. The edible matsutake mushroom is collected for personal and commercial use and a collection permit is required.

Another important plant found here is beargrass, used by Native Americans historically and continuing in the present, for basketry. The BLM's Final Environmental Impact Report recommends beargrass habitat improvements, such as controlled burning and brush removal, to increase growth which would reduce harvesting pressure on existing limited distribution of the plant. Other native coastal grasses include reedgrass (a state-listed rare plant), oatgrass and bentgrass, all of which form the coastal prairie plant community.

== California Coastal National Monument ==
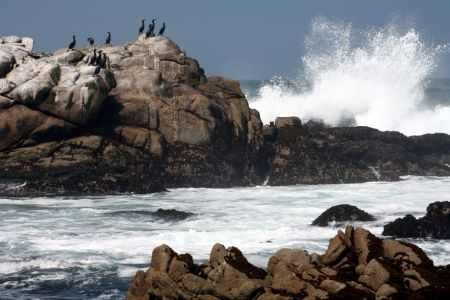
California Coastal National Monument

President Bill Clinton established the California Coastal National Monument (CCNM) on January 11, 2000, under the authority of the Antiquities Act of 1906. The purpose of the CCNM, as stated in the Presidential Proclamation, is to protect and manage biological and geological resources by protecting "all unappropriated or unreserved lands and interest in the lands owned or controlled by the United States in the form of islands, rocks, exposed reefs, and pinnacles above mean high tide within 12 nautical miles (22 km) of the shoreline of the State of California". The proclamation also functions to elevate California's offshore lands to a national level of concern and focuses management on protection of geologic features and lifeforms. The CCNM has more than 20,000 rocks and islands and extends more than 1,000 acres (4.0 km^{2}) along California's coast.

=== Rocks and Islands Wilderness ===
The Rocks and Islands Wilderness is within the National Monument, just offshore of the King Range, and protects important habitat for seabirds and marine mammals as well as the coastal scenic beauty. The bill to designate the wilderness area was introduced by Representative Sam Farr in June 1999 and became part of the Northern California Coastal Heritage Wilderness Act passed by Congress in 2006. The bill (H.R.2277) sums up the reason for the wilderness with four points:

- The California coastal rocks and islands are a critical component of a unique ecosystem of California.
- The California coastal rocks and islands comprise a narrow flight lane in the Pacific Flyway, providing protected nest sites as well as feeding and perching areas for millions of seabirds.
- This unique ecosystem is also important for the continued survival of endangered or threatened sea mammals, such as Steller sea lions and elephant seals.
- Designation of the California coastal rocks and islands as wilderness would add a significant natural component to the National Wilderness Preservation System.

== Other points of interest ==
The 3-mile (4.8 km) long Black Sands beach, although not within the wilderness, it is an access point to the Lost Coast Trail.

The Lost Coast National Recreation Trail is almost 25 miles (40 km) in length and is mostly level beachwalking. The trail is described by the nonprofit group, American Trails, as a "serious backpacking trek". Much of the route is along the beach, and there are many sections poising uniques challenges including: long fields of large slippery boulders, miles of soft sand and two 4-mile long stretches that can only be safely completed at low tide. At several places along the trail, creeks bisect as they drain from the westside canyons into the ocean. Campsites along the trail are mostly on sandy river shoals at these creek crossings, just above sea level and some yards back from the shoreline. These are also the only fresh water locations along the trail. A permit system is in place affecting hikers and backpackers who plan to spend at least one night in the King Range Conservation Area, including the Lost Coast Trail.
