= Stephen William Shaw =

American painter (1817–1900)

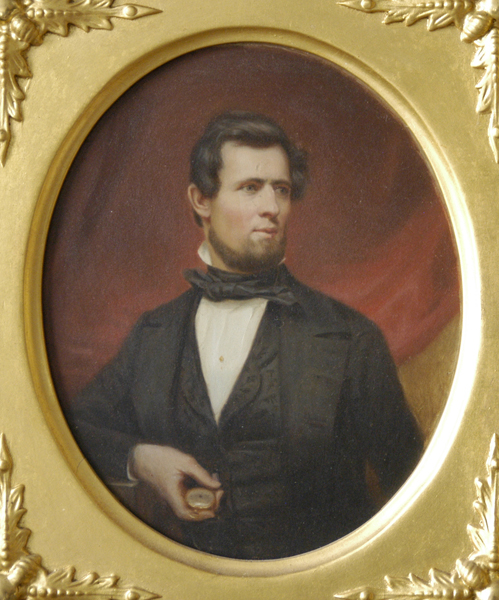
- Self-portrait
- Born: December 15, 1817; Windsor, Vermont
- Died: February 12, 1900 (aged 82); San Francisco, California
- Education: Norwich Military Academy
- Known for: Oils
- Notable work: Portraits of Prominent Pioneer Californians
- Patrons: Judge E.B. Crocker

Stephen William Shaw (December 15, 1817 – February 12, 1900) was a California '49er and portrait painter who helped discover and name Humboldt Bay and introduced viticulture to Sonoma County by 1864.

== Early life ==
Stephen W. Shaw was born December 15, 1817, at Windsor, Vermont, to Seth and Elizabeth Barrett Shaw, descendants of Puritans and American Revolutionaries. He became a self-taught painter. As a young adult, Shaw taught drawing and penmanship at Norwich Military Academy, and in Wooster, Ohio, between 1841 and 1842, Shaw advertised to execute portraits in Crayon in Wooster, Ohio in September 1842, then became an art teacher and director of the Boston Athenaeum before moving to the American South and making his living as an itinerant portraitist. In 1845, shortly after opening a studio in Lexington, Kentucky, Shaw painted his first known oil portrait. A year later, in Baton Rouge, Shaw painted a portrait of General Zachary Taylor which won a silver medal at the American Institute. In 1848, Shaw was commissioned for $1,000 by the City of New Orleans for a portrait of native son Persifer F. Smith. Shaw traveled to Veracruz and Mexico City, painting the portrait on his return to New Orleans.

Joining the California Gold Rush, Shaw left New Orleans aboard the merchant steamer Isthmus, on April 21, 1849. After crossing the Isthmus of Panama, he booked passage on the Dutch bark, Alexander von Humboldt, which left Panama on May 20, 1849. Becalmed for five weeks, they reached Acapulco July 6 where the passengers forced the owners off the boat due to poor provisioning and overcrowding. After more than three months voyage, the ship finally arrived in San Francisco, August 30, 1849 and was sold for $17,000 to satisfy the passengers' lien against the owners. One of the other passengers, Collis P. Huntington, formed an association of the 365 survivors of the 102-day passage, called "The Society of the Humboldter." Huntington sponsored reunions and at least one commemorative poster; the last four members met on August 30, 1899.

Contrary to at least one published report, neither ships' manifest lists Shaw's brother Seth Shaw who was elsewhere reported to have crossed the country overland in 1850. Huntington, a large group of fellow passengers, and Stephen Shaw immediately went to the gold mines at Mormon Island for about six months, then Shaw moved to Sacramento for February and March 1850, where he met future judge Edwin B. Crocker, brother of railroad baron Charles Crocker, for whom he would paint more than 25 portraits of notable Californians.

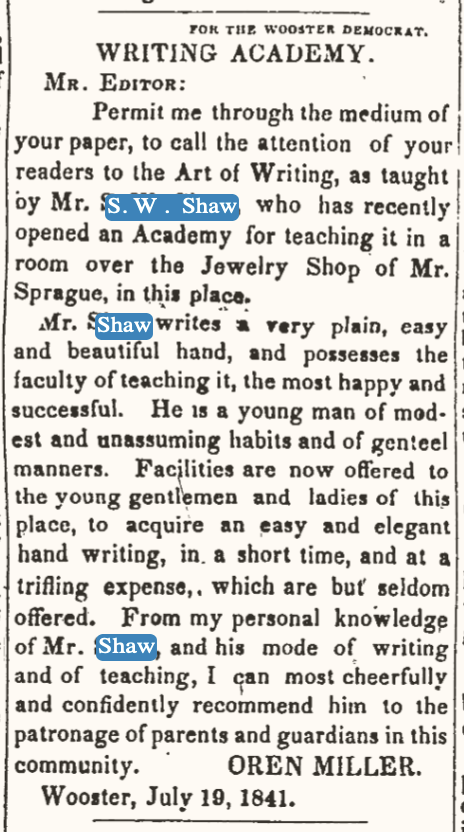
1841 announcement of a Writing Academy opened by S. W. Shaw in Wooster, Ohio.

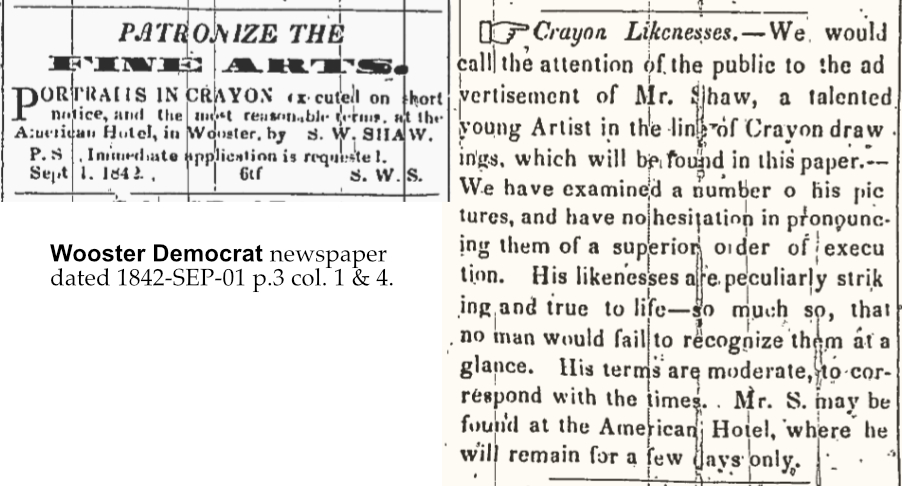
1842 Wooster Democrat newspaper ad by S. W. Shaw to execute portraits in crayon.

== Discovery of Humboldt Bay ==
In March 1850, Shaw left San Francisco on the schooner Laura Virginia, under Captain Douglass Ottenger. They were racing to find an economic route to the northern California gold mines. While sailing close inshore they saw an enclosed body of water but were unable to determine if it was open to the sea. Ottinger anchored in Trinidad Bay where expedition director E. H. Howard chose Shaw and four others to join him exploring on land. The men followed the coast south. They were ferried across Mad River by Indians, then continued along the shore until they reached the entrance that they had come to find. After camping overnight, the men returned to Trinidad where they rejoined the Laura Virginia.

From the sea, the entrance to the bay was masked by lines of breakers. The depth was unknown. Rather than risk the schooner in an attempt to enter, Captain Ottinger sent in a boat. Second mate Hans Henry Buhne and crew succeeded in taking the boat over the bar and landing on a point opposite the entrance. Climbing the nearby bluff, Buhne could clearly make out the channel between two lines of breakers. As they returned to the schooner they sounded the channel. That same day, together with a second boat, they carried in passengers and supplies. Buhne rejoined the schooner, and on April 14, 1850, piloted the Laura Virginia into the bay. Shaw sketched the first views of the bay and proposed that it be named Humboldt Bay honoring the naturalist Alexander von Humboldt. On April 26, 1850, the San Francisco Daily Journal of Commerce published a wood engraving based on his sketches of Humboldt Bay. Shaw returned to San Francisco on the steamer Sea Gull April 5, 1851.

== From Sutter's to farming in Humboldt County ==
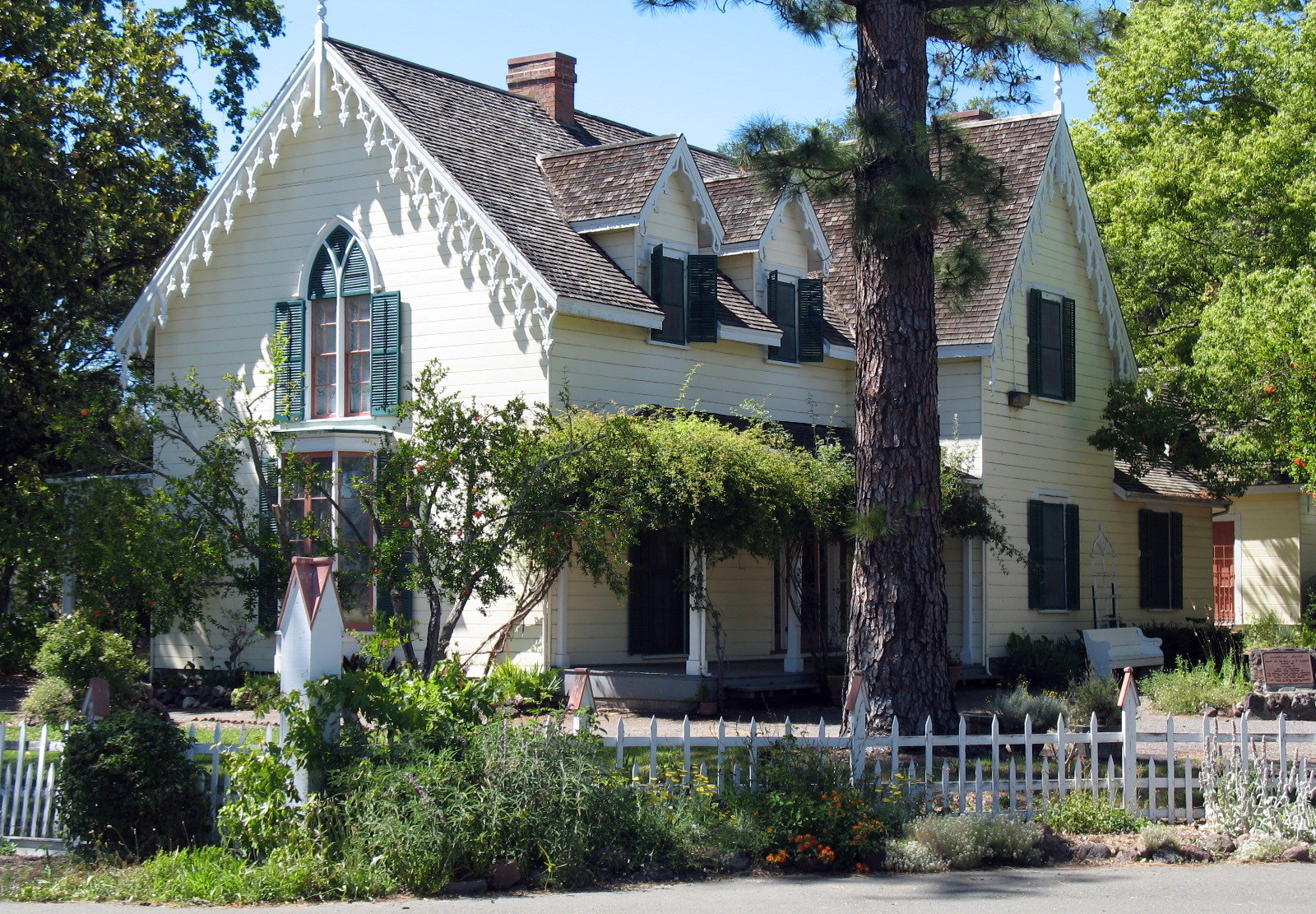
Vallejo's Estate

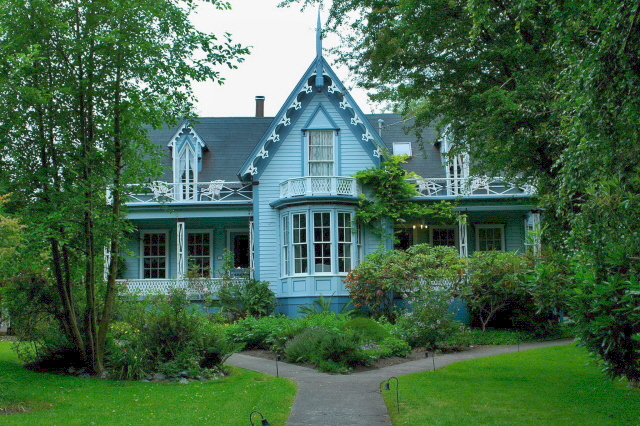
The (Seth) Shaw House in Ferndale, California

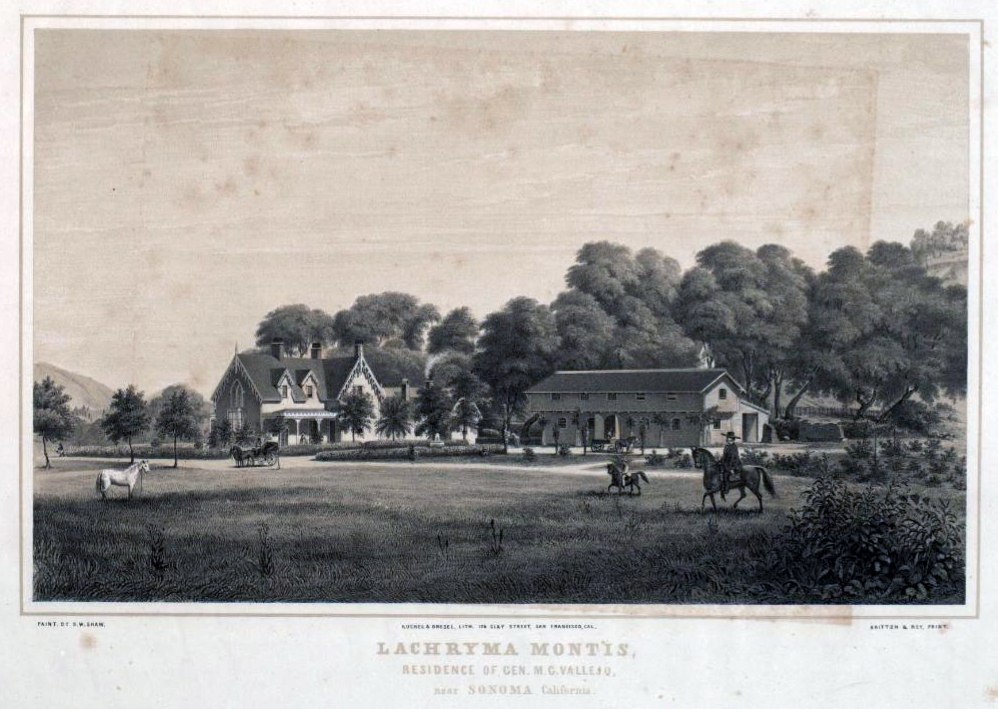
Shaw's 1857 print

It is likely Shaw's drawings of "Lachryma Montis", the Carpenter Gothic home of General Vallejo's in Sonoma, influenced his brother's construction of the Shaw House in Ferndale.

In 1851, Shaw spent much of the year with John Augustus Sutter at Hock Farm on the Feather River as the family portrait painter and general business agent. Following a brief engagement to Sutter's daughter, Ann "Eliza" Sutter (1828 – March 1895), Shaw returned to San Francisco, and later in 1852, with his brother Seth Shaw and Willard Allen, settled on Table Bluff, near Loleta.

In summer 1852, they moved across the Eel River and began clearing the area where the town of Ferndale, California, would later be incorporated. In the rainy winter of 1852–1853, twelve men, including Seth Kinman, stayed with the Shaws because theirs was the most finished cabin. Shaw spent the next two years coaxing plants to grow in the cold coastal fog. Around 1852, he painted the portrait of Wiyot elder Kiwelattah (or Ki-we-lah-tah). Finally, with little to show for his labors, Shaw returned to San Francisco in 1854 and later sold his claim to Ferndale settler Francis Francis, in 1856.

== San Francisco portrait painter ==
Shaw moved quickly in the big city, setting up studio, joining the Mason's California Lodge No. 1 in San Francisco June 1, 1854 and painting more than 200 portraits of Masonic Officers, possibly from photographs. Shaw took first prize for best portrait in oils at the 1860 California State Fair.

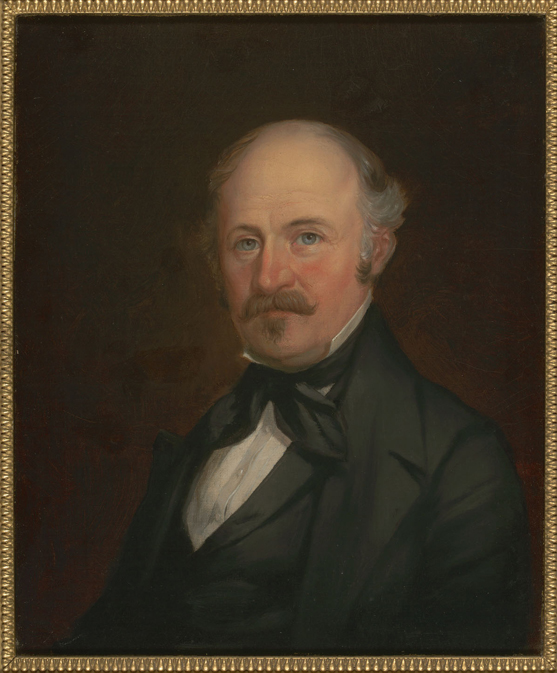
John Augustus Sutter, June 1851 by Stephen W. Shaw, oil painting approximately 24 inches

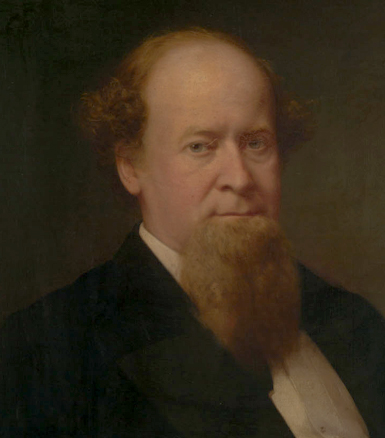
John B. Felton, c. 1854 by Stephen W. Shaw

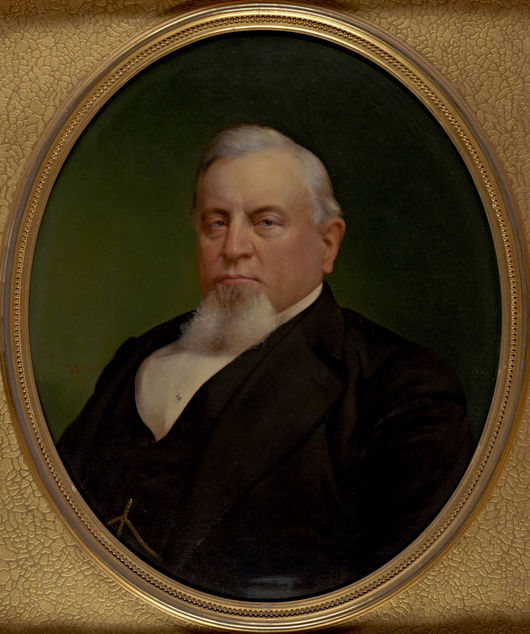
Charles Crocker, c. 1872 by Stephen W. Shaw

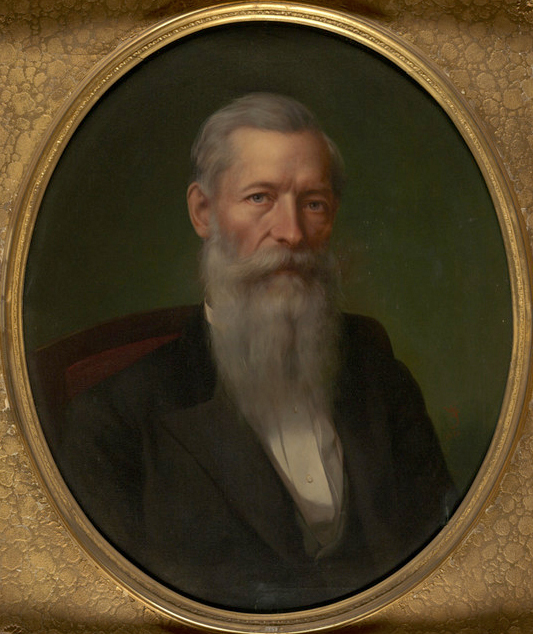
Mark Hopkins, Jr., c. 1872 by Stephen W. Shaw

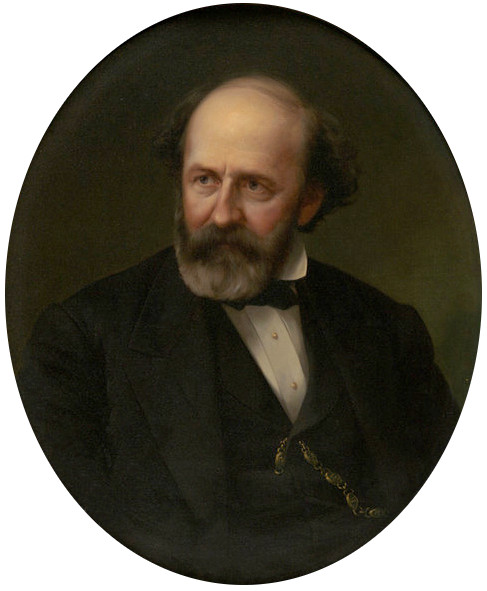
Collis P. Huntington, c. 1872 by Stephen W. Shaw, oil painting 30 x 30 inches

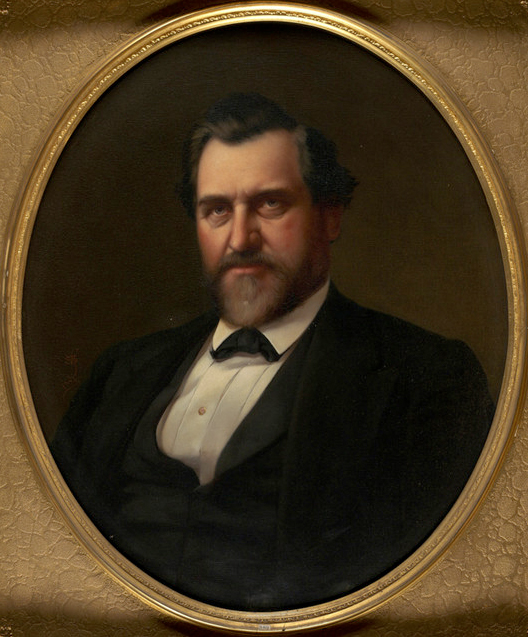
Leland Stanford, c. 1872 by Stephen W. Shaw

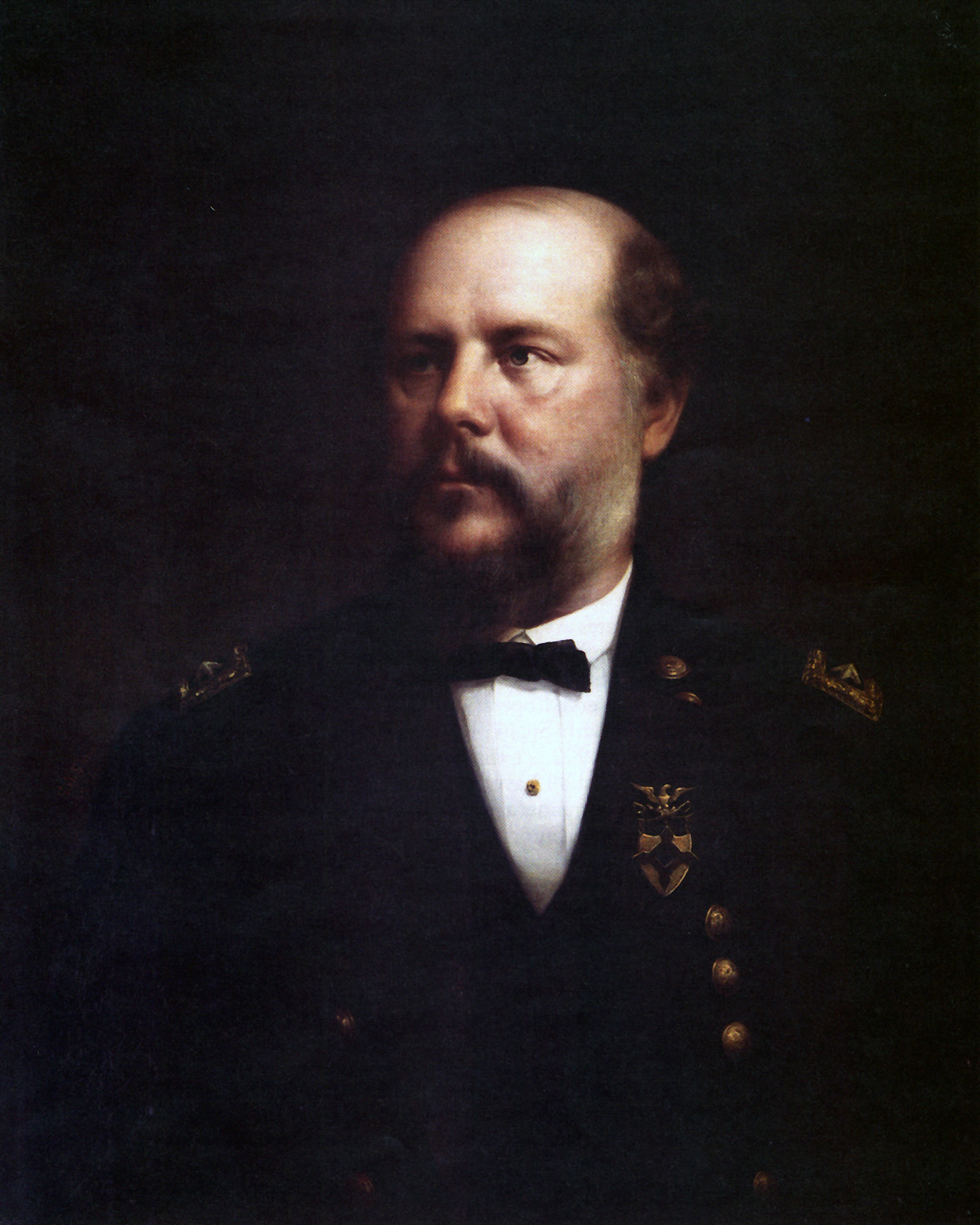
Major General John McAllister Schoefield, 1874, by Stephen W. Shaw

On April 18, 1861, Shaw married Mary Frances Meacham at the First Unitarian Church in San Francisco. Shaw grew grapes and is credited with introducing wine grape cultivation to Sonoma County. The Shaws had two children before Mary died October 2, 1866. Shaw spent 1871 abroad and married Lucretia Swain of Nantucket, Massachusetts August 12, 1873, on his return to San Francisco.

Shaw died February 14, 1900, in San Francisco, memorialized in an obituary in the San Francisco Examiner, 16 February 1900.

== Memberships ==
Shaw was a member of the Masons, the Society of California Pioneers, The Bohemian Club, the Mechanics' Institute and the San Francisco Art Association.

== Paintings and manuscripts ==
Many of Shaw's paintings were lost to the fires of the 1906 San Francisco earthquake; those remaining are known to be in collections of the Bancroft Library, M. H. de Young Memorial Museum, Fine Arts Museum of San Francisco, the Oakland Museum, City of New Orleans, Nantucket Historical Society, the Crocker Art Museum of Sacramento, The Ferndale Museum, The Clarke Historical Museum, and the Society of California Pioneers. Shaw painted several family portraits including his mother Elizabeth Barrett Shaw (c. 1860s), brother Sylvanus Harvey Shaw (both at the Ferndale Museum), and brother Seth Shaw (Ferndale's Masonic Temple) and Seth's wife Isabella Shaw (Ferndale Museum). Shaw descendants preserve another portrait of Seth, a portrait of Seth's wife Isabella Shaw, a small landscape, a self-portrait, and his original copy of A Record Book of the Farm.

Notables painted by Shaw include:

- Louis Agassiz, Harvard Naturalist
- Col. Edward D. Baker, U.S. Senator and confidant of Abraham Lincoln (E.B. Crocker Collection #196)
- R.B. Blowers, Woodland, California, grower and grape transport pioneer (E.B. Crocker Collection #748)
- Peter Burnett, first governor of California, (E.B. Crocker Collection #210)
- David C. Broderick, U.S. Senator, (E.B. Crocker Collection #206)
- Charles Crocker, 1872 (E.B. Crocker Collection #383)
- Judge E.B. Crocker, 1872 (E.B. Crocker Collection #384)
- Isaac Elphinston Davis, (1833–1888) passenger on the Alexander von Humboldt (private collection)
- Mrs. Isaac Elphinston Davis (private collection)
- John Brooks Felton, half-length oil portrait (Bancroft Library)
- Capt. J.L. Folsom (E.B. Crocker Collection #205)
- John W. Geary, first mayor of San Francisco
- Hon. Edward Gilbert, (E.B. Crocker Collection #193)
- William M. Gwin, U.S. Senator, (E.B. Crocker Collection #200)
- Col. Jack Hays, sheriff of San Francisco 1850 (E.B. Crocker Collection #211)
- Thomas Hill, American landscape artist, (E.B. Crocker Collection #207)
- Collis P. Huntington, 1872 (E.B. Crocker Collection #380)
- Maj. Gen. H.W. Halleck, General, lawyer and land speculator, (E.B. Crocker Collection #195)
- Mark Hopkins, 1872 (E.B. Crocker Collection #387)
- Andrew Jackson, seventh United States President. 1872, (E.B. Crocker Collection #87)
- Thomas Starr King, Unitarian Minister, (E.B. Crocker Collection #197)
- Kiwelattah (or Ki-we-lah-tah), c.1852 full-length painting of Wiyot elder (Clarke Historical Museum)
- Thomas O. Larkin, U.S. Consulm (E.B. Crocker Collection #209)
- Peter Lassen, California Pioneer (E.B. Crocker Collection #198)
- Jacob P. Leese, California Pioneer (E.B. Crocker Collection #203)
- S.S. Montague, Chief engineer Central Pacific Railroad, (E.B. Crocker Collection #385)
- Hon. Romualdo Pacheco, American politician and diplomat (E.B. Crocker Collection #208)
- Samuel Purdy, (E.B. Crocker Collection #204)
- William C. Ralston, founder of the Bank of California (M. H. de Young Memorial Museum)
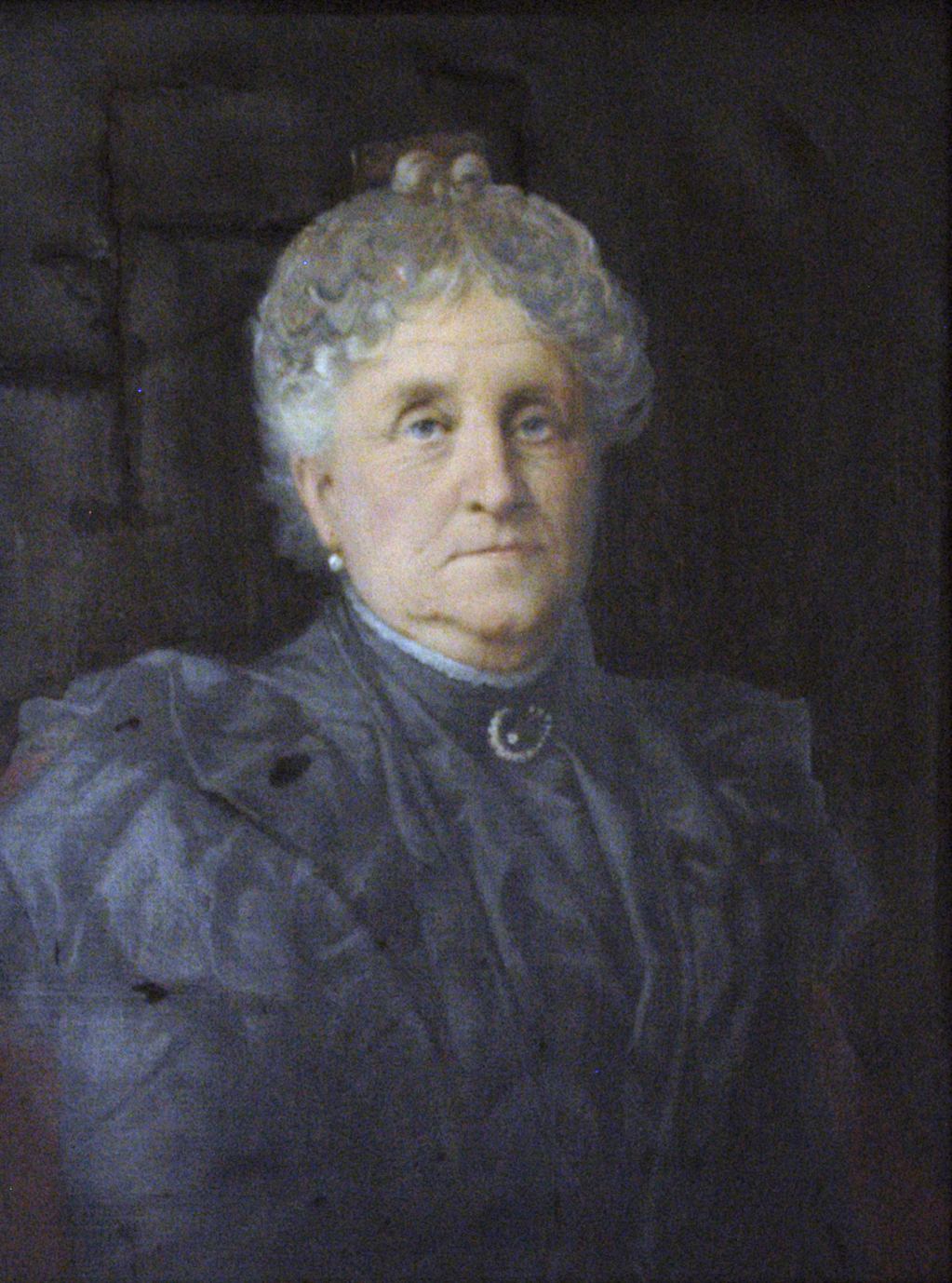
- Portrait of Isabella Shaw, wife of Seth Shaw, by his brother Stephen William Shaw. Ferndale Museum
- Alfred Macy, (1831–1874) Governor's Council of Massachusetts (Nantucket Historical Society)
- Edmond Randolph, (1818–1861) California lawyer and historian (E.B. Crocker Collection #199)
- Robert Robinson, (E.B. Crocker Collection #202)
- Isabella Shaw (Ferndale Museum)
- Brigadier General Persifor Frazer Smith, 1848 (City of New Orleans)
- Leland Stanford, 1872 (E.B. Crocker Collection #382)
- Col. J.D. Stevenson, mining and real estate entrepreneur (E.B. Crocker Collection #192)
- General John A. Sutter, June 1851 (Bancroft Library)
- General John A. Sutter, (E.B. Crocker Collection #194 – different than 1851 portrait)
- Zachary Taylor, 1846 then General in the Mexican–American War, later President of the United States.
- Mariano Vallejo, Californian military commander, politician, and rancher, (E.B. Crocker Collection #201)
- Vallejo family portraits (Vallejo Home State Park, Sonoma, California)
