= Palace Saloon =

Historic commercial building in California, U.S.

Coordinates: 40°34′34.05″N 124°15′51.88″W

- M. H. Donnelly Building
- U.S. Historic district – Contributing property
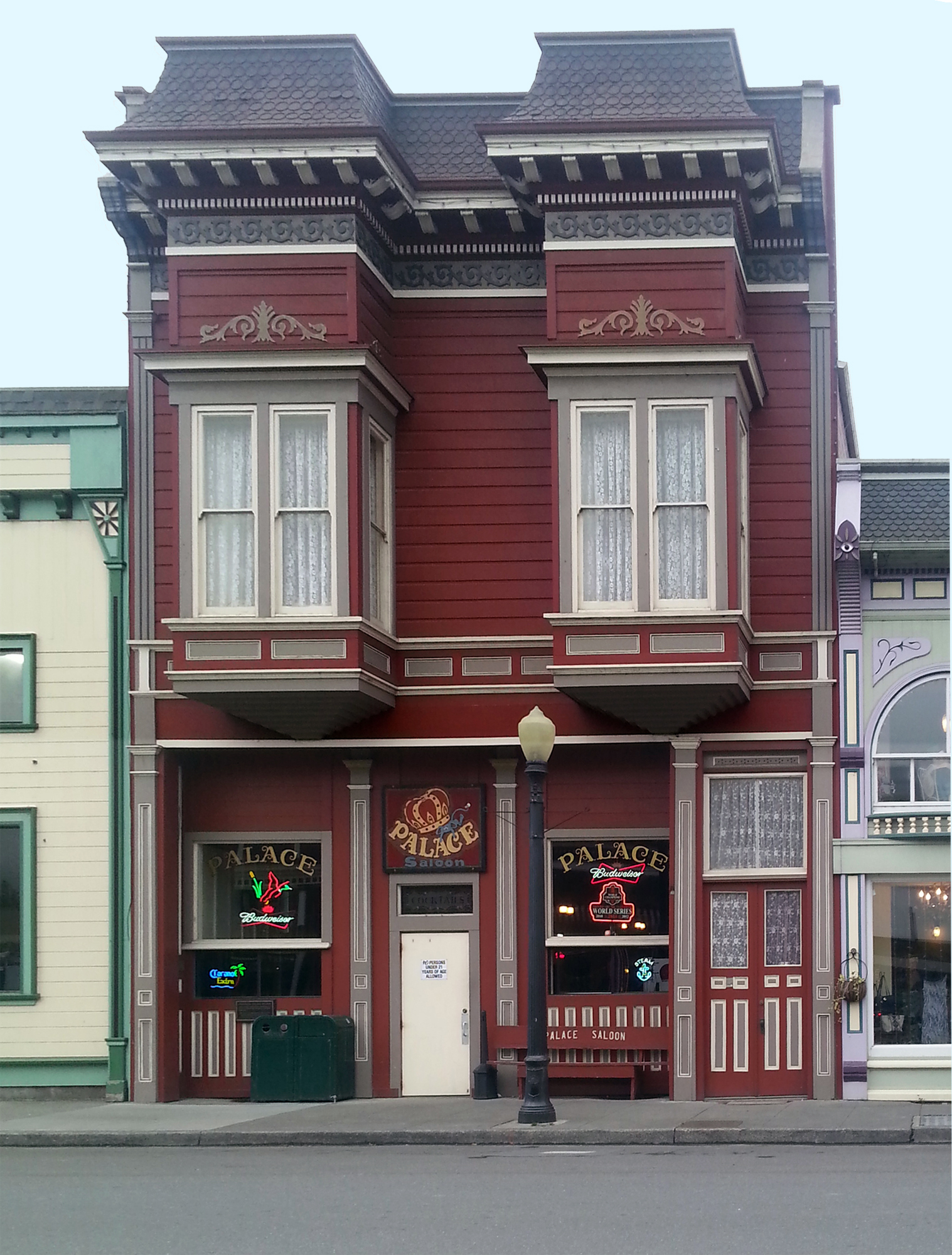
- The Palace Saloon
- Location: 341–353 Main Street; Ferndale, California
- Built: 1891
- Built by: George Milnes
- Part of: Ferndale Main Street Historic District (ID93001461)
- Added to NRHP: 10 January 1994

The Palace Saloon, also called the M. H. Donnelly Building, is a 1902 two-story commercial building located at 341–353 Main Street, Ferndale, California. It was built to be a Saloon with offices above. The facade features a decorated false-front and two projecting bays topped by twin mansard roofs giving a French Second Empire appearance. The Donnelly Building is a contributing property in the Ferndale Main Street Historic District which was added on 10 January 1994 to the National Register of Historic Places.

== History ==
M. H. Donnelly purchased L. Canepa's saloon in the Foster building at the north east corner of Main and Brown. They named this business the "Palace Saloon" and other members of their family arrived in town to help with the business, but by November, the Palace was moving out and the Foster building was renovated for B. O. Hart of Eureka's saloon.

M. H. Donnelly bought 341–353 Main Street, next to the "Brick Store". John Morris and sons razed the old Rochdale store. Construction began in late April on the 30x75 foot building. George Milnes superintended construction for Mr. Donnelly and his brother John. It included both the saloon and offices above the bar. The grand opening was held on September 6, 1902.

The late hours kept by the saloon have averted at least one fire. Mr. Donnelly was the first to call in a fire alarm in October 1905 on an adjoining building – which was saved.

The San Francisco Earthquake of 1906 heavily damaged the Palace plaster and windows as well as breaking the stock of liquor bottles.

In 1909 gas lighting was installed in the building. In 1917 M. H. Donnelly sold the Palace to his partner Mike Matteri and retired. In 1929, the building was sold again, now described as a "billiard parlor and soft-drink emporium of Bravo and Arnibaldi".

The upstairs offices were rented to dentists, club rooms, a billiard club, attorney-at-law, stenographer, dressmaker, millinery, justice of the peace office, collection agency and medical doctors as well as residential apartments since 1902.

In 1960, the building was operated as both a saloon and a liquor store.

The building was damaged by the 1992 Cape Mendocino earthquakes. It was at that time the short modern windows were installed downstairs.

By 1992 the building was covered in asbestos shingles which were removed after a 2007 fire and the building restored to original condition except for the short, modern windows above the lower siding and the modern door.

The building was purchased by the owners of the Ivanhoe hotel in 2016 changing nothing inside. Two pool tables, a full sized shuffleboard and the original 40-foot bar are still in place in the building.

There is a plaque on the building which says it is the "furthest western bar in the conterminous United States."

== Architectural elements ==
The first floor has been modified, but the second floor retains the twin rectangular bay windows, on which the trim has been restored in 2008 to the original appearance. The bays are topped by mansard roofs which are shingled and have box cornices with dentils and brackets as well as a parapet wall. Behind the false-front the roof is pitched and has skylights. Much of the original ornate woodwork survives.
