= Ferndale Main Street Historic District =

Historic district in California, United States

- U.S. National Register of Historic Places
- U.S. Historic district
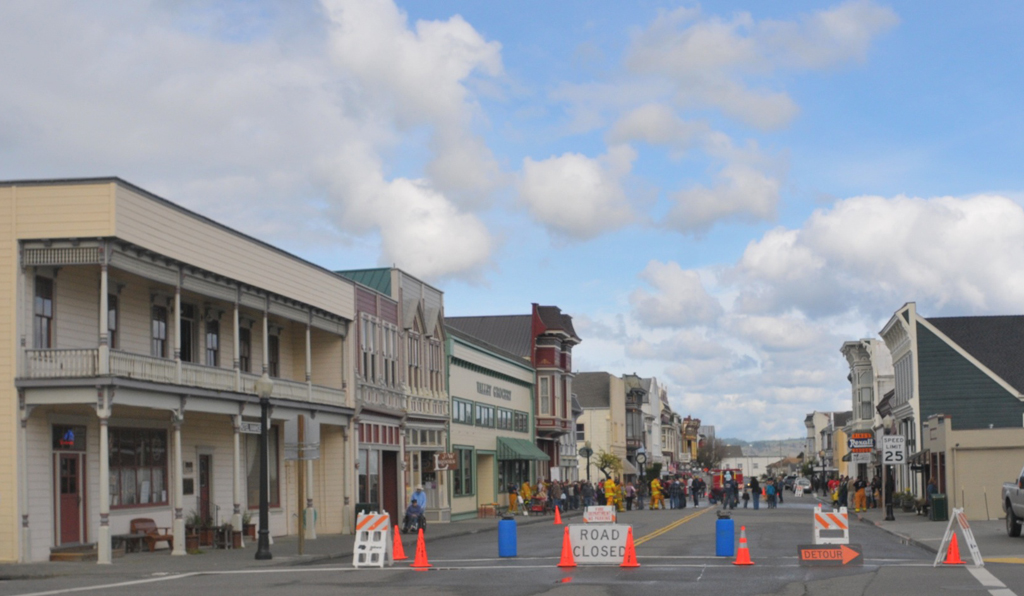
- Ferndale's Historic Main Street view to north at Ocean Avenue.
- Location: 300–580 Main Street, 330 Ocean Avenue and 207–290 Francis Street. Ferndale, California
- Coordinates: 40°34′35.79″N 124°15′49.46″W
- Architect: includes T.J. Frost
- Architectural style: Italianate, Stick/Eastlake, Queen Anne commercial and mixed use buildings
- NRHP reference No.: 93001461
- Added to NRHP: January 10, 1994

A portion of the City of Ferndale (California) was designated a State Historic Landmark (No. 883) in 1975 by the California State Parks Office of Historic Preservation. Ferndale's Main Street Historic District was established in 1994 by the National Park Service and placed on the National Register of Historic Places.

== Architecture ==
Two distinct architectural phases are represented: late 19th century Victorian architecture, 1880 to 1890 and the early Modern period of the 20th century, 1920 to 1936. Eastlake-Stick style buildings by Architect T.J. Frost are particularly well represented as are Italianate, Queen Anne, Neo-Classic, Bungalow, and Mission styles.

The Ferndale Main Street Historic District covers 46 acres, includes 39 contributing buildings and one object, the Town Clock.

.	Name	Image	Date built	Location	Summary
1	Alford House		1884	207 Francis St.	Cottage built for Dr. Alford in 1884.
2	Masonic Temple		1891	212 Francis St.	Eastlake-Stick architecture.
3	Enterprise Office		1891	219 Francis St.	Currently residential.
4	Faulkner House		1899	230 Francis St.	Built for Thomas H. Faulkner.
5	Faulkner Building		1881	248–250 Francis St.	Commercial false-front.
6	Russ Bank Building		1891	290 Francis St. and 400 Ocean Ave.	Eastlake-Stick – T.J. Frost, Architect
7	Robert's Hotel/Ferndale Hotel		1875	315 Main St.	Currently Ivanhoe Hotel. Oldest building in historic district.
8	Taylor Building		1898	325–327 Main St.	The red building on left is part of the Taylor building which has housed the Post Office and a drug store.
9	Enterprise Building		1923	334 Main St.	Concrete moderne.
10	Post Office/ Drug Store Building		1889	337 Main St.	The grey part of the Taylor building at right has been the Post Office and a drug store.
11	Palace Saloon (M.H. Donnelly Building)		1902	341–353 Main St.	The Palace Saloon is the westernmost saloon in the conterminous 48 U.S. states.
12	Loewenthal's Ferndale Reliable Store		344 Main St.	Eastlake-Stick – T. J. Frost, Architect.	
13	Brown's Office Building		1902	350 Main St.	Built as T.H. Brown's Office Building by putting up what is known as a Victorian False-front in 1902.
14	Rose Mullady's Millinery & Art Needlework Store		1928	358 Main St.	Modernistic building with added Victorian ornament.
15	D. A. Branstetter Building		1902	361 Main St.	Victorian False-front.
16	Ring's Pharmacy		1896	362 Main St.	Eastlake-Stick – T.J. Frost, Architect
17	Russ & Sons Meat Market		1900	376 Main St.	Eastlake-Stick – T.J. Frost, Architect.
18	Town Clock		1923	385 Main St.	In front of Dan A. Branstetter building.
19	P.F. Hart Building		1896	393 Main St.	Former gallery of Hobart Brown.
20	Ferndale Bank		1911	394 Main St.	Neo-Classical – operated as a bank until 2022 (now a retail store).
21	New Hart Building		1924	399–405 Main St.	Mission Revival Style.
22	Alford's Drug Store/Michel Drug Store		1877	409 Main St.	Italianate storefront.
23	Mullady Building		1894	424 Main St.	Victorian False-front built for James Mullady.
24	Masonic-Odd Fellows Hall		1875	425–431 Main St.	Victorian False-front.
25	Meng Building		1891	430–436 Main St.	Victorian False-front.
26	Hart Theatre		1920	441–451 Main St.	F. Georgeson, Architect, currently Ferndale Repertory Theatre.
27	Gill House/Blackburn Building		1876	444 Main St.	Victorian False-front.
28	Grangreen-Ward-Gill House		1870	452 Main St.	1870 residence joined to a 1918 storefront.
29	G. W. Williams Building		1888	455 Main St.	Modified in 1920, 1948, and 1954. Upper floor subsequently rebuilt and restored by Ferndale Blacksmith Company.
30	Eel River & Southern Telephone Company Building		1924	460 Main St.	Mission Revival.
31	Dahlquist Plumbing & Electrical Shop		1936	468 Main St.	Eastlake-Stick style – T.J. Frost, Architect.
32	Gill Building/Hiller Building		1891	476 Main St.	Victorian False-front.
33	Paine Building		1901	484 Main St.	Queen Anne Style built for S.H. Paine.
34	Old Red Front Store		1900	505 Main St.	Italianate (modified late 1940s).
35	Kemp Building		1930	513–525 Main St.	Mission Revival.
36	Petersen's Service Station		1930	524 Main St.	Modernistic/Streamline Moderne
37	R. H. Edwards Building		1901	535 Main St.	Victorian False-front.
38	Hiram Hatch Building		1901	543 Main St.	Victorian False-front.
39	Charles A. Doe Building		1901	561–563 Main St.	Neo-Classical.
40	S&E Garage and Ford Dealership		1927	580 Main St.	Modernistic False-front.

Six other Historic Landmarks, the Shaw House, the Berding House, the Catholic Church of the Assumption Rectory, Ferndale Public Library and the Alford-Nielson House are within the city limits. The Fern Cottage Historic District and F. W. Andreasen–John Rossen House are slightly out of town.

== Popular culture ==
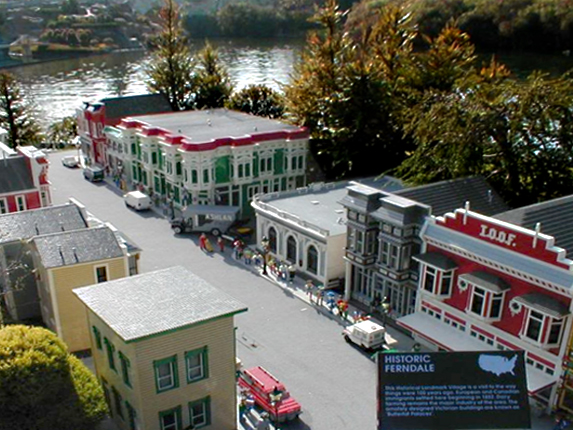
Some of Ferndale's historic buildings at Legoland, California. Left to right top: Abraxas Building, Victorian Inn, NVB Bank Building, Hobart Galleries, and the IOOF hall. The order of the buildings is not the same in reality.

=== Legoland Model Replica ===
Many of Ferndale's buildings have been recreated at the Legoland California theme park – the only American small town represented alongside New York, San Francisco, Las Vegas and other nationally known locations. Ferndale was settled by many Danes, and Lego is a Danish company. In 1995, Legoland staff took hundreds of photos in Ferndale, and used over 1 million Lego bricks to recreate the town in the Miniland section of the park.

=== Films and Movies ===
Ferndale's historic Main Street has been shown in television and movies since the 1960s. The street is featured in movies like The Majestic, Outbreak, Salem's Lot and A Death in Canaan.
