= Fusakichi Omori =

Japanese seismologist

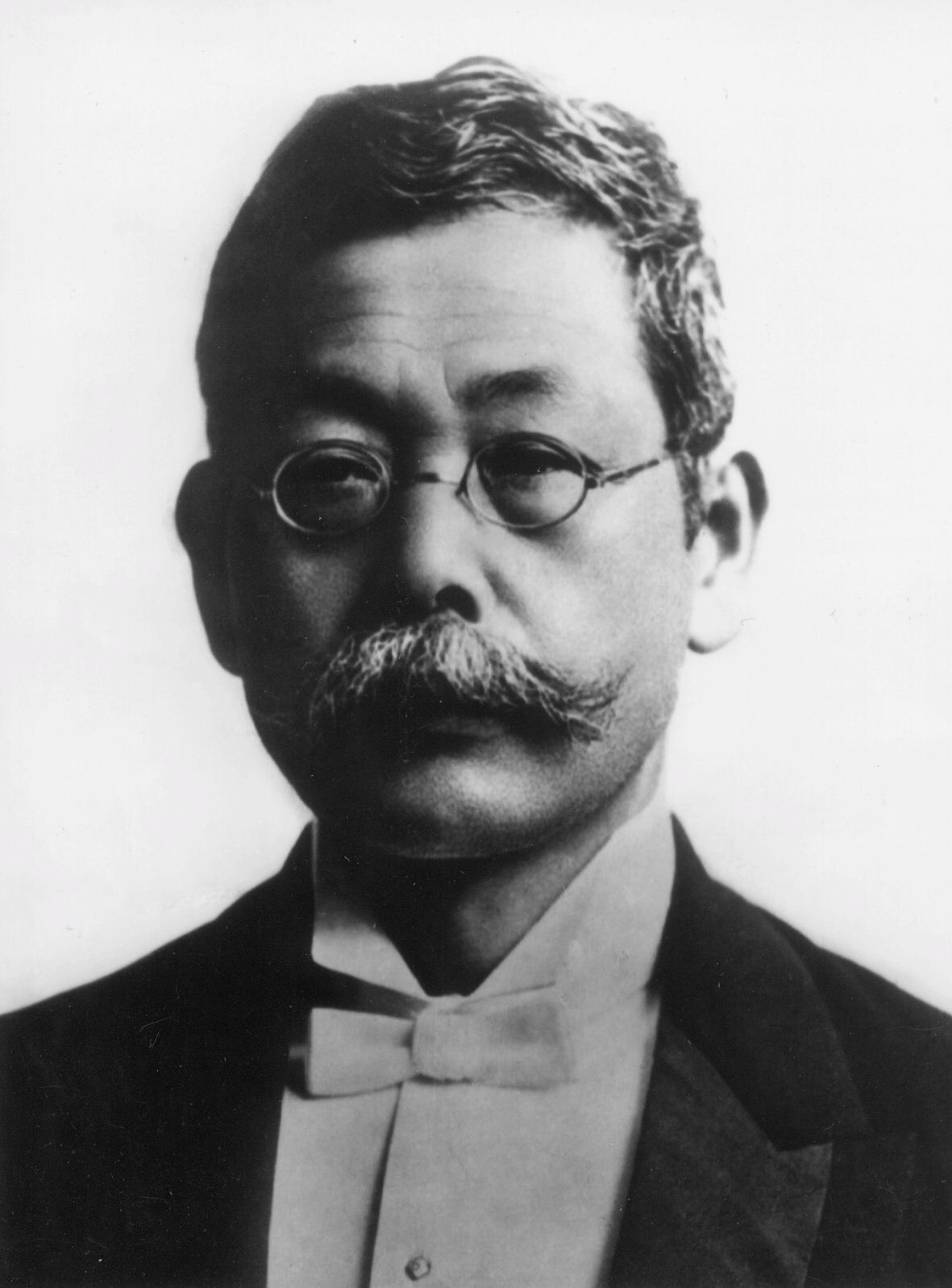
- Fusakichi Omori
- Born: 30 October 1868; Fukui, Japan
- Died: 8 November 1923 (aged 55); Tokyo, Japan
- Education: Tokyo Imperial University
- Occupation: Scientist
- Known for: pioneer seismologist
- Awards: Order of the Sacred Treasure from the Imperial Court of Japan

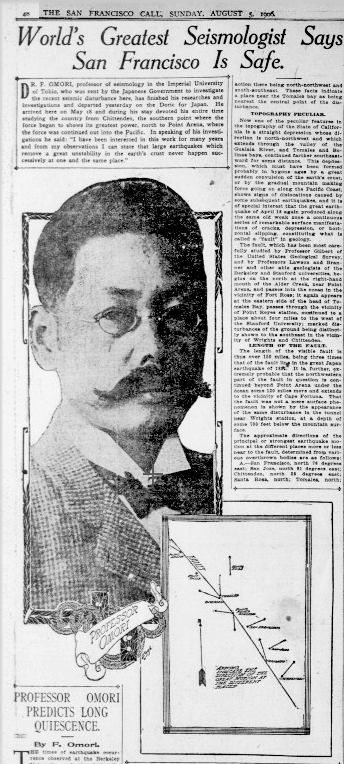
Fusakichi Omori

Fusakichi Omori (大森 房吉, Ōmori Fusakichi; 30 October 1868 – 8 November 1923) was a pioneer Japanese seismologist, second chairman of seismology at Tokyo Imperial University and president of the Japanese Imperial Earthquake Investigation Committee. Omori is also known for his observation describing the aftershock rate of earthquakes, now known as Omori's law.

== Education ==
Omori studied physics with the initial British foreign advisors serving as professors at the Imperial University of Tokyo, especially John Milne until he left Japan in 1895, as well as Japanese colleagues including Seikei Sekiya who in 1880 became the first professor of seismology at Tokyo Imperial University.

== Early career ==
Sekiya and Omori published the first clear record of a destructive earthquake, obtained by their measuring devices at the university. In 1886 Sekiya was made chair of seismology and secretary to the Imperial Earthquake Investigation Committee and by the time of his death a decade later, Japan had nearly 1000 seismological recording stations to study seismicity in Japan.

In 1891 Omori was appointed assistant to Sekiya and in 1893 lecturer on seismology at the Imperial University. In 1895, he was sent to Germany and Italy for additional study and visited England briefly on his way home in September 1896.

Omori became chair of seismology at the university and secretary of the Imperial Earthquake Investigation Committee following Sekya's death on 9 January 1896. He could read English, German, Italian and Japanese and maintained correspondence with many seismologists as well as writing papers in all four languages.

== Recording seismographs ==
In 1899, Omori described his horizontal recording pendulum, later called an Omori seismometer and with minor modifications by the J&A Bosch Company of Strassburg, the "Bosch-Omori Seismometer". Distributed worldwide, Bosch-Omori seismographs formed the backbone of the world seismographic network until after World War II. The last two operating Bosch-Omori seismographs, now operating independently of the seismographic network, are exhibited at the Ferndale Museum (California) and at The Loomis Museum in Lassen Volcanic National Park (California).

== Global earthquake investigations ==
On 28 October 1891 Mino and Owari provinces were devastated by earthquakes; their fault lines were traced by Bunjiro Koto (1856–1935), another professor at Imperial University. He found the strike-slip fault cut the surface for at least 40 miles and that the north-east side had shifted relative to the other side a distance of one to two meters. Some areas had 18 to 20 foot high scarps, others looked like a linear mole had been at work. This earthquake provided an initial data set which, when correlated with other earthquakes, revealed that aftershock frequency decreases by approximately the reciprocal of time after the main shock, a mathematical formula now called "Omori's law".

Omori conducted measurements of the three principal phases of earthquake motion originally described by Milne: the preliminary tremors, the main portion and the end portion, and visited areas after major earthquakes to ground verify the data collected by his instruments. Omori arrived in Japanese Formosa (Taiwan) shortly after the 17 March 1906 Meishan earthquake, later describing soil liquefaction and the complete destruction of Meishan town. He ascribed the high number of casualties due to structure collapse of the dominant local building type: sun-dried brick walls loosely cemented with mud and overlaid by heavy roof beams.

Previously, in 1889 Omori had worked with John Milne to record experiments carried out at the Engineering college at the University of Tokyo to investigate the overturning and fracturing of brick and other columns by horizontally applied motion. For many years the modernization of Japan during the Meiji Restoration, through replacement of traditional light wooden structures resting on boulders, with red brick buildings and iron bridges, had been a major source of concern or Milne.

Omori later continued this research and is recognized in earthquake engineering as the first to research the effects of earthquakes on man-made structures through implementing the usage of shaking tables and comparing experimental results with measurements during actual earthquakes.

At the 1908 Messina earthquake, Omori noted the large loss of life, perhaps 75,000 and said that of those 99 percent had died because their houses were not built to withstand earthquakes.

== San Francisco earthquake 1906 ==
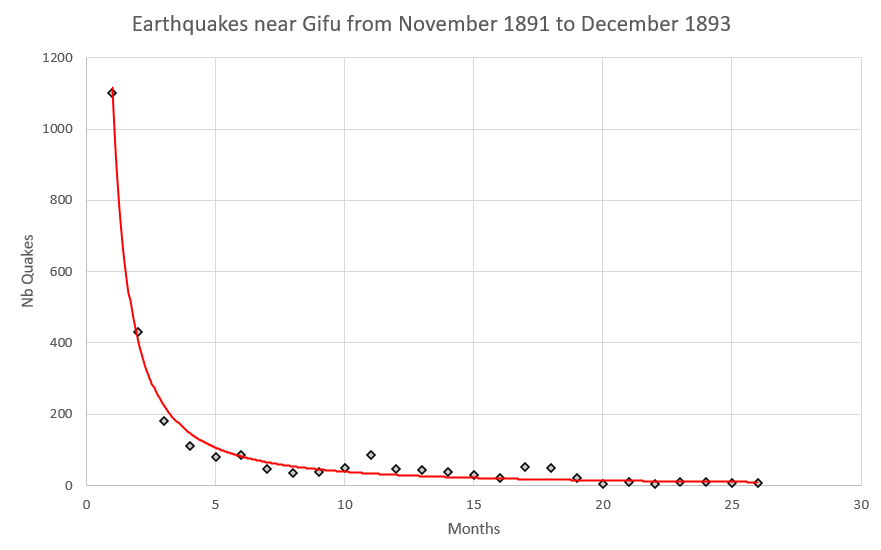
Omori's Law as defined based on aftershocks of the 1891 Mino–Owari earthquake (Japan).

Worldwide, the two most common types of seismographs at the time, the Milne-type and Bosch-Omori seismographs recorded the San Francisco earthquake. Seismologists from around the world arrived in northern California shortly after the disaster.

Omori left Tokyo 1 May by ship and arrived in San Francisco 18 May at the head of an Imperial committee of architects and engineers including Professors Tatsutaro Nakamura and Toshikata ("Riki") Sano to study the aftermath of the San Francisco earthquake and to give a new seismograph to the University of California. Another member of the committee was an architect, Magoichi Noguchi.

Omori and his colleagues spent time in the city measuring damaged buildings and taking photographs. They were reportedly assaulted on more than one occasion. At least two authors state that Omori and colleagues were attacked on Mission Street, San Francisco by a gang of men and youths who were later hailed by the local press for their anti-Japanese racist stoning and slugging of random Japanese men, however contemporary sources indicate that one boy involved in the stoning of Dr. Omori worked for the Post Office as a messenger was fired by Postmaster Fisk of San Francisco when the Japanese Association of America protested. Other incidents alleged in a letter to the newspaper are unreferenced by any other sources, and Omori himself chose to forgive writing, "referring to some trouble I had with hoodlums in San Francisco. I was very glad to see that the people of Hawaii did not like to have me treated in that way, but then it did me no injury and I bear no malice. There are hoodlums in all countries. The people of California treated me extremely well and I am very much pleased with my trip."

During the approximately 80 days spent in California, Omori traveled by steamer as far north as Humboldt County, California where on 6 July 1906 he was struck by a ruffian who mistook him for a non-union strikebreaking sailor in Eureka, California and the mayor of Eureka promptly apologized to Dr. Omori.

Omori continued his observations south into the Eel River Valley, stopped in Ferndale, California and noted a giant landslide south of Centerville at False Cape which covered the former coast road and created a new promontory into the Pacific Ocean as well as damage to local property and buildings. Leaving Ferndale, Omori continued a careful inventory of man-made and natural features as he followed the trace of the San Andreas Fault south to San Francisco by land. Along the way he noticed the reaction of ground, buildings and trees to the earthquake, noting that "even large redwoods trees were split by the shearing motion of the ground."

Later, Omori, the University of California (Berkeley), and the United States Coast and Geodetic Survey establishing a Ferndale Seismographic Station that would support the installation of a Bosch-Omori Seismograph in Ferndale. The area is especially interesting due to its proximity to the Mendocino triple junction offshore. That seismograph continues to operate (now independently) and is exhibited at the Ferndale Museum.

In person, and in his writings, Omori followed the visible land trace of the fault 150 miles south to San Jose from Point Arena, but pointed out that the line continued 120 miles northward, underwater to the False Cape landslide south of Eureka, California. Many of Omori's photographs from this trip were published.

Omori studied the directions of the movement by studying tombstones south of San Francisco, and cracks in the walls of buildings including the St. James Hotel in San Jose. Correlating damage in Western and Japanese construction, Omori released the first scale of earthquake damage that used instrument readings as well as observed effects to describe damage. Omori described the faulting in California as parallel to the strike of the fault caused by shear stresses on the plane of fracture. Omori seismographs were rapidly installed all over northern California, and a list of aftershocks to the San Francisco earthquake was compiled and published. Omori returned to Japan 4 August 1906 aboard the Doric.

== Volcanic seismicity ==
From one of his earliest papers describing the eruption of Mount Azuma in 1893 to his death, Omori studied Japanese volcanos. He described several types of volcanic earthquakes from data obtained at regular eruptions of Mount Asama in central Japan, the 1910 Mount Usu eruption and the 12 January 1914 eruption of Sakurajima. At the latter two eruptions, his warnings to the population prevented greater loss of life.

After meeting Thomas Jaggar of the Massachusetts Institute of Technology who was planning a volcanic observatory on the Big Island of Hawaii, Omori designed the foundations and seismograph emplacement for the Whitney Laboratory of Seismology, building 29 near Volcano House, now part of the Hawaiian Volcano Observatory, state historic site 10-52-5506 and National Register of Historic Places site 74000292, added 24 July 1974. In 1912 Omori shipped to Hawaii two instruments, an Omori-type Horizontal Tromometer and a seismograph, to be placed on the specially built foundations. A year later, two more Bosch-Omori seismographs were donated to the HVO by the Massachusetts Institute of Technology.

== Final conference ==
In fall 1923 Omori attended the Second Pan-Pacific Science Congress in Australia, where he and Edward Pigot, the director of the observatory at Riverview College in Sydney, Australia observed a seismograph recording the major great Kantō earthquake which destroyed Yokohama and Tokyo on 1 September 1923, killing about 140,000 and leaving 1.9 million people homeless.

Omori returned to Japan from Melbourne, Australia on board the Tenyo Maru on 4 October 1923. Shortly thereafter, he was diagnosed with a brain tumor and entered the university hospital where he received the Order of the Sacred Treasure from the Imperial Court a few days before his death at age 55 on 8 November 1923.
