= Shaw House (Ferndale, California) =

Historic house in California, United States

- U.S. National Register of Historic Places
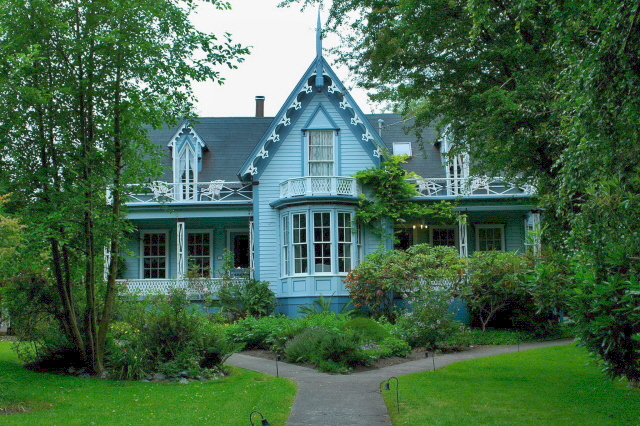
- Front facade

- Location within California Location within the United States
- Location: 703 Main St., Ferndale, California
- Coordinates: 40°34′45″N 124°15′39″W
- Area: 1.1 acres (0.45 ha)
- Built: 1854
- Architect: Seth Shaw
- Architectural style: Gothic Revival, Carpenter Gothic
- NRHP reference No.: 84000777
- Added to NRHP: September 13, 1984

The Shaw House, also known as the Shaw House Inn, is a historic Carpenter Gothic Victorian style house located at 703 Main Street in Ferndale, Humboldt County, California. It served historically as a courthouse, a post office, and a single-family dwelling.

== History ==
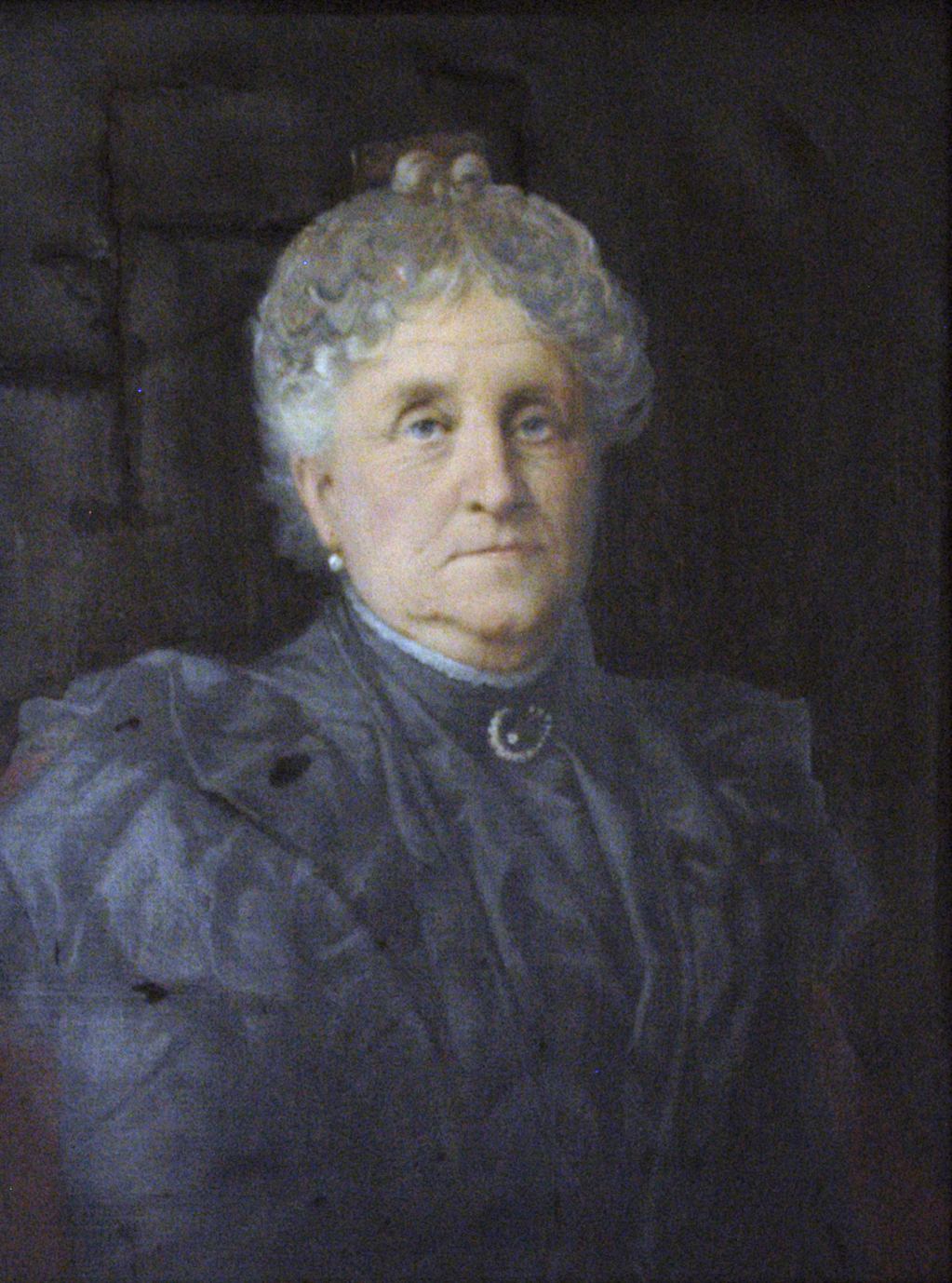
Isabella Shaw, painted by her brother-in-law, Stephen William Shaw, now exhibited at the Ferndale Museum.

The Shaw House was built in 1854 by Seth Shaw, who with his brother Stephen W. Shaw had arrived by canoe in 1852 to build a cabin, clear some land, claim it and found the town of Ferndale. Despite long-standing local legend, the house was not inspired by Nathaniel Hawthorne's House of the Seven Gables, but rather by the home of Mariano Guadalupe Vallejo, now known as the Vallejo Estate, in Sonoma, California which had been drawn and painted by Stephen W. Shaw. In the early days, the Shaw House served as the area's first courthouse as well as post office.

The building was owned by the family, vacant for several years at the end, until sold in 1967. Fully restored by two owners, the Shaw House was added to the National Register of Historic Places on September 13, 1984.

It remains the oldest house in Ferndale and functions as a bed and breakfast under the Shaw House Inn name. It still features the marble fireplace that Isabella Shaw, Seth's bride, chose from Gump's department store in San Francisco, California.
