= Alford–Nielson House =

Historic house in California, United States

- U.S. National Register of Historic Places
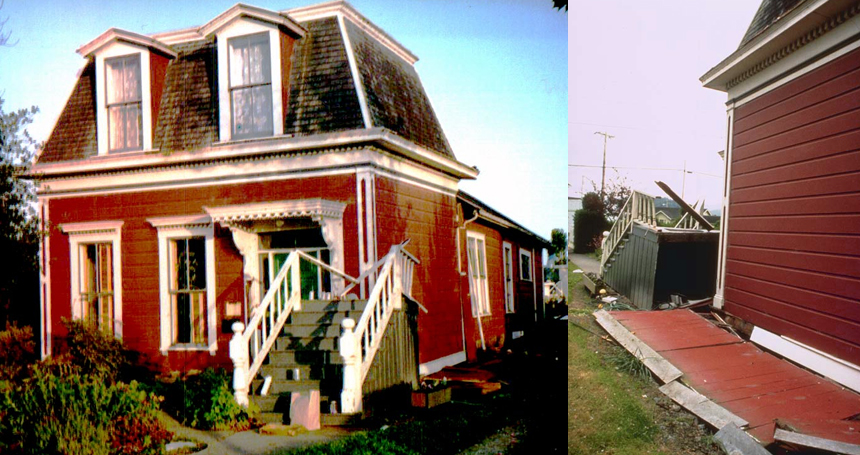
- This historic home was thrown to the ground in the 1992 Cape Mendocino Earthquakes. It was later restored.

- Location within California Location within the United States
- Location: 1299 Main Street, Ferndale, California
- Coordinates: 40°34′45″N 124°15′38″W
- Built: 1875–1899
- Built by: James E. Brown
- Architectural style: Second Empire French Style
- NRHP reference No.: 86000100
- Added to NRHP: 23 January 1986

The Alford–Nielson Home, is the only example of Second Empire French Victorian Architecture in Ferndale, Humboldt County, California.

== History ==
In 1874, James E. Brown built what is now the back part of this house at a different location, 421 Main Street, in the current Main Street historical district.

William B. Alford (1851–1921), a local pharmacist after whom the house is named, arrived in Humboldt County at age 21 in 1872 and moved to Ferndale in 1875 where he jointly owned a drugstore with his brother Frank A. Alford, M.D. immediately adjoining the former location of this house in the Main Street commercial district.

Dr. Alford married Mary Richmond in San Jose, California in 1877; the Second Empire French Style front building was added in the same year.

In June 1893, the property was purchased by furniture dealer H. J. Mueller (1864–1900) who moved the house with the Alford family in residence to 1299 Main Street. Six months later, the Alfords moved out and the Mueller family moved in. The Muellers built an addition to the house in February 1896. The house and furnishings were purchased by Ed Mowry in August, 1903 and the Muellers moved to Livermore, California.

The next owner, Maurice Nielson, lived there fifty-five years to 1977. He was one of the developers of modern creamery operations in Humboldt County. Neilson was followed by a couple who started and finished a seven-year restoration then sold the house to Tom and Maura Eastman who filed for the home to be added to the National Register of Historic Places. It was accepted at 112 years of age on 23 January 1986.

The home sustained significant damage and fell off its footing in the 1992 Cape Mendocino earthquakes, but was restored.
