= Afterslip =

Type of motion along a fault

An afterslip is a slipping motion along a fault that occurs over months to years, after an earthquake. Afterslips can either take place as a gradual movement (slow-sip) that doesn't create enough energy to set out seismic waves, or as an earthquake.

== See also ==
- Aftershock
