= 1992 Cape Mendocino earthquakes =

- UTC time: 1992-04-25 18:06:06
- ISC event: 297295
- USGS-ANSS: ComCat
- Local date: April 25, 1992; 34 years ago
- Local time: 11:06:06 PDT
- Duration: 9 seconds
- Magnitude: 7.2 M_{w}
- Depth: 10.5 km (7 mi)
- Epicenter: 40.33°N 124.23°W
- Areas affected: North Coast (California); United States
- Total damage: $48.3–75 million
- Max. intensity: MMI IX (Violent)
- Peak acceleration: 2.2 g (est)
- Tsunami: Yes
- Aftershocks: 6.5 M_{w} April 26 at 0:41; 6.6 M_{w} April 26 at 4:18
- Casualties: 98–356 injuries

The 1992 Cape Mendocino earthquakes (or 1992 Petrolia earthquakes) occurred along the Lost Coast of Northern California on April 25 and 26. The three largest events were the M7.2 thrust mainshock that struck near the unincorporated community of Petrolia midday on April 25 and two primary strike-slip aftershocks measuring 6.5 and 6.6 that followed early the next morning. The sequence encompassed both interplate and intraplate activity that was associated with the Mendocino triple junction, a complex system of three major faults (including the Cascadia subduction zone, San Andreas Fault, and Mendocino fracture zone) that converge near Cape Mendocino. The total number of aftershocks that followed the events exceeded 2,000.

The three shocks damaged and destroyed homes and businesses in Humboldt County and injured up to 356 people, but the single largest loss was due to a post-earthquake fire that consumed a business center in Scotia. Accelerometers that had been in place in the Cape Mendocino area since the late 1970s recorded the event and the readings were moderate to strong, with the exception of the instruments closest to the epicenter, which went off scale a few seconds into the recording. No surface ruptures were present in the epicentral area, but landslides closed roads and railroad tracks for at least a week while cleanup took place. Coastal uplift near Cape Mendocino and Punta Gorda was measured at 1 m (3 ft 3 in).

As the largest earthquake in California since the 1989 Loma Prieta event, the mainshock caused a non-destructive tsunami that quickly reached the coast, and eventually Alaska and Hawaii several hours later. The tsunami was noteworthy not for its run-up, but for the varying speeds in which it reached points along the coast and for how long the waves persisted.

Other strong earthquakes have affected the same area, with some that were clearly associated with the (interplate) Mendocino fracture zone, and others (like the two shocks on April 26) were intraplate earthquakes that ruptured within the Gorda plate, but events that are unequivocally associated with the Cascadia subduction zone are relatively less frequent.

== Tectonic setting ==
The northernmost coastal area is one of California's most seismically active regions and, in a 50-year period, the area including the Mendocino fracture zone at the southern flank of the Gorda plate generated about 25 percent of all seismic energy unleashed in the state. The Mendocino triple junction (strike-slip/strike-slip/trench) formed 29–30 mya at 31° N (west of present-day Baja California) when the Pacific-Farallon spreading center initially approached the subduction zone off the coast of western North America. Simultaneously, the Rivera triple junction shifted to the southeast to its current position at 23° N. Once the Pacific plate and North American plate connected, the boundary became that of a transform fault (San Andreas) due to the northwestward motion of the Pacific plate relative to the North American plate. The San Andreas Fault continues to lengthen to the northwest and the southeast as the two triple junctions continue their transient motion.

North of the Mendocino triple junction, the Gorda plate is subducting beneath the North American plate at the Cascadia subduction zone, with a convergence rate of 2.5–3 centimeters (0.98–1.18 in) per year, but comparisons with other subduction zones have led to a belief that the convergence may be taking place aseismically. The distinct lack of interplate events there has generated contention regarding the zone's seismic hazard, though there are strong indications that substantial historic events have occurred in the Pacific Northwest. Submerged wetlands and raised marine terraces both illustrate the presence of past events, and radiocarbon dating of rock layers has revealed that three seismic events took place in the last 2,000 years, with the most recent event being the 1700 Cascadia earthquake. The Gorda plate is undergoing a process of intraplate deformation and experiences large intraplate earthquakes that may be the result of north–south compression of the oceanic crust along the Mendocino fracture zone.

== Earthquakes ==
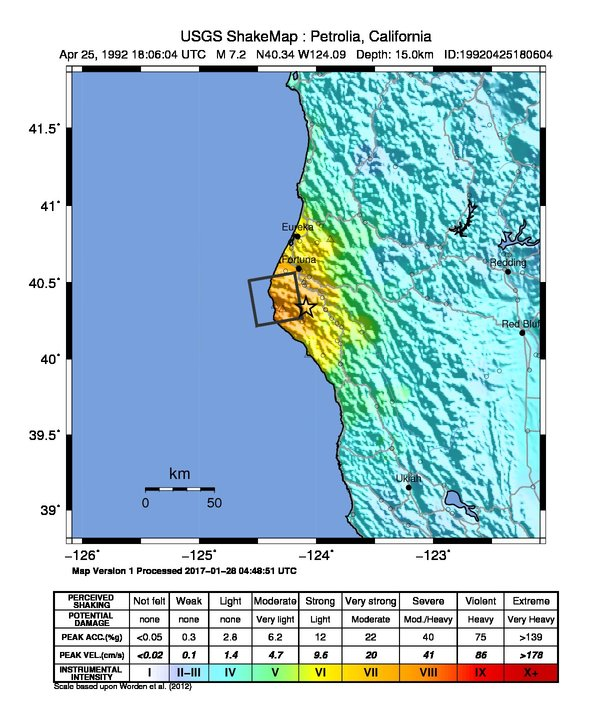
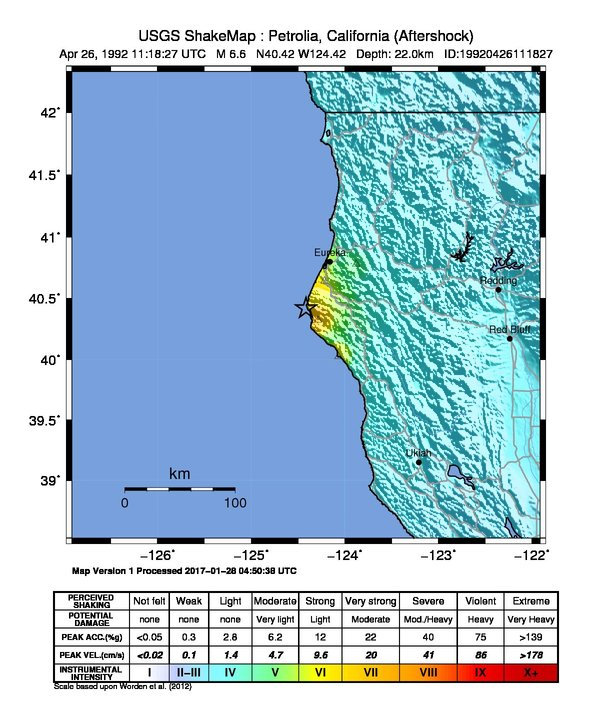
USGS ShakeMaps showing the mainshock (left) and the second (and slightly stronger) 4:18 PDT aftershock's intensity

The region near the triple junction experiences high seismicity, with more than 60 earthquakes of intensity VI (Strong) or greater or magnitudes ≥ 5.5 since 1853. The mainshock in the sequence (11:06 a.m. Pacific Daylight Time) occurred onshore, 4 kilometers (2.5 mi) west of Petrolia at a depth of 10.5 kilometers, and was among an infrequent number of earthquakes with fault-plane solutions that conveyed evidence of slip at the Cascadia subduction zone. While the focal mechanism indicated slip on a thrust fault striking N.10°W with a shallow dip of 13° to the east-northeast, the rupture most likely propagated to the west, based on the mainshock location at the southeastern boundary of the aftershock zone. Investigation of more than 1,200 surveys from the North Coast area led to the assignment of an intensity rating of IX (Violent) on the Modified Mercalli scale for the region near Petrolia.

In opposition to the mainshock that was located onshore, the two large strike-slip aftershocks occurred the following morning (12:41 a.m. and 4:18 a.m. PDT) and were located offshore, 30 km (19 mi) to the west of the main shock within the Gorda plate. Both shocks (M6.5 and 6.6) were of intensity VIII (Severe), occurred at a depth of 20 kilometers (12 mi), and exhibited right-lateral motion. Of the several thousand aftershocks in the sequence, none were found to have occurred on the Mendocino fracture zone, but numerous events were located on the eastward projection of that fault. The mainshock's rupture duration was described as a smooth nine seconds, while the two aftershocks had more complex and slightly longer ruptures of 14–15 seconds. That the two strike-slip events followed a thrust event indicated a strong coupling of stresses at the North American and Gorda plate boundaries, and underscored the convoluted nature of the interconnected faults in that area.

=== Damage ===
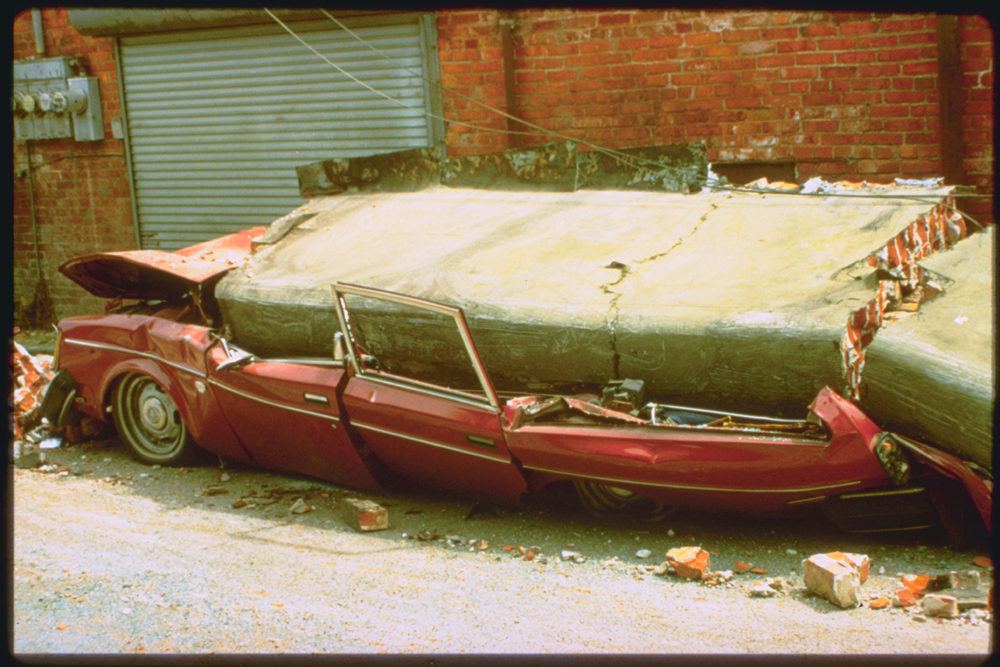
Cars crushed by a fallen brick facade in Ferndale, California

The initial event caused a number of wood-framed homes in Scotia to come off their foundations while the porches of some other homes became detached. The 25 MW cogeneration plant there that used wood waste products to power both the lumber company and the town suffered damage and both lumber mills were shut down for several weeks. In Rio Dell, across the Eel River from Scotia, glass store fronts along the main street were shattered and numerous buildings slipped into a culvert along Monument Road. In Petrolia (the small community closest to the epicenter) the general store (combined with a post office and gas station) was destroyed by fire, and in Fortuna, damage totaled $4 million. A six figure portion of that figure was due to losses at the high school's gymnasium.

The two aftershocks the following morning were separated by less than four hours and both caused at least as much damage as the mainshock. A large fire was triggered following the first aftershock at a shopping center in Scotia that destroyed four businesses, with the resulting damage at that site alone estimated at $15 million, and was the largest individual financial misfortune of the sequence of earthquakes. The water supply in Rio Dell was terminated when the water main was severed at the abutment to the Eel River bridge and power outages were widespread throughout Humboldt County. Some were mere seconds while others lasted for hours, but the hydroelectric plant's performance at Ruth Reservoir was deemed acceptable, and power that was not generated locally was unaffected.

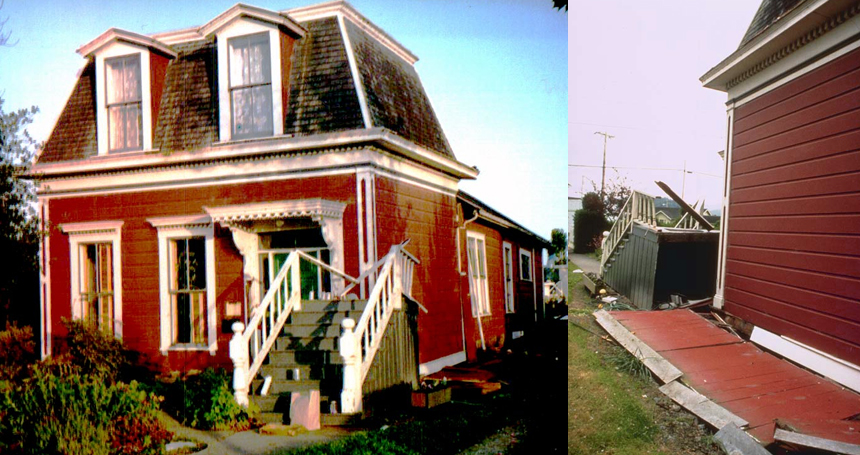
The Alford-Nielson House in Ferndale fell off its foundation in the quake (O'Brien 1993, p. 81). It was later restored.

Damage estimates were as high as $75 million, one third of which was due to bridges and roads, and the remainder of the costs were structure-related. The American Red Cross compiled damage statistics in the county and the totals included 906 damaged homes and apartments. Almost half of those were severely damaged and an additional 200 homes were destroyed. In Petrolia, the post office, three businesses, and 44 homes were destroyed, and another 68 residences were damaged. In Ferndale, 29 homes were knocked off their foundations and 126 were damaged, along with 51 businesses. In Rio Dell, 127 buildings were damaged or destroyed. With 98 homes and 41 businesses experiencing some form of damage, the city of Fortuna experienced losses totaling $3.8 million. Eureka and Arcata (25 miles (40 km) north of the Eel River valley) saw light damage and no injuries, while the unincorporated communities of Weott and Carlotta reported damage of less than $2 million combined.

=== Strong motion ===
As the largest earthquake in California since the October 1989 event in the Santa Cruz Mountains, the mainshock near Petrolia produced some of the highest ground motions ever recorded (at that time) by the California Strong Motion Instrumentation Program (CSMIP). Fourteen existing CSMIP stations comprising 84 strong motion sensors recorded the event, ten of which were ground response stations. The remaining four were located on structures, including a Highway 101 overpass in Rio Dell, a dam, a one-story supermarket in Fortuna, and a 5-story residential building in Eureka. The supermarket, residential building, and dam were 28, 50, and 75 kilometers distant from the epicenter respectively, and recorded peak accelerations of 0.46 g, 0.34 g, and 0.15 g. An accelerograph at the Painter Street overpass (a concrete bridge, 24 km (15 mi) from the epicenter) recorded a free field acceleration of 0.55 g and an instrument on the structure saw an amplified peak of 1.23 g during the mainshock.

The CSMIP Cape Mendocino station was installed in 1978 and was located just 4 kilometers (2.5 mi) from the epicenter on the slope of a ridge in the coast ranges. The instruments there had been mounted on a concrete platform adjacent to a roadway and remained firmly secured to the rock platform following the shocks. A landslide came within 50 meters (160 ft) of the device and left debris on the road, but a lack of large rocks close to the instrument and no cracking of the rocks near the platform left geologists with no clear explanation for the extraordinarily high vertical component reading of 1.85 g. The tri-axial analog accelerometer that was in use was physically limited to that value and all three traces had uniformly significant values at three seconds into the recording. A post-earthquake lab test of the seismometer and an inspection of the photographically enlarged accelerogram revealed that the limit was hit twice, with a maximum deflection of 31 mm, as the needle bounced off the unit's mass. An extrapolation of the vertical record led to a maximum acceleration estimate of 2.2 g for that site, and the unit was eventually replaced with a higher capacity digital device.

=== Ground effects ===
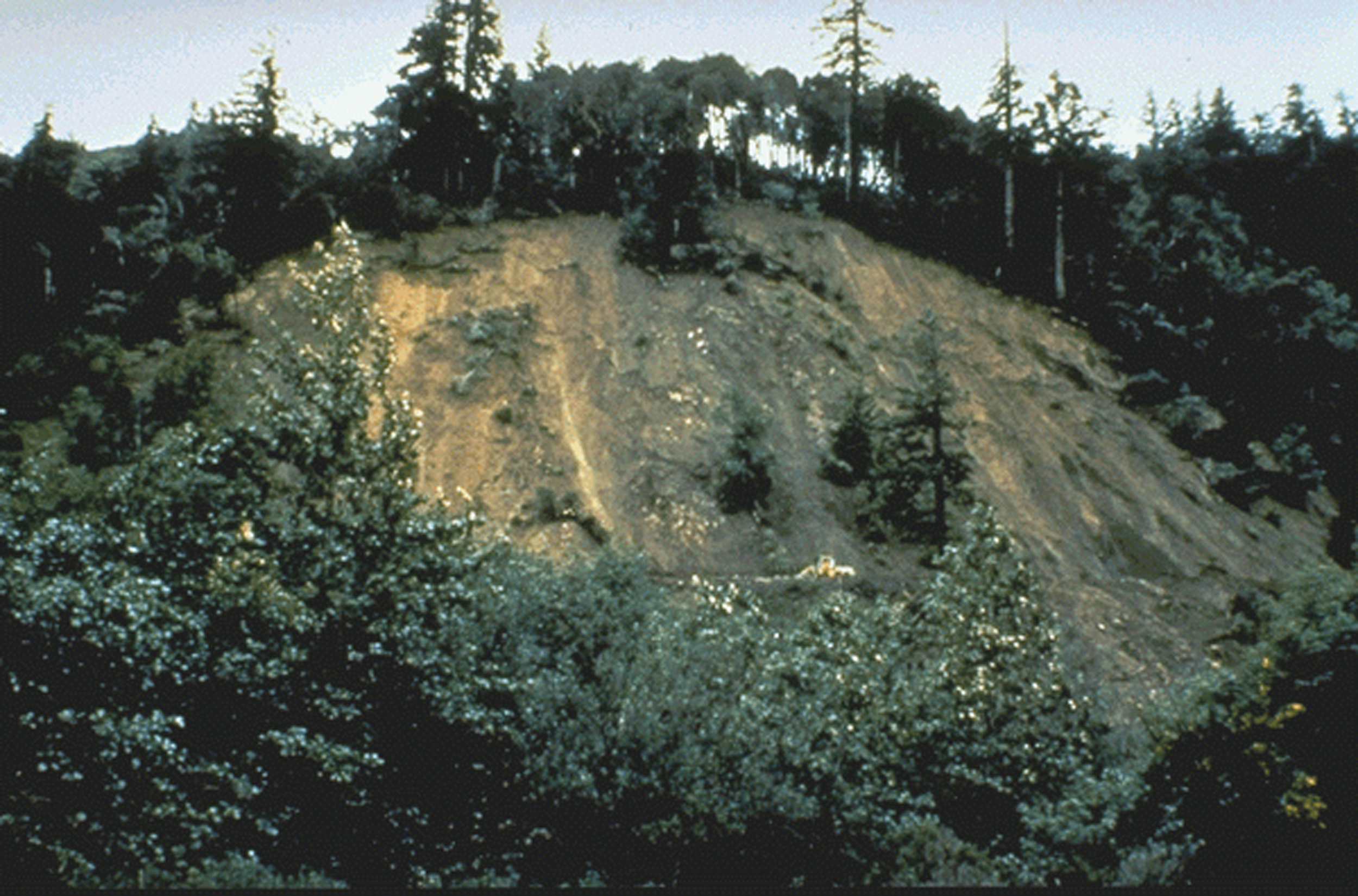
A landslide west of Ferndale

The sequence of earthquakes caused widespread landslides from the coast to east of Scotia and from the northern extent of the Eel River basin near Thompson Hill to south of Petrolia. Most of these were existing landslides that had been re-initiated and the largest of the slides were either slumps or bedding plane failures along the coastal bluffs. Several slump failures between Guthrie Creek and Oil Creek stretched from the bluffs towards the shore for a distance of 150 meters (490 ft), leaving some of the slide to be eroded by the surf. The road between Ferndale and Petrolia was closed for more than a week where about six mostly minor landslides blocked the passage, with the roadway itself sustaining light damage due to sliding or settlement of the road fill in a few instances. One of the largest slides occurred along the railroad tracks at the Scotia bluffs where previous slides had taken place. That slide also took about a week to clear.

During a survey following the earthquake, evidence of coastal uplift was detected when dead and decomposing intertidal organisms were discovered along the beaches in the epicentral region. Further investigation revealed that a 15 km (9.3 mi) portion of the shoreline between Cape Mendocino and near Punta Gorda had been uplifted by as much as 1 m (3 ft 3 in) near the middle portion, and decreasing amounts near the outer portions of the affected area. Evidence of previous events has been found in the form of sequential marine terraces along the coast, with periodic events creating shelves at 300, 1,700, 3,000, and 5,000 years before present. No surface ruptures were found during aerial surveillance, but lateral spreading features were observed on a channel near the mouth of the Eel River.

== Tsunami ==
The mainshock generated a small tsunami that was recorded by the National Oceanic and Atmospheric Administration's sea level gauge stations on the coasts of northern California, Oregon, and Hawaii. The series of waves first came ashore at the North Spit station in Eureka after a 26-minute travel time, but the largest surges were seen just to the north at Crescent City and arrived close to low tide, a condition that would have lowered the risk had the surges had a destructive capacity. The first packet of energy reached that location in 47 minutes and had a maximum wave height of 35 cm (14 in), and a second, larger packet arrived later with a maximum amplitude of 53 cm (21 in). The waves were also detected to the south in the interior of San Francisco Bay at Alameda, but with a considerable delay (135 minutes after the mainshock), due to the shallow waters of the bay and the shelf surrounding the bay's entrance. The speed a tsunami travels is directly related to the depth of the water in which it is traversing. The tsunami was detected farther to the south in Monterey, for example, after just a 64-minute travel time, due to the deeper offshore waters and those in the Monterey Bay.

At 3,720 kilometers (2,310 mi) distant, the tsunami was perceptible on the Hawaiian island of Maui at Kahului. The location of the islands lay on a great circle route that is also perpendicular to the region of (presumed) uplifted land at the coast near Cape Mendocino and any energy distributed would be the strongest in that direction. No tsunami was detected at Johnston Atoll, 5,050 kilometers (3,140 mi) from Cape Mendocino in the north Pacific Ocean, but bottom pressure recorders registered a maximum amplitude of .4 cm (0.16 in) in 4,000 meters (13,000 ft) of water in the Gulf of Alaska, with 3.75 hours of travel time. While the waves generated by the earthquake were limited, the event demonstrated the rapid onset of tsunami hazards, giving little time for coastal residents to prepare. In this case, the strongest waves came ashore in Crescent City three to four hours after the initial surge, but it is possible to be just the opposite where the first waves could be the strongest. Also detailed from this event was that the wave hazard can be of long duration, with wave action lingering for more than eight hours.

== Other events ==
The Mendocino Fault is seismically active with mostly small and moderate earthquakes, but the largest event that was unequivocally associated with the fault was the M6.9 earthquake on September 1, 1994, at 125.8 W longitude. Aftershocks of that event with corresponding dextral strike-slip focal mechanisms occurred farther to the east and close to the Mendocino triple junction. Another large event (7.3–7.6) occurred on January 31, 1922 (with an aftershock of M7+ the next day) but the sources of these shocks could not be determined with any precision as the first seismographs did not arrive in the area until 1932. Due to their offshore epicenters all of these events caused little damage though were felt across a broad area. Previous Gorda plate events include the July 13 and August 17, 1991, shocks of 6.8 and 7.1 and the M7.3 event on November 10, 1980, west of Arcata.
