= Edward Pigot =

Edward Francis Pigot (18 September 1858 – 22 May 1929) was an Irish-born Australian Jesuit priest, seismologist and astronomer. He was president of the New South Wales branch of the British Astronomical Association in 1923–24 and a council member of the Royal Society of New South Wales from 1921 to 1929.

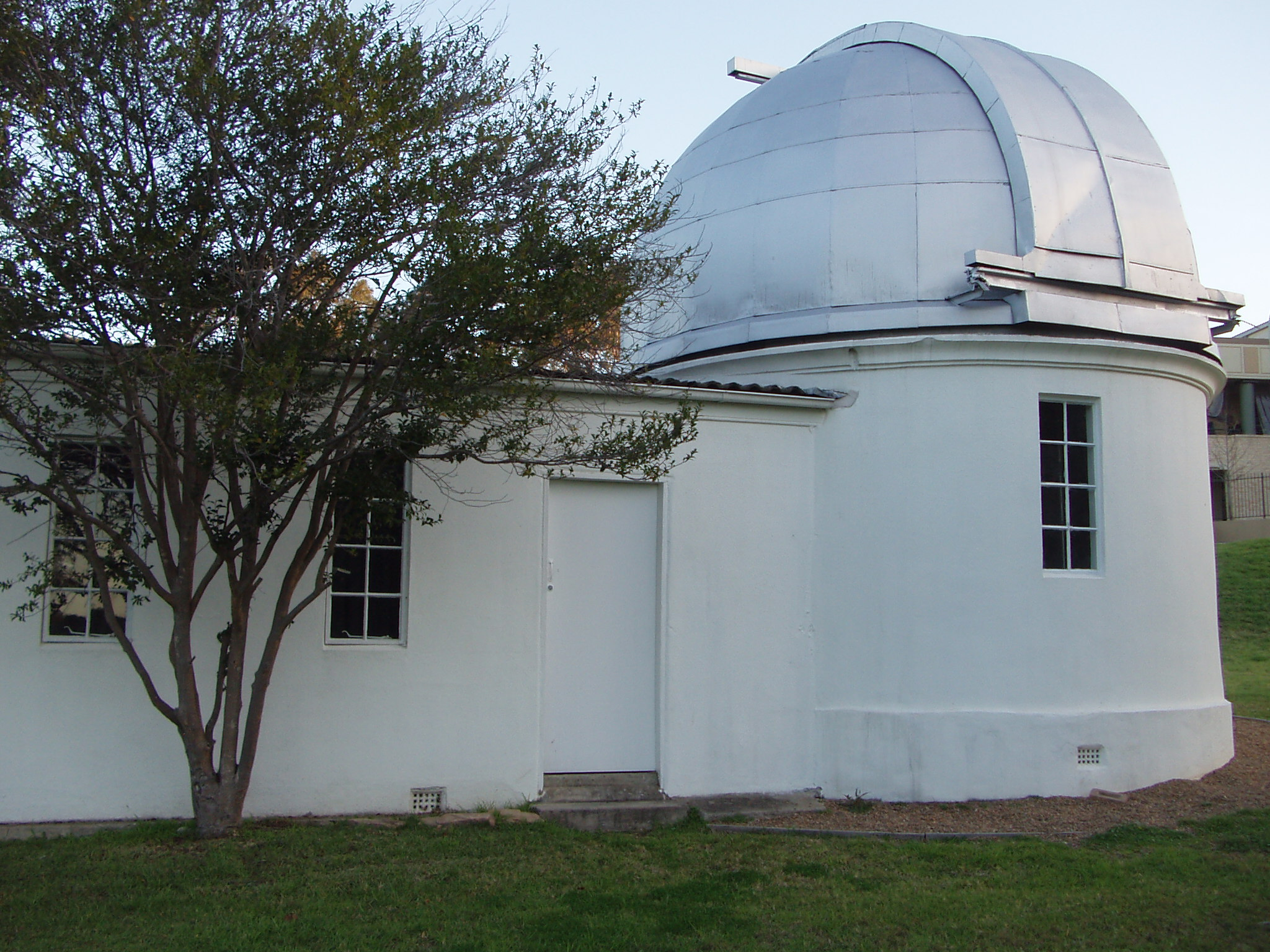
The observatory at Saint Ignatius' College, Riverview was founded by Edward Francis Pigot in 1908.

Pigot was born in Dundrum, Ireland, the son of David Richard Pigot junior (master of the Court of Exchequer) and Christina (née Murray), daughter of Sir James Murray, a well-known doctor and his first wife Mary Sharrock. His paternal grandparents were David Richard Pigot, Chief Baron of the Irish Exchequer and Catherine Page. Edward was initially educated by tutors at home and a governess. Pigot entered Trinity College, Dublin and graduated B.A. in 1879 and Bachelor of Surgery in 1882.

Pigot taught at University College, Dublin but emigrated to Australia in 1888 due to poor health. He then taught at St Francis Xavier's College, Melbourne, then at Saint Ignatius' College, Riverview, Sydney, as science master from August 1889. From 1892, he studied with French Jesuits on Jersey and then theology at Milltown Park in Dublin and was ordained a priest on 31 July 1898. He volunteered for the China Mission in 1899, and was located at the Zi-Ka-Wei Observatory (Xujiahui) until 1903 when he spent a year back in Australia. He spent three more years at Zi-Ka-Wei before coming to Sydney still in poor health.

Pigot had visited the Jesuit observatory in Manila and had plans to construct a world-class observatory at Riverview where he began meteorological observations 1 January 1908. A seismological station was also set up, Pigot ordering a set of Wiechert seismometers. Riverview College Observatory opened as a seismological station in March 1909 and seismological observations continue to be made there.

Between 1910 and 1922, Pigot travelled to Bruny Island Tasmania, Tonga and Goondiwindi, Queensland to observe total solar eclipses; he also visited several observatories in Europe and North America. He made measurements of tides, deflection of the Earth's crust and undertook experiments with a foucault pendulum. He observed a major earthquake on 1 September 1923 with a visiting Japanese seismologist, Fusakichi Omori. This quake, destroyed Tokyo.

From 1925 to 1929, Pigot took solar radiation measurements at Riverview and Orange for use in long-range weather forecasting. He contacted pneumonia while searching for a high-elevation site at Mount Canobolas. He died at North Sydne and was buried in Gore Hill Cemetery.

Edgeworth David said of him:

It was not only for his profound learning that scientists revered him. They could not fail to be attracted by his magnetic personality, for though frail and often in weak health, he ever preserved the same charming and cheerful manner, and was full of eagerness and enthusiasm in discussing plans for the better pursuit of scientific truth. Surely there never was any scientific man so well-beloved as he.

== See also ==
- List of Catholic clergy scientists
