= Aftershock =

Smaller earthquake which follows a larger one in the same area

In seismology, an aftershock is a smaller earthquake that follows a larger earthquake, in the same area of the main shock, caused as the displaced crust adjusts to the effects of the main shock. Large earthquakes can have hundreds to thousands of instrumentally detectable aftershocks, which steadily decrease in magnitude and frequency according to a consistent pattern. In some earthquakes the main rupture happens in two or more steps, resulting in multiple main shocks. These are known as doublet earthquakes, and in general can be distinguished from aftershocks in having similar magnitudes and nearly identical seismic waveforms.

== Distribution of aftershocks ==
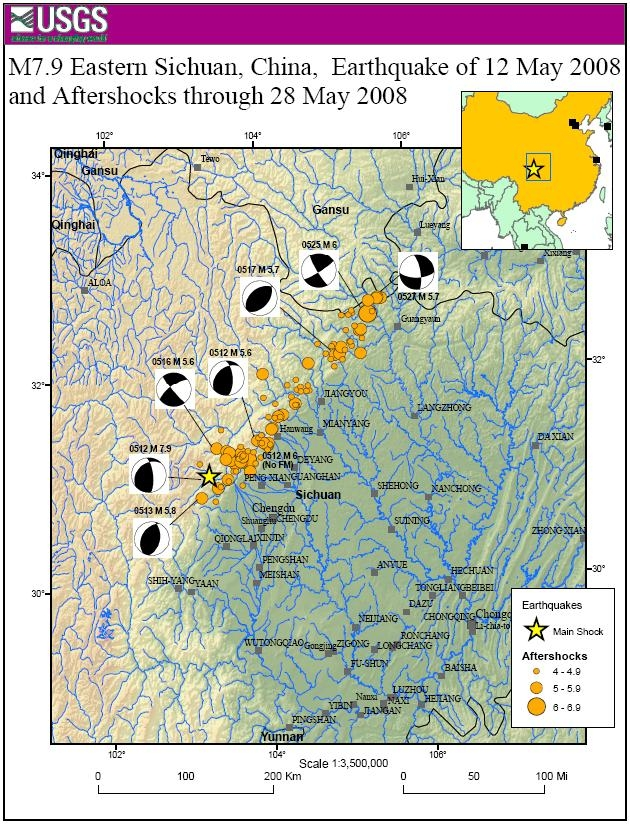

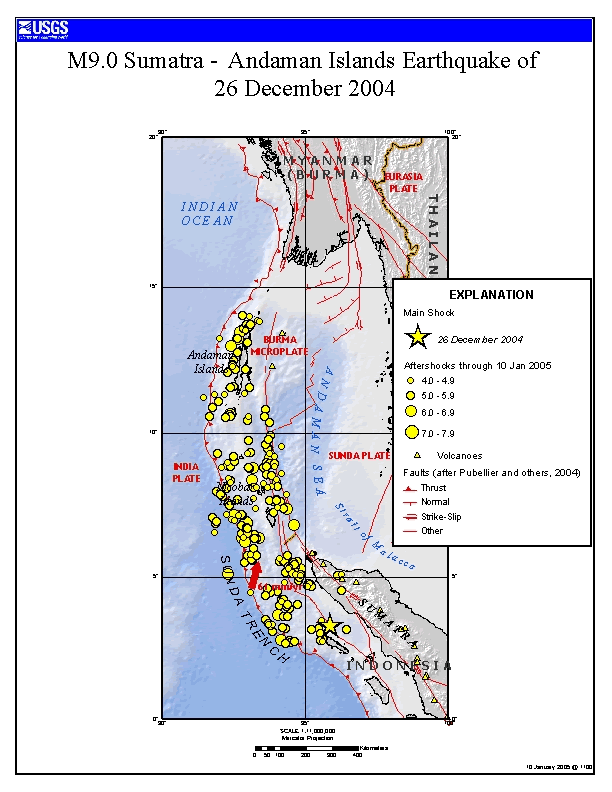

Most aftershocks are located over the full area of fault rupture and either occur along the fault plane itself or along other faults within the volume affected by the strain associated with the main shock. Typically, aftershocks are found up to a distance equal to the rupture length away from the fault plane.

The pattern of aftershocks helps confirm the size of area that slipped during the main shock. In both the 2004 Indian Ocean earthquake and the 2008 Sichuan earthquake, the aftershock distribution in each case showed that the epicenter (where the rupture initiated) lay to one end of the final area of slip, implying strongly asymmetric rupture propagation.

== Aftershock size and frequency with time ==
Aftershock rates and magnitudes follow several well-established empirical laws.

=== Omori's law ===
The frequency of aftershocks decreases roughly with the reciprocal of time after the main shock. This empirical relation was first described by Fusakichi Omori in 1894 and is known as Omori's law. It is expressed as

$$n(t) = \frac {k} {c+t}$$

where k and c are constants, which vary between earthquake sequences. A modified version of Omori's law, now commonly used, was proposed by Utsu in 1961.

$$n(t) = \frac {k} {(c+t)^p}$$

where p is a third constant which modifies the decay rate and typically falls in the range 0.7–1.5.

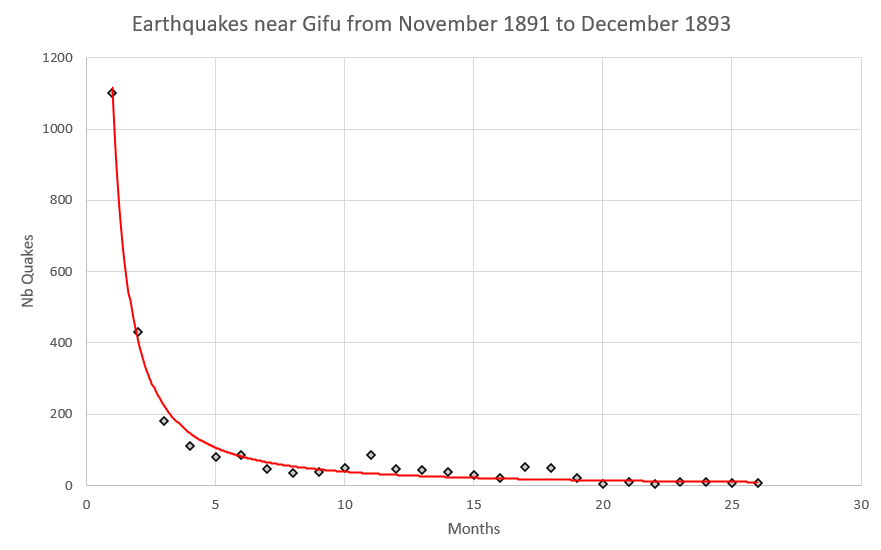
Omori's Law as defined based on aftershocks of the 1891 Mino–Owari earthquake (Japan).

According to these equations, the rate of aftershocks decreases quickly with time. The rate of aftershocks is proportional to the inverse of time since the mainshock and this relationship can be used to estimate the probability of future aftershock occurrence. Thus whatever the probability of an aftershock are on the first day, the second day will have 1/2 the probability of the first day and the tenth day will have approximately 1/10 the probability of the first day (when p is equal to 1). These patterns describe only the statistical behavior of aftershocks; the actual times, numbers and locations of the aftershocks are stochastic, while tending to follow these patterns. As this is an empirical law, values of the parameters are obtained by fitting to data after a mainshock has occurred, and they imply no specific physical mechanism in any given case.

The Utsu-Omori law has also been obtained theoretically, as the solution of a differential equation describing the evolution of the aftershock activity, where the interpretation of the evolution equation is based on the idea of deactivation of the faults in the vicinity of the main shock of the earthquake. Also, previously Utsu-Omori law was obtained from a nucleation process. Results show that the spatial and temporal distribution of aftershocks is separable into a dependence on space and a dependence on time. And more recently, through the application of a fractional solution of the reactive differential equation, a double power law model shows the number density decay in several possible ways, among which is a particular case the Utsu-Omori Law.

=== Båth's law ===
The other main law describing aftershocks is known as Båth's law, named after Markus Båth, and this states that the difference in magnitude between a main shock and its largest aftershock is approximately constant, independent of the main shock magnitude, typically 1.1–1.2 on the moment magnitude scale.

=== Gutenberg–Richter law ===
Gutenberg–Richter law for b = 1

Magnitude of the Central Italy earthquake of August 2016 (red dot) and aftershocks (which continued to occur after the period shown here)

Aftershock sequences also typically follow the Gutenberg–Richter law of size scaling, which refers to the relationship between the magnitude and total number of earthquakes in a region in a given time period.

$$\!\,N = 10^{a - b M}$$

Where:

- $N$ is the number of events greater or equal to $M$
- $M$ is magnitude
- $a$ and $b$ are constants

In summary, there are more small aftershocks and fewer large aftershocks.

== Effect of aftershocks ==
Aftershocks are dangerous because they are usually unpredictable, can be of a large magnitude, and can collapse buildings that are damaged from the main shock. Bigger earthquakes have more and larger aftershocks and the sequences can last for years or even longer especially when a large event occurs in a seismically quiet area; see, for example, the New Madrid seismic zone, where events still follow Omori's law from the main shocks of 1811–1812. An aftershock sequence is deemed to have ended when the rate of seismicity drops back to a background level; i.e., no further decay in the number of events with time can be detected.

Land movement around the New Madrid is reported to be no more than 0.2 mm (0.0079 in) a year, in contrast to the San Andreas Fault which averages up to 37 mm (1.5 in) a year across California. Aftershocks on the San Andreas are now believed to top out at 10 years while earthquakes in New Madrid were considered aftershocks nearly 200 years after the 1812 New Madrid earthquake.

== Foreshocks ==
Some scientists have tried to use foreshocks to help predict upcoming earthquakes, having one of their few successes with the 1975 Haicheng earthquake in China. On the East Pacific Rise however, transform faults show quite predictable foreshock behaviour before the main seismic event. Reviews of data of past events and their foreshocks showed that they have a low number of aftershocks and high foreshock rates compared to continental strike-slip faults.

== Modeling ==
Seismologists use tools such as the Epidemic-Type Aftershock Sequence model (ETAS) to study cascading aftershocks and foreshocks.

== Psychology ==
Following a large earthquake and aftershocks, many people have reported feeling "phantom earthquakes" when in fact no earthquake was taking place. This condition, known as "earthquake sickness" is thought to be related to motion sickness, and usually goes away as seismic activity tails off.

== See also ==
- Afterslip
