= Masonic Temple (Ferndale, California) =

Lodge hall built in 1891

Coordinates: 40°34′30.77″N 124°15′55.53″W

- U.S. Historic district – Contributing property
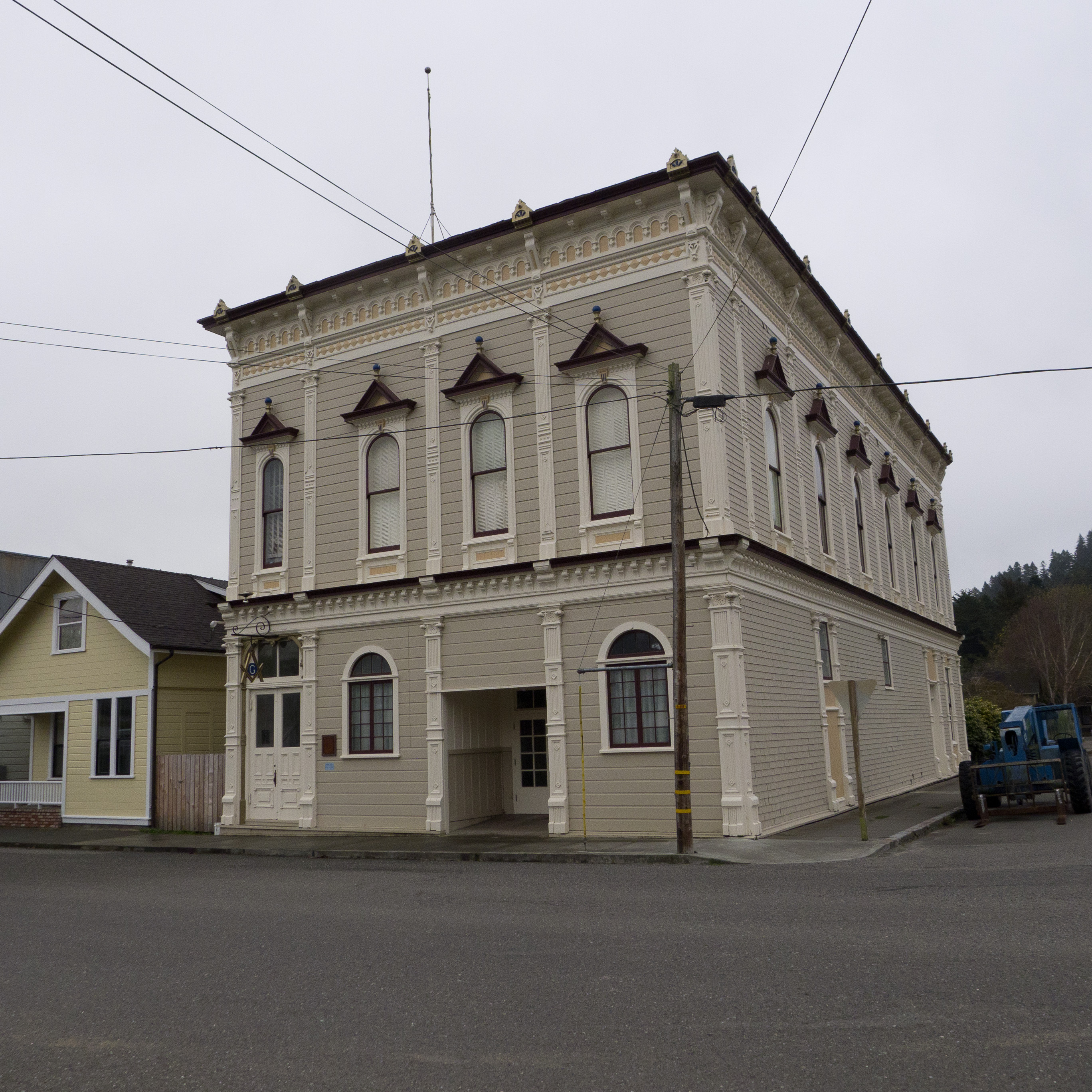
- Location: 212 Francis Street; Ferndale, California
- Built: 1891
- Architectural style: Eastlake-Stick
- Part of: Ferndale Main Street Historic District (ID93001461)
- Added to NRHP: 10 January 1994

The Masonic Temple in Ferndale, California is located at 212 Francis Street, in an Eastlake-Stick style building built in 1891. The Masonic Hall is a contributing property in the Ferndale Main Street Historic District which was added on 10 January 1994 to the National Register of Historic Places. Ferndale Masonic Lodge Free & Accepted Masons #193 holds meetings in the building.

== History ==
Charter member and first worshipful master of the Ferndale Lodge for two terms in 1869 and 1870, Seth Louis Shaw (March 23, 1816 – November 23, 1872), was a lifelong Mason, starting in Nashville, Tennessee, where he became a master Mason and later worshipful master of the same lodge. After traveling to California in the Gold Rush, Shaw was one of the charter members of the Humboldt Lodge in Eureka, California before the founding of the Ferndale Lodge.

The Ferndale lodge was chartered on 14 October 1869 by the grand lodge in San Francisco. The earliest meetings of the Ferndale Lodge were held over a store at the corner of Ocean Avenue and Francis Street, now the site of a repurposed gas station. In 1872 Shaw's son, Joseph Armitage Shaw, was worshipful master of the Ferndale Lodge. In 1874 and 1875, the Lodge worked on building a new hall which is now the I.O.O.F. Hall on Main Street.

The most disastrous fire in the town's history, on 6 and 7 September 1875, burned both the store and the hall. All that survived was a ledger and one minute book from 1874. The new hall building that was being built, escaped the flames, but in 1876 the lodge found the cost of the new building too much and sold a half-interest to the Odd Fellows.

== The new Masonic Hall ==
The new Masonic Temple built by Ira Russ and members of the lodge in 1891 was described as "a structure of magnificent proportions, and modern architecture." The upper floor was used for meetings, the lower floor was rented for various purposes. The Ferndale Lodge sold the remaining half-interest in their old hall to the Odd Fellows in 1891.

In March 1895, the first floor was used by the Ferndale kindergarten. In 1896 a side addition to the hall was built by Blakemore and Briggs. Two years later, the Ferndale Commercial School opened on 22 August 1898 in what was then called the Town Hall in the Masonic Building. In August 1899, Ferndale's first high school started in the council rooms at the Masonic Building, and in 1901 the Ferndale Business College opened on the Eugene Street side of the Hall.

The building was twisted out of shape and the lower story plastering loosened in the 24 April 1906 San Francisco earthquake. Repairs were undertaken immediately and in September 1907, all the first floor rooms were combined into one and a kitchen was added by P. R. Burris and Ira Goff. In 1914 another kindergarten opened in the hall. In early 1928 the hall was extensively remodeled, and repaired again in 1992 after the earthquakes.
