= Ferndale Museum =

Nonprofit history museum in Humboldt County, California

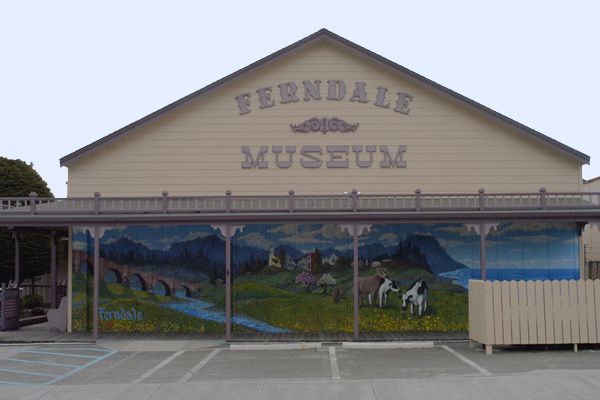
- The Shaw Avenue side of the museum is muraled.
- Established: 1979
- Location: 515 Shaw Avenue, Ferndale, California
- Type: History
- Collections: Domestic, Technology, Economic Foundations, Native American, Fine Art, photographs, publications
- Visitors: 1300 annually
- Parking: onsite
- Website: http://ferndale-museum.org/

The nonprofit Ferndale Museum, located in Ferndale, California, houses and exhibits artifacts, documents and papers from settlement during the California Gold Rush to the present including an active Bosch-Omori seismograph. The area of collection covers the lower Eel River Valley as far south as the Mattole River Valley and west to the Pacific Ocean. Collections include over 8,000 photographs, back issues of the Ferndale Enterprise newspaper, and family papers spanning 150 years.

== History ==
The museum was founded on September 22, 1979 after a two-year period of renovating an existing building to house its collection. It has always been located on Shaw Avenue, Ferndale.

== Collection ==
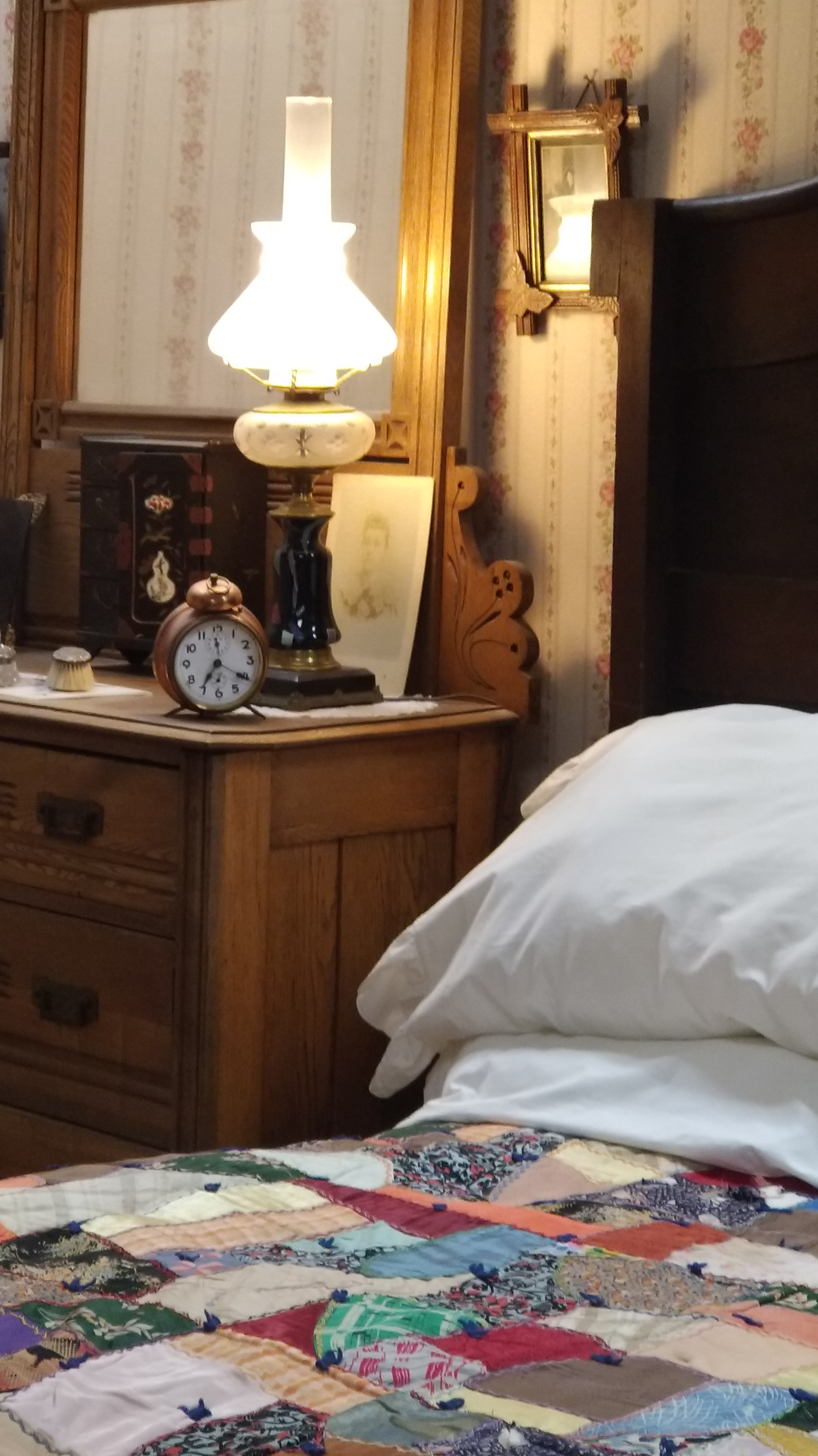
This bedroom exhibit is one of the domestic room exhibits depicting 19th century life.

Historical exhibits include decorated rooms, where visitors can look through windows and doors of what could have been homes and businesses in late 1800s to early 1900s. A working player piano is located in a Victorian parlor near detailed miniature dollhouses of Victorian buildings.

Banks of switchboards, where operators used corded plugs to connect callers, are displayed along with working crank telephones. Other historical exhibits include nautical history and artifacts from the first oil well drilled (1865) in California at Petrolia.

Exhibits include farming, ranching, and blacksmithing. The lumber and dairy industries are also covered.

Native American artifacts, including baskets from the local Wiyot, Yurok, Karuk and Hupa, are exhibited along with interpretive information. Other artifacts include a woman's buckskin headband, hair ties used by a shaman, a smoking pipe, wrapping skin, and a gambling drum. Native wildlife displays also help interpret life of the times.

Artwork exhibited include paintings from the 1860s by portrait painter Stephen William Shaw and photographs by Edna Garrett.

In 2007, artists collective Empire Squared of Eureka, California donated labor to paint a mural featuring local history and scenery on the Shaw Street side of the museum.

== Selections from the permanent collection ==
=== Bosch-Omori seismograph exhibit ===
Ferndale resident Joseph Jordan Bognuda (2 October 1889 Vacaville, California – 7 January 1979 Fortuna, California) became interested in earthquakes after living through the 1906 San Francisco which caused considerable damage in Ferndale and over the entire Eel River Valley. Bognuda began a correspondence with Dr. Periz Byerly and attended lectures at the University of California at Berkeley which resulted in the university and the United States Coast and Geodetic Survey establishing a Ferndale Seismographic Station with a lighter Bosch-Omori Seismograph than the one in active use at Berkeley at the same time.

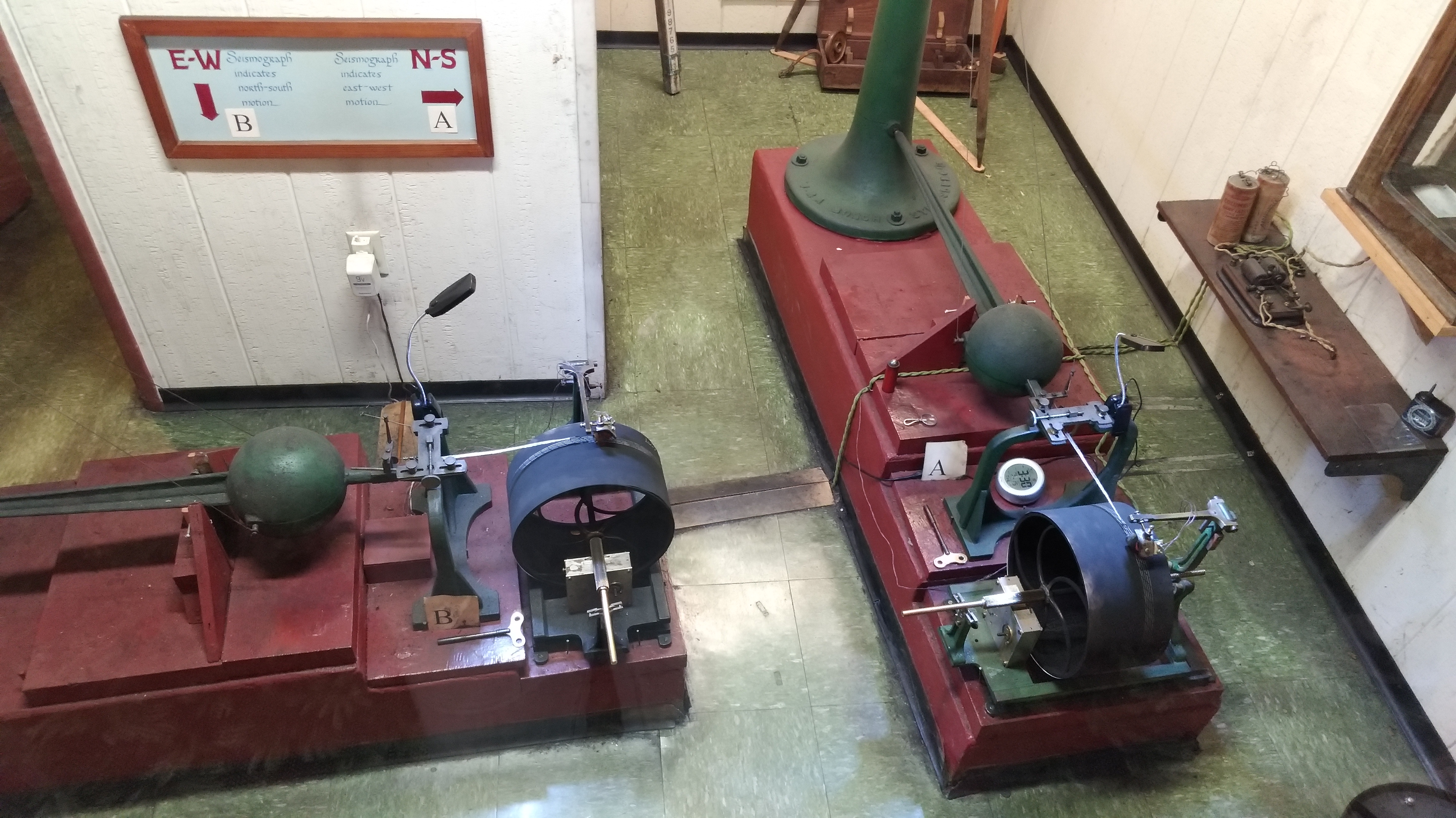
The working Bosch-Omori Seismograph.

Omori Seismographs were developed by Fusakichi Omori, a seismologist at the Imperial University of Tokyo and further refined by J.A. Bosch of Strasbourg who added a damping mechanism.

Bosch-Omori Seismographs are made of two units, one to detect movement North to South and the other East to West. Each has a pendulum which can pivot, restrained by a flexible wire and have a recording needle which traces on smoked paper, controlled by a weight-powered timepiece.

The seismograph parts were shipped from Berkeley to Ferndale and assembled by Bognuda and Horace Winslow of the U.S. Coast and Geodetic Survey in what is now the Ferndale Fire Department building. This new Ferndale Station, abbreviated "FER" – located at 40°34′33.74″N 124°15′48.92″W – became active on January 25, 1933.

During the nearly 30 years FER station was in operation, newspapers throughout the U.S. contacted it for information about California earthquakes. With daily observations, Bognuda solved an old puzzle about constantly wiggling traces, by correlating vibrations recorded at FER station to heavy surf on the nearby coast, an effect now called wave-generated microseism.

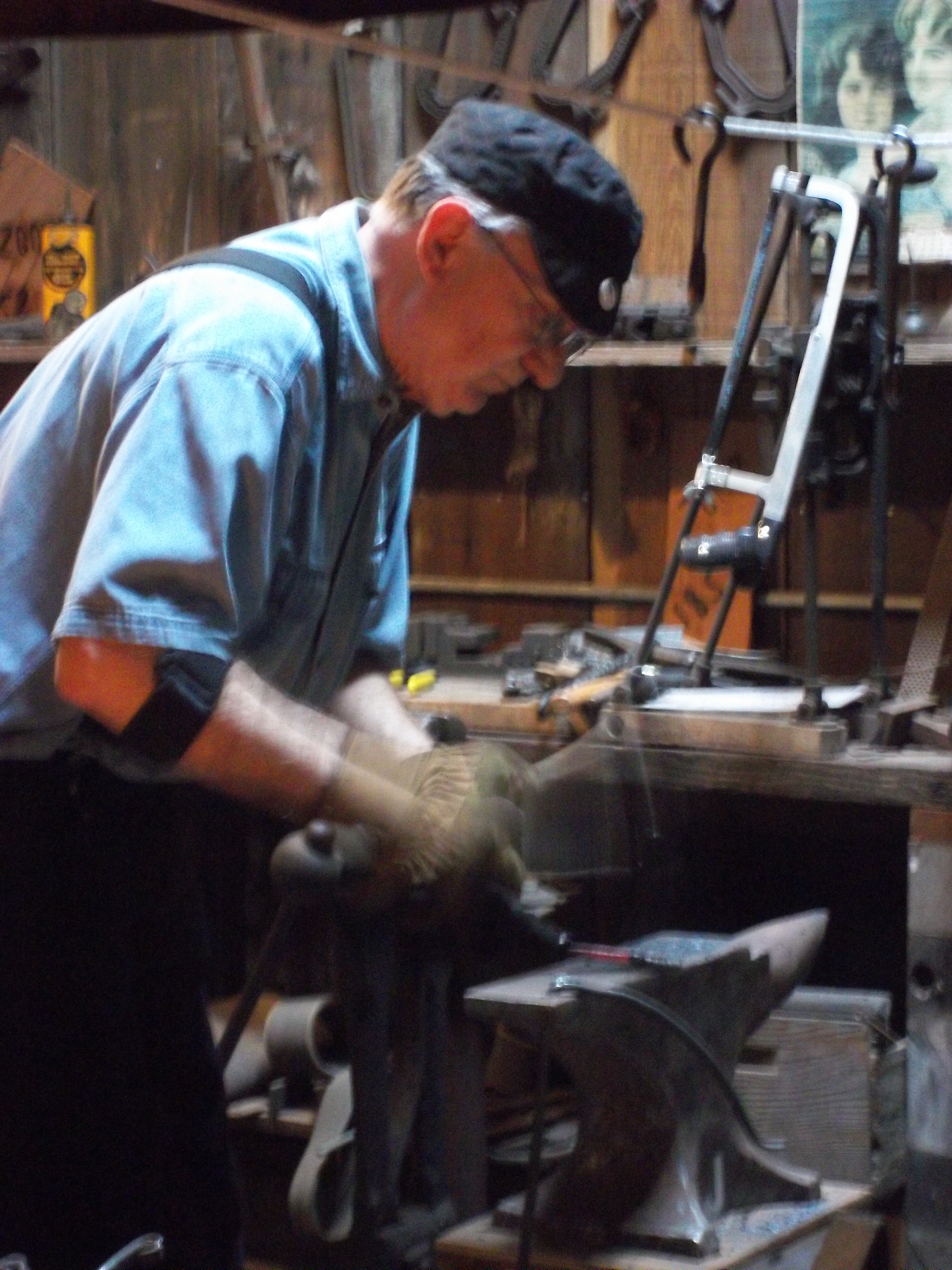
J.D. Murry giving a blacksmithing demonstration in the Ferndale Museum Annex. He is pictured working iron atop a 104-pound Trenton anvil dating from the 1930s.

The FER station became inactive in 1962 when advances in seismic technology rendered it and several others in the state obsolete. The Bosch-Omori seismograph was donated to the city of Ferndale by the university, which moved to the museum in 1981 where it continues to record daily.

=== Blacksmith shop and forge ===
A working blacksmith shop and forge displays hundreds of items that made up a local blacksmith shop. Live demonstrations of blacksmithing are given in the shop.

The exhibit is a complete 19th century forge (also known as a Smithy or Blacksmith Shop) originally located in Table Bluff, California. It has over 46 hammers, two anvils, tongs, rasp, wire brushes, chisels, gloves, aprons, a coal and/or coke fired forge, bellows, and numerous other tools of the trade. The shop operated from at least 1875 until 1962 under various owners. Also displayed are 80 cattle branding irons.

== Genealogical research ==
The museum maintains a research room with local materials including "145 years of the Ferndale Enterprise, family records and photo albums, books, photographs, materials on major events, school fraternal organization ephemera, maps, [and] old telephone books."

== Publications and awards ==
The museum publishes books, videos, and a research-based newsletter.

"Letters Home", detailing the town's involvement in World War II, won the Western History Association Autry History Prize in 2011 as the "best contribution to local history in any medium" in the United States.

== Governanace ==
In 2022, attendance was around 1,300 in addition to a total of approximately 750 museum memberships.

The museum is nonprofit and supported privately with memberships, attendance donations, donations, and grants.

The museum employs a director, hired and managed by its board of directors, and contracts services for the original research and publication of its research oriented newsletter, Our Story.

== See also ==
- List of museums in the North Coast (California)
