= North Coast (California) =

Region of California, United States

Coordinates: 39.75°N 123.5°W

- Region
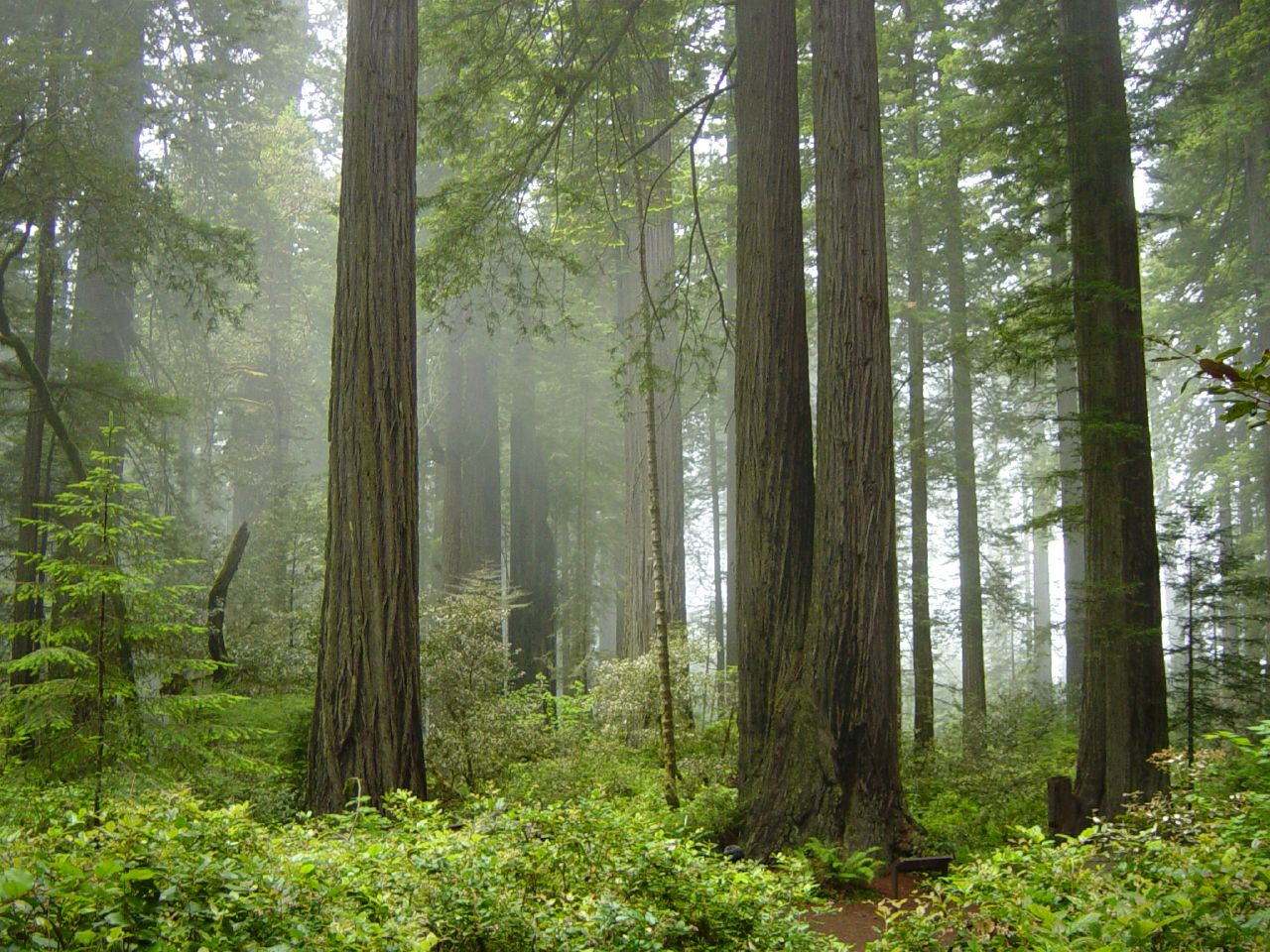
- Coast Redwood forest in Redwood National Park

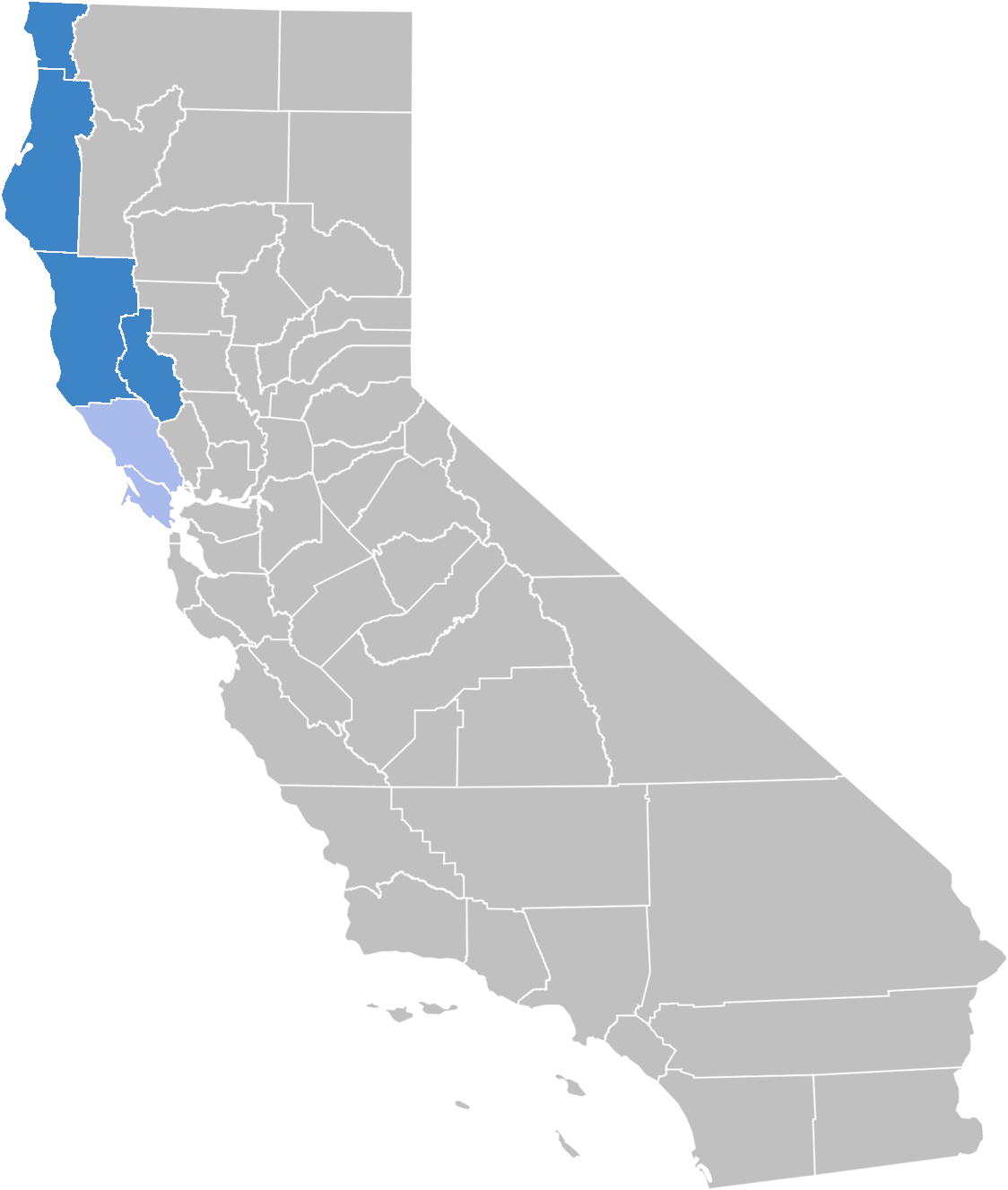
- Location of the North Coast in California (The lighter shaded area includes Bay Area counties that are included in some definitions)
- Country: United States
- State: California

Area
  - Land: 10,176.86 sq mi (26,357.9 km^{2})

Population (April 1, 2010)
  - Total: 987,361
  - Estimate (2019): 1,003,281
  - Density: 99/sq mi (38/km^{2})

The North Coast of California (also called the Redwood Empire or the Redwood Coast in reference to the dense redwood forests throughout the region) is a region in Northern California that lies on the Pacific coast between San Francisco Bay and the Oregon border. It commonly includes Mendocino, Humboldt, and Del Norte counties and sometimes includes Lake and two counties from the San Francisco Bay Area: Marin and Sonoma.

== Cities ==
Much of the area is rural containing few major cities. The only city with a population of over 100,000 is Santa Rosa (population 178,000) in Sonoma County, which is the largest city of the North Coast under the five-county definition. Despite their relatively smaller size to the major cities elsewhere in the state, many of the region's cities and towns have historical importance to the state or regional importance.

=== County seats ===
- Del Norte: Crescent City
- Humboldt: Eureka
- Lake: Lakeport
- Marin: San Rafael
- Mendocino: Ukiah
- Sonoma: Santa Rosa

== Geography ==
The Pacific Ocean coast stretches from San Francisco Bay to Humboldt Bay and on to the border of Oregon. The coastline is often inaccessible, and includes rocky cliffs and hills, streams and tide pools. The coastline from Centerville Beach near Ferndale to the mouth of the Klamath River is mostly beach accessible and there are many small towns and a few cities along Highway 101, the main route through the region. The sparsely populated interior territory further inland is characterized by rugged, often steep mountains, bisected by rivers and their typically narrow valleys and canyons, and dense redwood, Douglas fir, and oak forests. The climate can range from coast side lands drenched with fog in mild winters and summers to inland reaches baked by hot sunshine on long summer days, which, at higher elevations, can be blanketed with snow in winter.

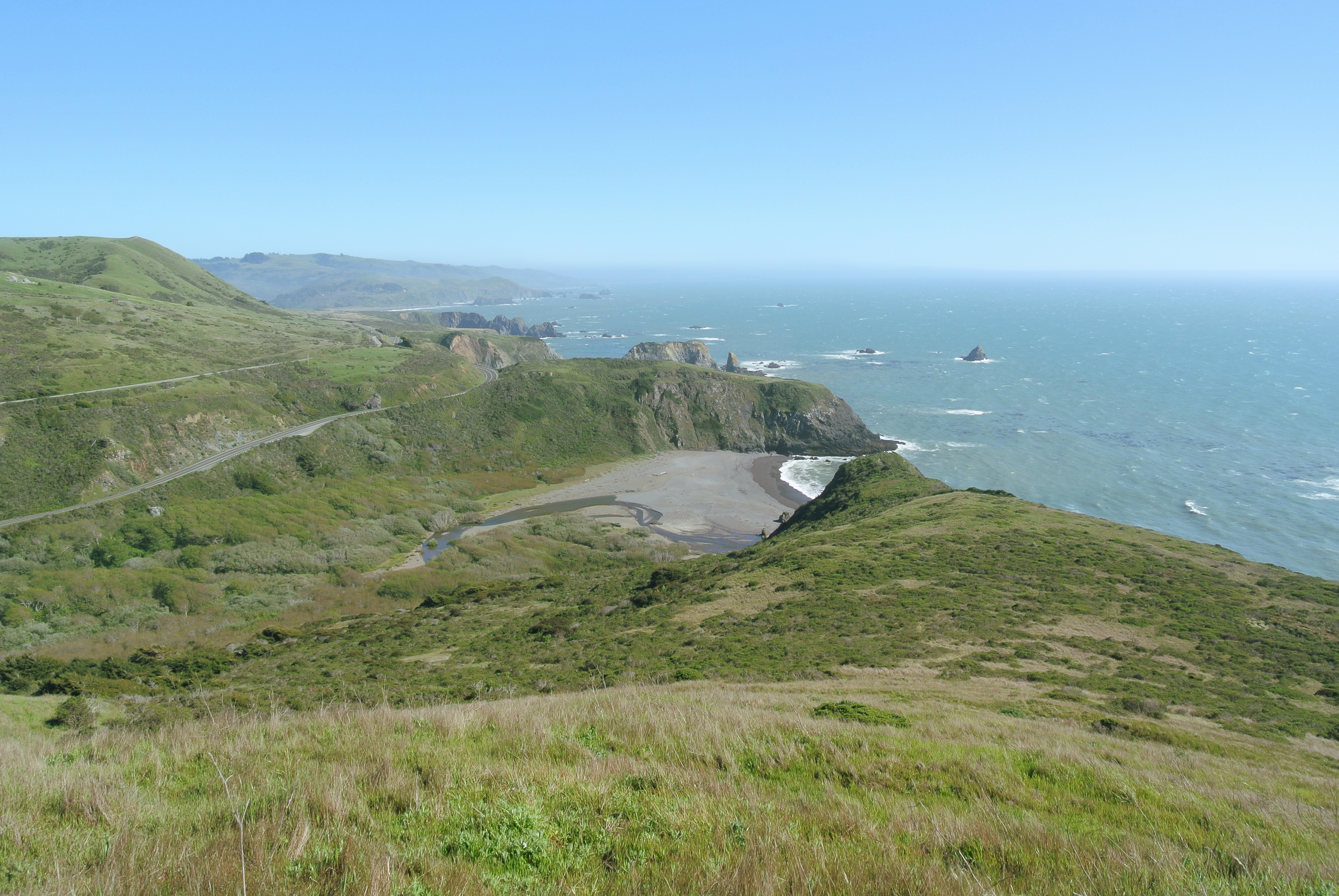
Coastline in Sonoma Coast State Park

The southern portion of the North Coast is largely urbanized while the rest is mostly rural. The more remote northern areas are often referred to as being located "behind the Redwood Curtain." A segment of the coastline in Mendocino and Humboldt Counties is known as the Lost Coast, and is only accessible by a few back roads. Notable seaside beaches can be found at Marin Headlands and Point Reyes National Seashore in the south, with innumerable examples of remote or less used beaches north of the San Francisco Bay area.

The grandeur of the redwoods can be experienced throughout the region, from the protected groves of Muir Woods National Monument and Armstrong Redwoods State Natural Reserve in the south to the massive forests of Humboldt Redwoods State Park along the Avenue of the Giants in the north. Redwoods are also found in many other State and local parks, most of which are located along Highway 101 throughout the far North Coast. Other larger redwood parks include Prairie Creek Redwoods State Park, Del Norte Coast Redwoods State Park, Jedediah Smith Redwoods State Park and Redwood National and State Parks. In total, the redwood parks of the North Coast contain the vast majority of all remaining old-growth redwoods.

== Demographics ==
Historical population
Census	Pop.	Note	%±
1860	23,855		—
1870	42,429		77.9%
1880	68,146		60.6%
1890	89,466		31.3%
1900	104,159		16.4%
1910	133,711		28.4%
1920	143,720		7.5%
1930	175,347		22.0%
1940	200,380		14.3%
1950	307,197		53.3%
1960	467,917		52.3%
1970	576,296		23.2%
1980	715,718		24.2%
1990	841,241		17.5%
2000	946,193		12.5%
2010	987,361		4.4%
2019 (est.)	1,003,281		1.6%
Sources: 1790–1990, 2000, 2010, 2019; Chart does not include Indigenous population figures.

=== 2010 ===
The 2010 United States census reported that the North Coast region had a population of 987,361. The racial makeup was 771,611 (78.1%) White, 17,717 (1.8%) African American, 22,259 (2.3%) Native American, 37,461 (3.8%) Asian, 2,570 (0.3%) Pacific Islander, 91,107 (9.2%) from other races, and 44,636 (4.5%) from two or more races. Hispanic or Latino of any race were 197,308 persons (20.0%).

== Transportation infrastructure ==
=== Major highways ===
- Interstate 580
- U.S. Route 101 – Primary north–south route from San Francisco to Crescent City
- U.S. Route 199 – from U.S. Route 101 near Crescent City northeast to Interstate 5 at Grants Pass, Oregon
- State Route 1 – San Francisco to junction with US 101 at Leggett
- State Route 12 – from Sebastopol to San Andreas
- State Route 20 – an east–west route ending at Fort Bragg
- State Route 36 – an east–west route beginning at Alton, ending at Susanville
- State Route 37 – on the northern shore of San Pablo Bay
- State Route 96
- State Route 116
- State Route 121
- State Route 128
- State Route 131 – (Tiburon Boulevard)
- State Route 162
- State Route 169
- State Route 175
- State Route 197
- State Route 200 – near Arcata, along the Mad River
- State Route 208 – (former route (from Rockport to Leggett))
- State Route 211 – Fernbridge to Ferndale
- State Route 222 – (unsigned)
- State Route 253
- State Route 254 – (Avenue of the Giants – old U.S. 101)
- State Route 255
- State Route 271 – (old U.S. 101)
- State Route 283 – (old U.S. 101)
- State Route 299

=== Public transportation ===
Public transportation serving the North Coast includes bus services provided by national regional operators Amtrak and Greyhound, regional and countywide bus services (such as Golden Gate Transit, Mendocino Transit Authority, Humboldt Transit Authority and Redwood Coast Transit) as well as bus services operated within individual municipalities (e.g., Cloverdale Transit, Petaluma Transit, and the Arcata and Mad River Transit System). Rail transit between Sonoma and Marin Counties is operated by Sonoma-Marin Area Rail Transit, with ferryboat connections from Marin County to San Francisco provided by Golden Gate Ferry.

== Related regions ==
Parts of these regions overlap parts of the North Coast:

- Emerald Triangle
- North Bay
- San Francisco Bay Area
- Wine Country

Regions contained entirely within the North Coast:

- Lost Coast

The North Coast region is completely contained within:

- Northern California

== See also ==
- California's 2nd congressional district
- Central Coast (California)
- North Coast AVA
- South Coast (California)
- West Coast lumber trade
