= California State Route 271 =

State highway in Humboldt and Mendocino Counties, California, United States

State Route 271
- SR 271 highlighted in red

Route information
- Maintained by Caltrans
- Length: 14.84 mi (23.88 km)

Section 1
- South end: US 101 at Cummings
- North end: SR 1 at Leggett

Section 2
- South end: US 101 at Reynolds
- North end: US 101 at Cooks Valley

Location
- Country: United States
- State: California
- Counties: Mendocino, Humboldt

Highway system
- State highways in California; Interstate; US; State; Scenic; History; Pre‑1964; Unconstructed; Deleted; Freeways
← SR 270	→ SR 273

State Route 271 (SR 271) is a state highway in the U.S. state of California that runs along a former routing of U.S. Route 101 (US 101) in Mendocino and Humboldt counties. It also connects with State Route 1 just before that route's terminus with US 101 in Leggett. After US 101 was realigned, SR 271 was reduced to being a frontage road in discontinuous segments. While US 101 stays mostly in second growth redwoods, SR 271 is used as a scenic alternate through several old growth redwood groves.

== Route description ==
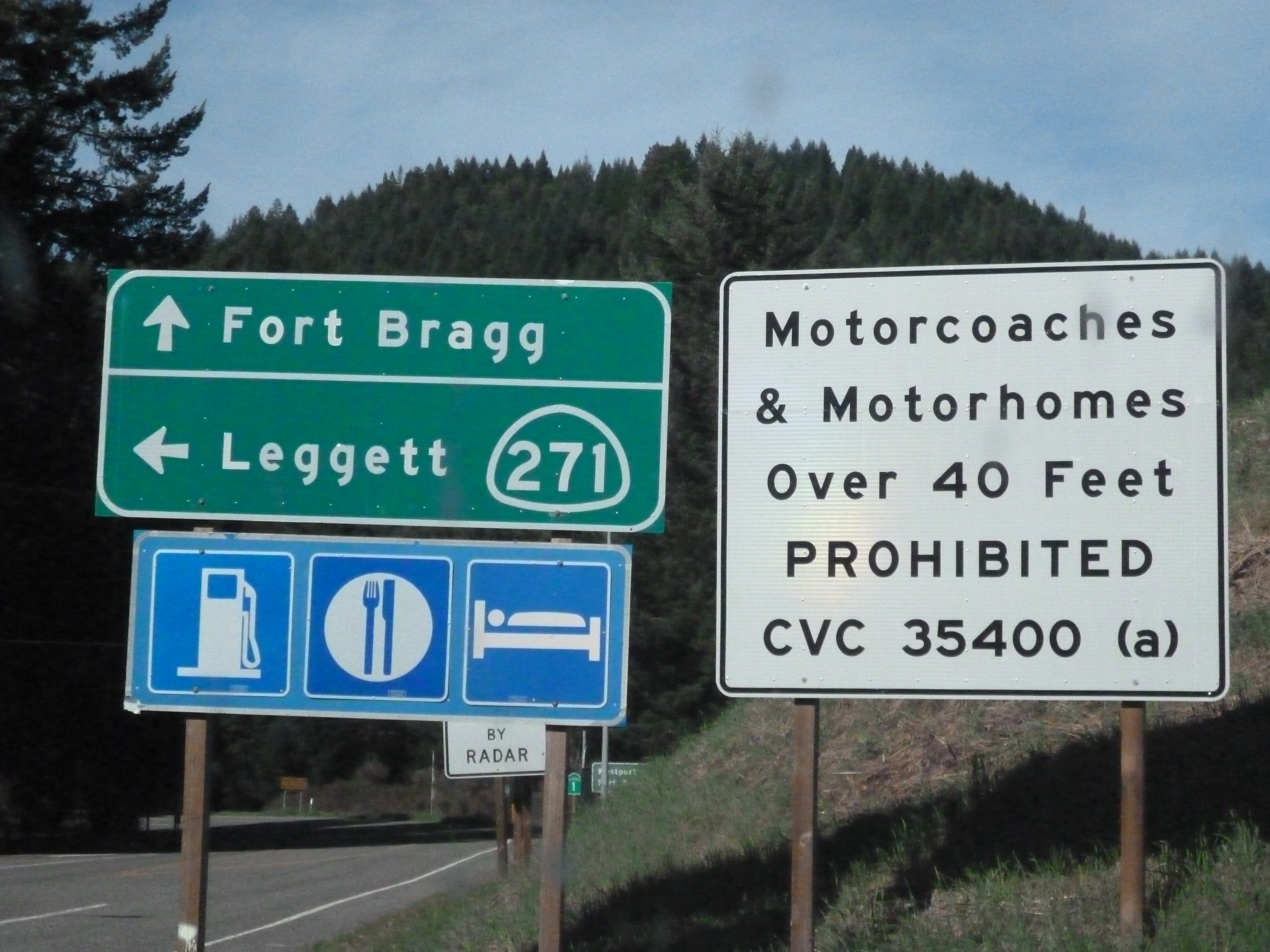
Sign at the north end of California Route 1 showing direction of California Route 271.

Route 271 is defined in section 571 of the California Streets and Highways Code, and that the highway is "from Route 101 near Cummings to Route 101 near the Humboldt-Mendocino county line". The definition includes the gap between the highway's two discontinuous segments.

The southern portion of SR 271 begins at an interchange with US 101 in the community of Cummings. SR 271 winds through the forest, paralleling US 101 and intersecting it twice on its northwest journey. The highway eventually comes into the southern area of Leggett, where SR 271 comes to another grade-separated interchange with US 101. The road continues north, paralleling US 101 to the west, and passing through the Drive-Thru Tree Park. The southern segment of SR 271 terminates at SR 1 in Leggett.

The northern portion of SR 271 begins at another interchange with US 101 in Reynolds and first parallels US 101 to the east. At an interchange in the community of Piercy, it passes to the west of US 101 and continues north to the community of Cooks Valley, where it terminates at an interchange with US 101.

SR 271 is not part of the National Highway System, a network of highways that are considered essential to the country's economy, defense, and mobility by the Federal Highway Administration.

== History ==
SR 271 was part of U.S. Route 101 until a freeway bypass was built in 1970–1974, assuming the 101 designation. The former highway was then designated as SR 271. The segment of the freeway bypass between Leggett and Reynolds has never been built due to environmental concerns, thus resulting in the gap in SR 271 between the two communities.

== Major intersections ==
Except where prefixed with a letter, postmiles were measured on the road as it was in 1964, based on the alignment that existed at the time, and do not necessarily reflect current mileage. Postmile prefixes include: R reflecting a realignment in the route since then, M indicating a second realignment, L referring to an overlap due to a correction or change, and T indicating postmiles classified as temporary. Segments that remain unconstructed or have been relinquished to local control may be omitted. The numbers reset at county lines; the start and end postmiles in each county are given in the county column.

County	Location	Postmile	Destinations	Notes
Mendocino; MEN 0.00-22.72		0.00	US 101 – Eureka, Ukiah	Interchange; south end of SR 271; US 101 exit 609
Mendocino; MEN 0.00-22.72	South Leggett	5.60	US 101	Interchange; US 101 exit 614 (as South Leggett)
Mendocino; MEN 0.00-22.72	Leggett	7.31	SR 1 to US 101 – Fort Bragg	Northern end of southern section of SR 271; former SR 208
Mendocino; MEN 0.00-22.72	Gap in route			
Mendocino; MEN 0.00-22.72	Reynolds	R17.05	US 101	Interchange; southern end of northern section of SR 271; US 101 exit 625
Mendocino; MEN 0.00-22.72	Piercy	19.46	US 101	Interchange; US 101 exit 627 (as Piercy)
Humboldt; HUM 0.00-0.30	Cooks Valley	0.30	US 101	North end of SR 271
1.000 mi = 1.609 km; 1.000 km = 0.621 mi
