= Lost Coast =

Region of California, United States

- Region of California
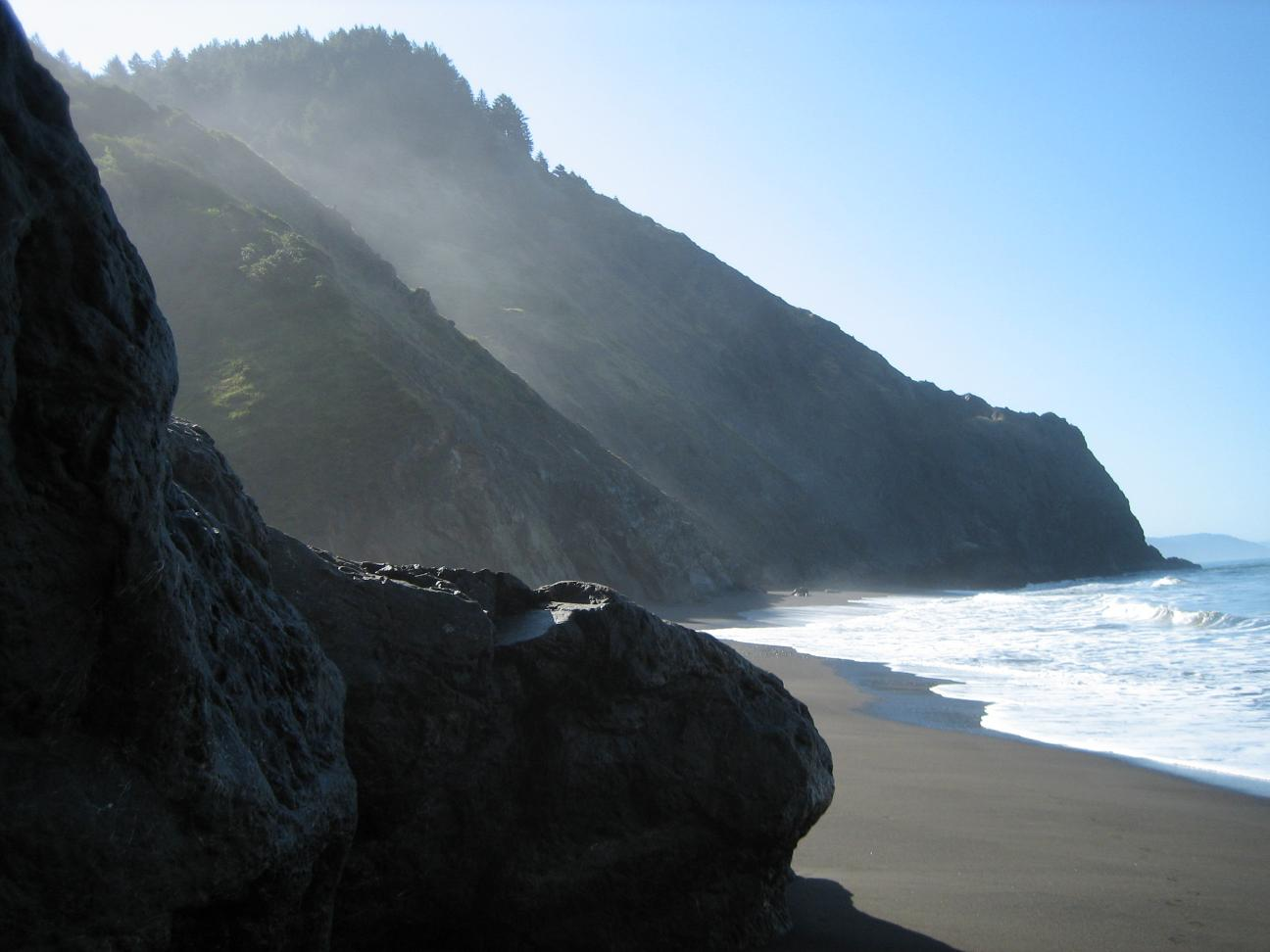
- The Lost Coast
- Interactive map of Lost Coast
- Coordinates: 40.4401°N 124.4095°W
- State: California
- Time zone: Pacific Time
- Area code: 707

The Lost Coast is a mostly natural and undeveloped area of the California North Coast in Humboldt and Mendocino counties, which includes the King Range. It was named the "Lost Coast" after the area experienced depopulation in the 1930s. In addition, the steepness and related geotechnical challenges of the coastal mountains made this stretch of coastline too costly for state highway or county road builders to establish routes through the area, leaving it the most undeveloped and remote portion of the California coast. Without any major highways, communities in the Lost Coast region such as Petrolia, Shelter Cove, and Whitethorn are somewhat isolated from the rest of California.

The region lies roughly between Rockport and Ferndale. At the south end, State Route 1, which runs very close along the coast for most of its length, turns inland at Rockport before merging with U.S. Route 101 at Leggett. At the north end, State Route 211 begins its journey at Ferndale, heading towards Highway 101 in Fernbridge. Section 511 of the California Streets and Highways Code still says that "Route 211 is from Route 1 near Rockport to Route 101 near Fernbridge", but it is unlikely that the portion of Route 1 south of Ferndale will be built. Most of the region's coastline is now part of either Sinkyone Wilderness State Park or King Range National Conservation Area.

== Geology and climate ==
The Lost Coast consists of undivided Cretaceous marine metasedimentary and sedimentary rocks of the North American Plate steeply uplifted by Mendocino triple junction interactions with the Pacific Plate and Gorda Plate. The Lost Coast includes Tertiary marine sedimentary formations north of the Mattole River and a portion of the Franciscan Assemblage called Point Delgada at Shelter Cove. The steepness of uplift has created a coastal ridge forming a drainage divide parallel to the coast. The drainage pattern between Usal Creek and the Mattole River is a series of short streams with steep channel gradients.

Like the surrounding coast, the Lost Coast experiences a wet season and a dry season. The wet season ranges from October to April. The King Range mountains collect significant moisture from storms coming from the Pacific Ocean, making it one of the wettest sections of the California coastline. Local weather stations typically record over 100 inches (2.5 m) annually of rainfall, and during wet years, over 200 inches (5.1 m) can fall along the Lost Coast. Snow can blanket the higher peaks after storms, but melts quickly.

From May to September, the mountain areas are mostly warm and dry with temperatures reaching 80 °F (27 °C)–90 °F (32 °C) in mid-summer, but the weather is still highly variable, with some days of fog and light rain.

== Humboldt County ==
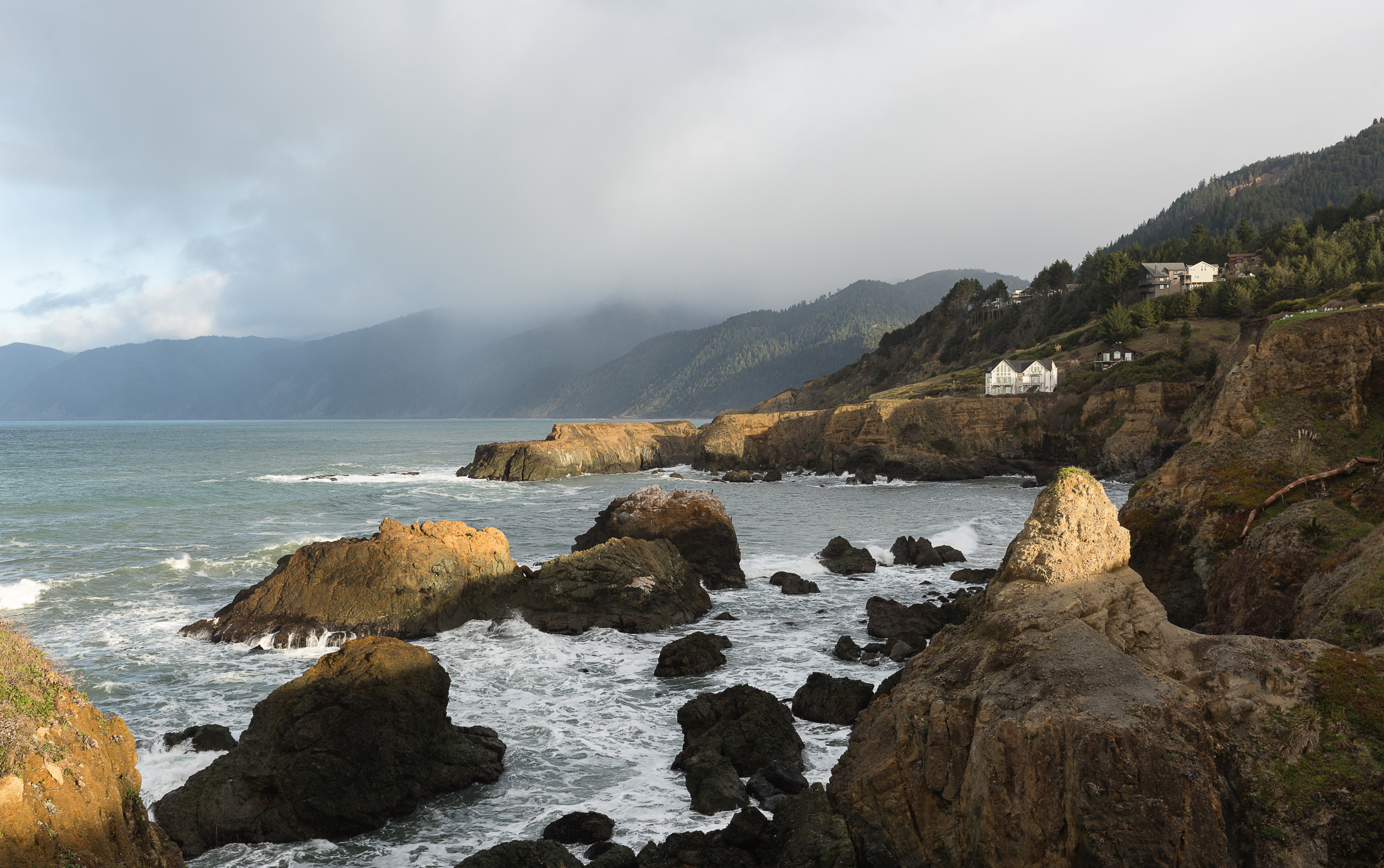
Coastline near Shelter Cove

Much of the land in the area is owned by the federal government, and in 1970, more than 60,000 acres (240 km^{2}) were designated the King Range National Conservation Area.

Because of the rugged and remote location, the small towns of Shelter Cove, Whitethorn and Petrolia are popular with those looking for quiet respite. The area is known for its black sand beaches, which get their color from dark colored sandstone called greywacke and an older compressed shale produced by tectonic activity of one continental and two oceanic plates meeting just offshore.

== Mendocino County ==
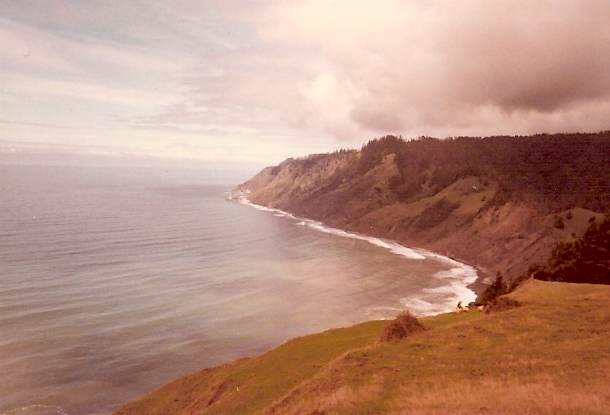
Lost Coast north of Usal Creek viewed from the ridge south of Usal

Early European settlers of this area began harvesting bark of the tanoak tree for tanning hides into leather. Bark collectors formed the small community of Kenny around springs at the headwaters of the north fork of Usal Creek. A wharf was built at Bear Harbor in 1884 for loading bark onto ships. The Bear Harbor and Eel River Railroad incorporated in 1896 to connect the wharf to a sawmill being built on the South Fork Eel River at Andersonia, California. The location of the railroad shops was named Moody for the proprietor (Louis Alton Moody) of a nearby hotel and saloon. The community of Andersonia, Anderson Gulch, and the Anderson Cliffs of the Lost Coast are named for sawmill owner Henry Neff Anderson, who was killed in a construction accident in 1905. Sawmill and railroad operation languished after Anderson's death, and the facilities were dismantled in 1921.

Usal Redwood Company built a sawmill and 1,600-foot (490 m) wharf at the mouth of Usal Creek in 1889. The company town of Usal was built around the mill and a railroad for transporting logs extended three miles up Usal Creek. A fire in 1902 destroyed the sawmill, schoolhouse, warehouse, and county bridge over Usal Creek. The railroad was dismantled; but a few structures, including a hotel, survived until destroyed by fire in 1969. Steep terrain and unfavorable coastal mooring conditions delayed timber harvesting of Jackass Creek drainage until internal combustion machinery was available for transport. The company town of Wheeler, California, was built for logging operations from 1948 to 1959. Sinkyone Wilderness State Park began acquisition of Lost Coast property in 1975.

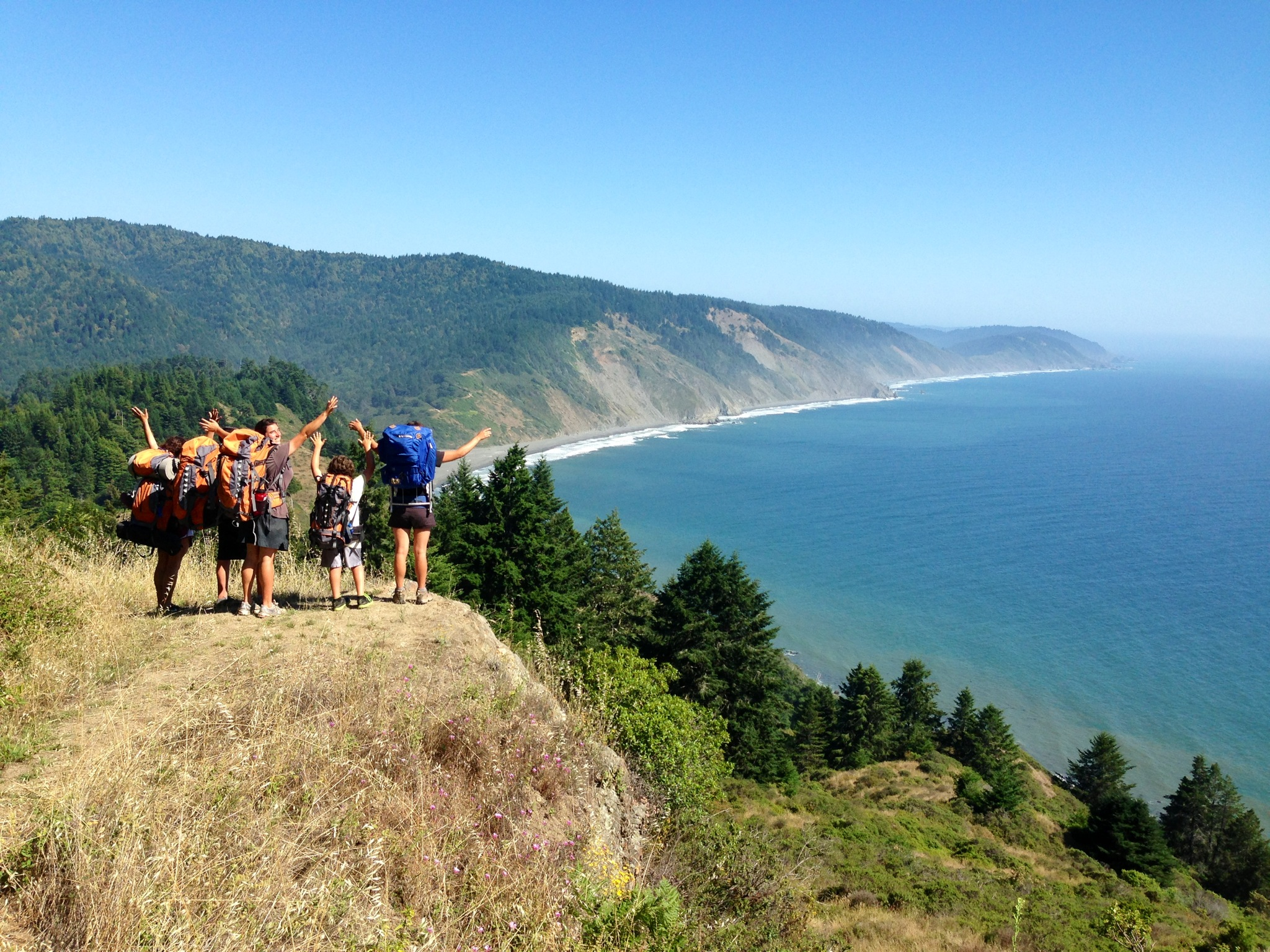
Backpackers taking in the views of California's coastline

== Transportation ==
The geology of the Lost Coast makes it difficult to establish routes through the area. State Route 1, California's Pacific Coast Highway, was originally planned to continue up the coast through the region. In 1984, admitting that such construction was not feasible, Caltrans re-routed the northern segment of Highway 1 from Rockport to Leggett and renumbered the portion that was built from Ferndale to Fernbridge as State Route 211.

Without major highways or county thoroughfares in the area, the secluded communities within the Lost Coast are only accessible by land via small mountain roads. Mattole Road runs south from Ferndale to Petrolia, while Shelter Cove Rd. and Briceland Thorn Rd. form the main route connecting Shelter Cove with US 101 to the east.

Shelter Cove Airport in Shelter Cove is a small public airport with one runway, making it possible to fly in when weather permits. Communities immediately on the coast are also accessible by boat.

== See also ==
- Lost Sierra, another remote region of Northern California
