= California State Route 211 =

Highway in California

State Route 211
- SR 211 highlighted in red

Route information
- Maintained by Caltrans
- Length: 5.395 mi (8.682 km)

Major junctions
- South end: Ocean Avenue in Ferndale
- North end: US 101 at Fernbridge

Location
- Country: United States
- State: California
- Counties: Humboldt

Highway system
- State highways in California; Interstate; US; State; Scenic; History; Pre‑1964; Unconstructed; Deleted; Freeways
← SR 210	→ SR 213

State Route 211 (SR 211) is a state highway in the U.S. state of California that connects Ferndale with U.S. 101 in Humboldt County. The highway was originally designed to be the northernmost segment of State Route 1, but after construction of the Coast Highway through the Lost Coast region was abandoned, the route to Ferndale was renumbered to SR 211.

== Route description ==
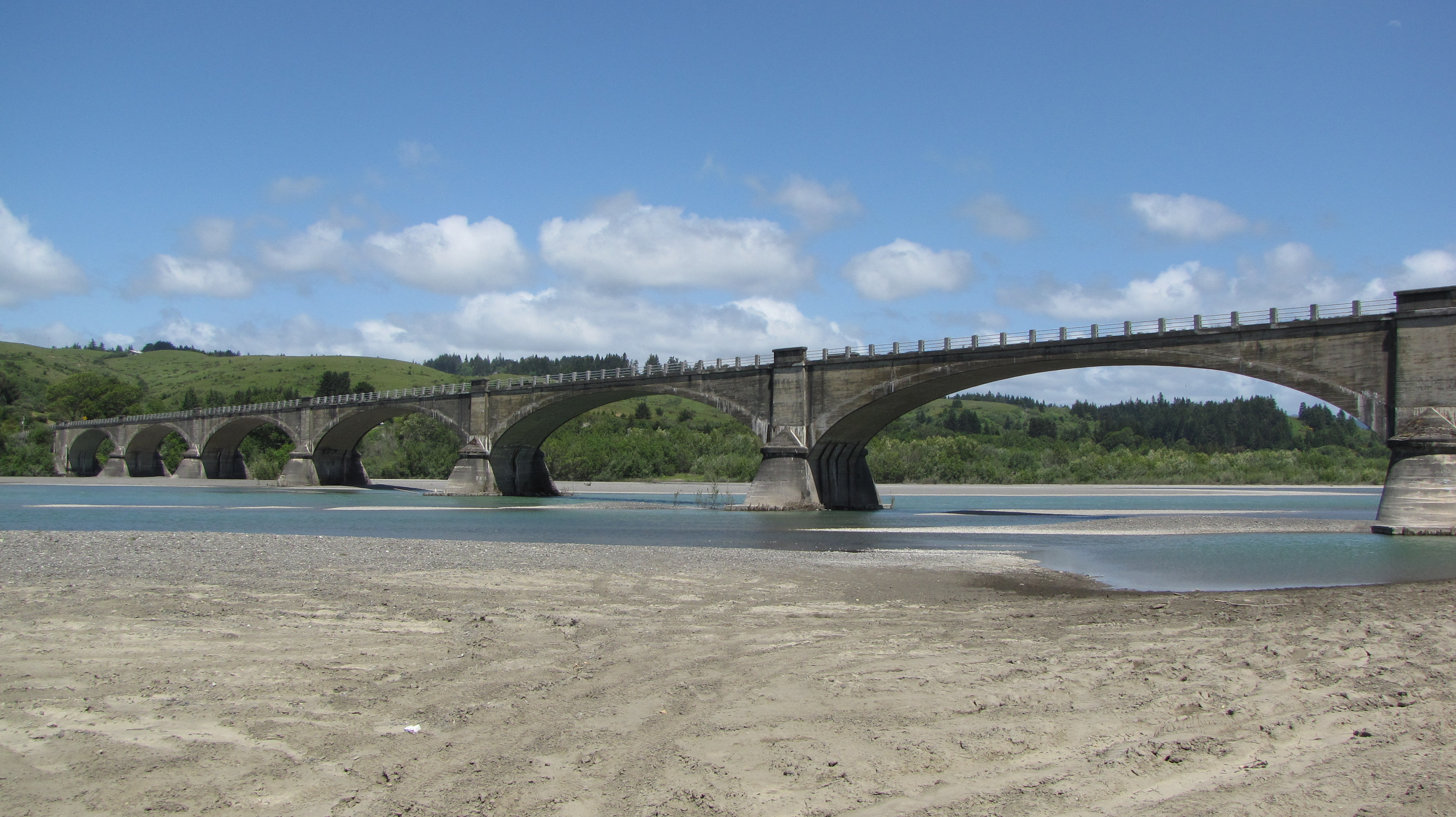
State Route 211 crossing the Eel River

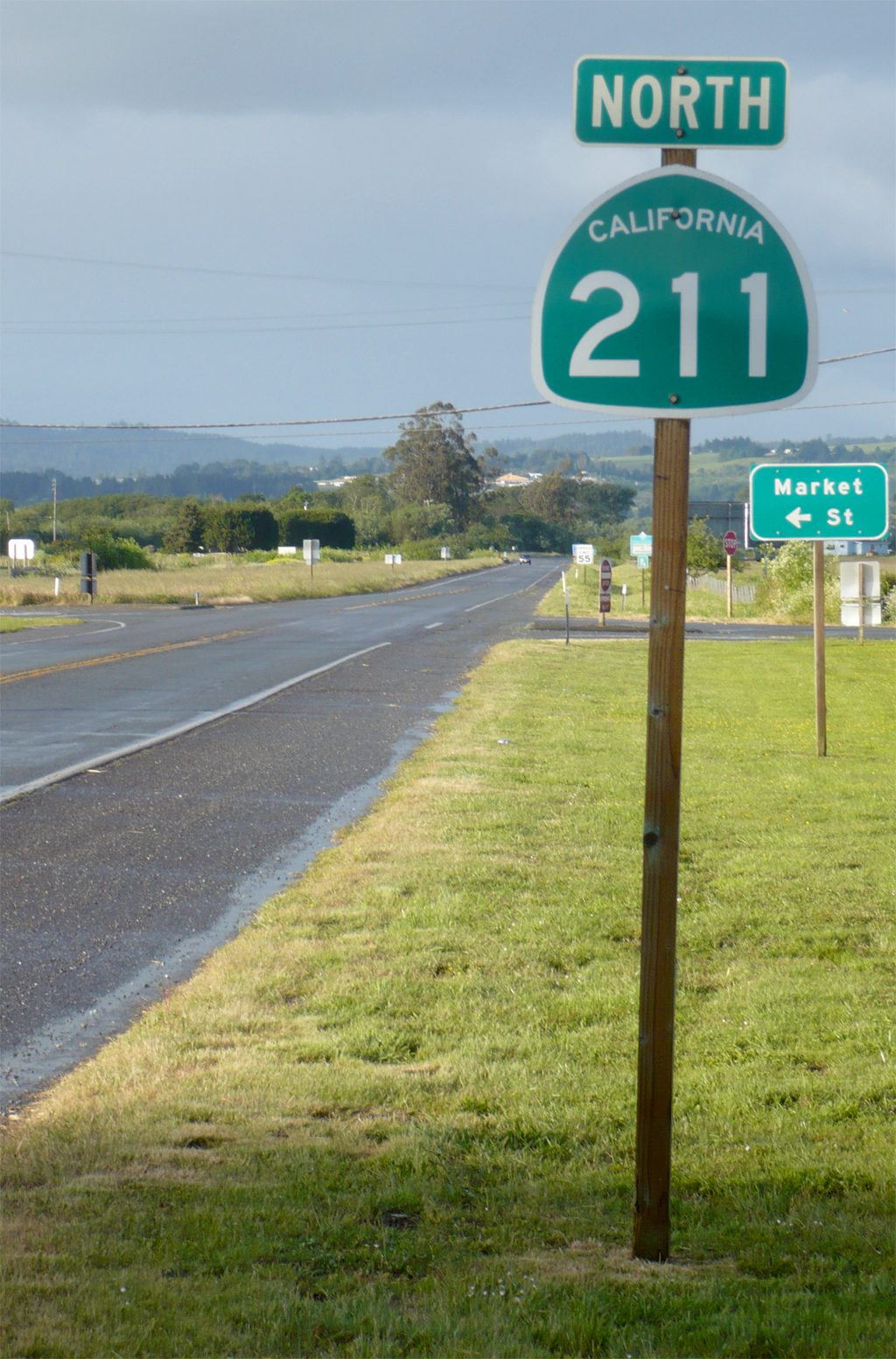
State Route 211 looking north from the city limits of Ferndale, California

Route 211 is defined in section 511 of the California Streets and Highways Code, and that the highway is "from Route 1 near Rockport to Route 101 near Fernbridge". Route 211 is not fully constructed to extend south to Route 1 as it is defined.

Route 211 runs about 5 miles (8 km) from roughly the intersection of Main Street and Ocean Avenue in Ferndale north to US 101 in Fernbridge, crossing over the bridge of the same name over the Eel River. After northbound SR 211 traffic crosses the bridge, those headed to southbound US 101 are instead instructed to turn right onto southbound Fernbridge Drive, while SR 211 continues onto northbound Fernbridge Drive to US 101.

SR 211 is part of the California Freeway and Expressway System, but is not part of the National Highway System, a network of highways that are considered essential to the country's economy, defense, and mobility by the Federal Highway Administration.

== History ==
SR 211 was originally signed as the northernmost segment of SR 1, which was intended to extend north through the Lost Coast region from Rockport to Ferndale and Fernbridge. It was then renumbered as SR 211 in 1984 after construction through the Lost Coast was abandoned; the portion of Highway 1 north of Rockport was then re-routed along the former State Route 208 to terminate with US 101 in Leggett. The remaining 103 mi (166 km) of SR 211 is unlikely ever to be constructed because of the steep and unstable highlands of the Lost Coast. The traversable route through Humboldt and Mendocino Counties is Chemise Mountain Road, Wilder Ridge Road, and Mattole Road, but these remain small mountain roads.

The former SR 211 designation was used from 1964 to 1965 for a segment of present-day California State Route 155.

== Major intersections ==
Except where prefixed with a letter, postmiles were measured on the road as it was when the route was established, based on the alignment that existed at the time, and do not necessarily reflect current mileage. Postmile prefixes include: R reflecting a realignment in the route since then, M indicating a second realignment, L referring to an overlap due to a correction or change, and T indicating postmiles classified as temporary. Segments that remain unconstructed or have been relinquished to local control may be omitted. The entire route is in Humboldt County.

Location	Postmile	Destinations	Notes
Ferndale	73.20	Ocean Avenue – Petrolia	South end of SR 211; road continues as Francis Street
Ferndale	R74.19	Van Ness Avenue	
	R75.78	Coffee Creek Road, Sage Road	
	R76.69	Goble Lane	
	78.10	Fernbridge over the Eel River	
Fernbridge	78.59	Fernbridge Drive – Fortuna	Connects to US 101 south
Fernbridge	79.16	US 101 – Eureka, Fortuna	Interchange; north end of SR 211; US 101 exit 692
1.000 mi = 1.609 km; 1.000 km = 0.621 mi
