= Wheeler, California =

Unincorporated community in California, United States

Wheeler
- Unincorporated community
- Location in California Wheeler (the United States)
- Coordinates: 39°53′08″N 123°54′40″W
- Country: United States
- State: California
- County: Mendocino
- Elevation: 43 ft (13 m)

Wheeler was a company town in Mendocino County, California, United States. Located 8.5 miles (14 km) southwest of Piercy, at an elevation of 43 feet (13 m), it was built adjacent to Jackass Creek for logging operations in 1948 and survived until 1959. Sinkyone Wilderness State Park acquired the Lost Coast property after 1975. No structures remain at the location, now used as a campground.
