= Crystal Creamery =

American dairy company

- Formerly: Foster Farms Dairy
- Industry: Dairy
- Founded: 1901
- Founder: George Knox
- Headquarters: Modesto, California
- Website: www.crystalcreamery.com

Crystal Creamery was founded in 1901 by George Knox in Sacramento, California, as Crystal Cream & Butter. In 1921, Crystal Cream & Butter was purchased by Carl Hansen, a Danish immigrant. The Hansen family led the company for the next 86 years and pioneered many new technologies, growing Crystal Cream & Butter into one of the largest independent dairy processors in the state of California. In 2007, Crystal Cream & Butter was acquired by HP Hood, who sold it later that year to Foster Dairy Farms, which had been founded in 1941 by Max and Verna Foster, a venture that followed the 1939 founding of their Foster Farms. Today, Crystal Creamery claims to be the "largest privately owned dairy in California."

In 2008, Foster Farms Dairy announced its intention to rebrand itself as Crystal Creamery. In 2009, Foster Farms Dairy acquired Humboldt Creamery, based in Fernbridge, California (near Eureka). The name change was phased in from 2009 to 2012. Crystal Creamery's 120th Anniversary was celebrated in 2021.

== See also ==
- Dairy farming
