= Humboldt Creamery =

Milk processing facility in Fernbridge, California

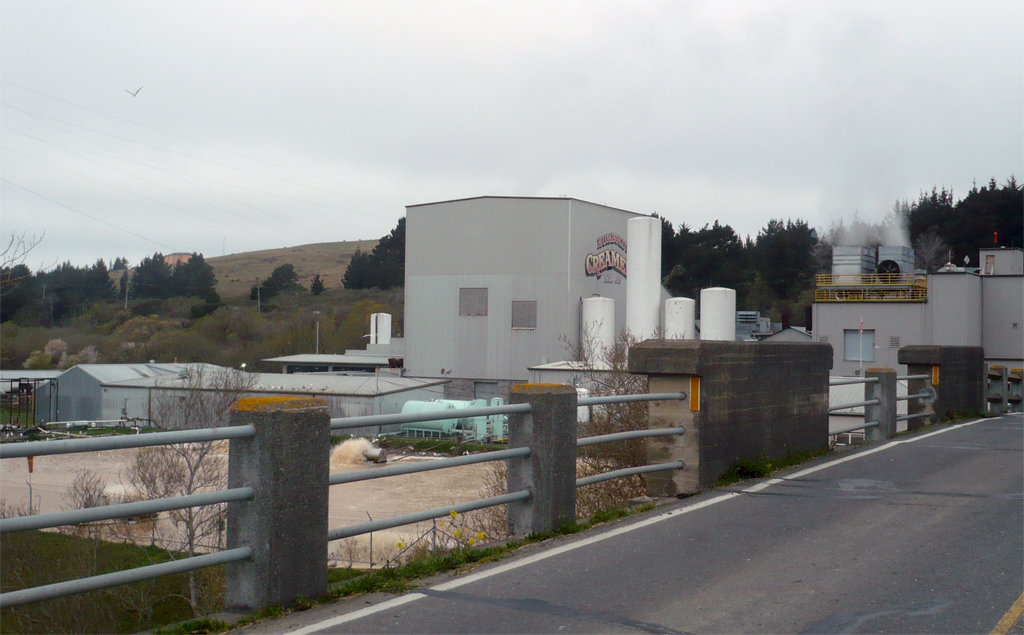
- Humboldt Creamery buildings seen from Fernbridge (2012)
- Type: Agricultural
- Industry: Dairy and Food Processing
- Founded: 1929
- Founder: Peter Phlipsen
- Headquarters: Fortuna, California, United States
- Products: Ice Cream and other Dairy products
- Parent: Foster Farms Dairy
- Website: humboldtcreamery.com

Humboldt Creamery was formerly an agricultural marketing cooperative located on the California North Coast. It is now owned by Foster Farms Dairy of Modesto, California.

== History ==
The co-op produced as much as 10 million gallons of ice cream annually in addition to milk, butter, cheese, and other products under its own label and a variety of other labels, and was the sole producer of Costco premium ice cream. This contract and purchases in 2004 of several other ice cream companies made it one of the largest ice cream producers in the western United States. The co-op originally provided fresh milk for local markets, and converted production in excess of local demand to butter and powdered milk for export. Production shifted from butter to ice cream when butter prices dropped following the collapse of the Soviet Union. The organic label and related regional success helped the company prepare to go national in marketing at the end of 2008, at which time it was owned 75 percent by local farmers and 25 percent by Dairy Farmers of America.

Financial problems came to light after the abrupt resignation of 12-year veteran CEO Rich Ghilarducci on February 20, 2009. Bankruptcy was filed two months later, resulting in the sale of assets of the Humboldt Creamery at auction on August 27, 2009, to Foster Farms Dairy for $19.25 million. The former CEO pleaded guilty to changing the values of the Creamery's receivables and payables for three years between 2005 and 2008. He was sentenced to 30 months in Federal prison and ordered to pay $7 million in restitution for a "single count of making false statements to an agricultural credit bank".

The bankruptcy proceedings and sale resulted in many changes for the company. Primary storage and production facilities remained at the original site in Fernbridge, California, and frozen products were still based in a Stockton, California, facility. However, under order of the Santa Rosa, California bankruptcy court, a more recently acquired facility in Los Angeles and older property located in Loleta, California, were divided off for separate sale.

The operation and all of its products had always been free of synthetic or added rbST hormone.

== See also ==
- Dairy farming
