= Fernbridge (bridge) =

Bridge in California, United States

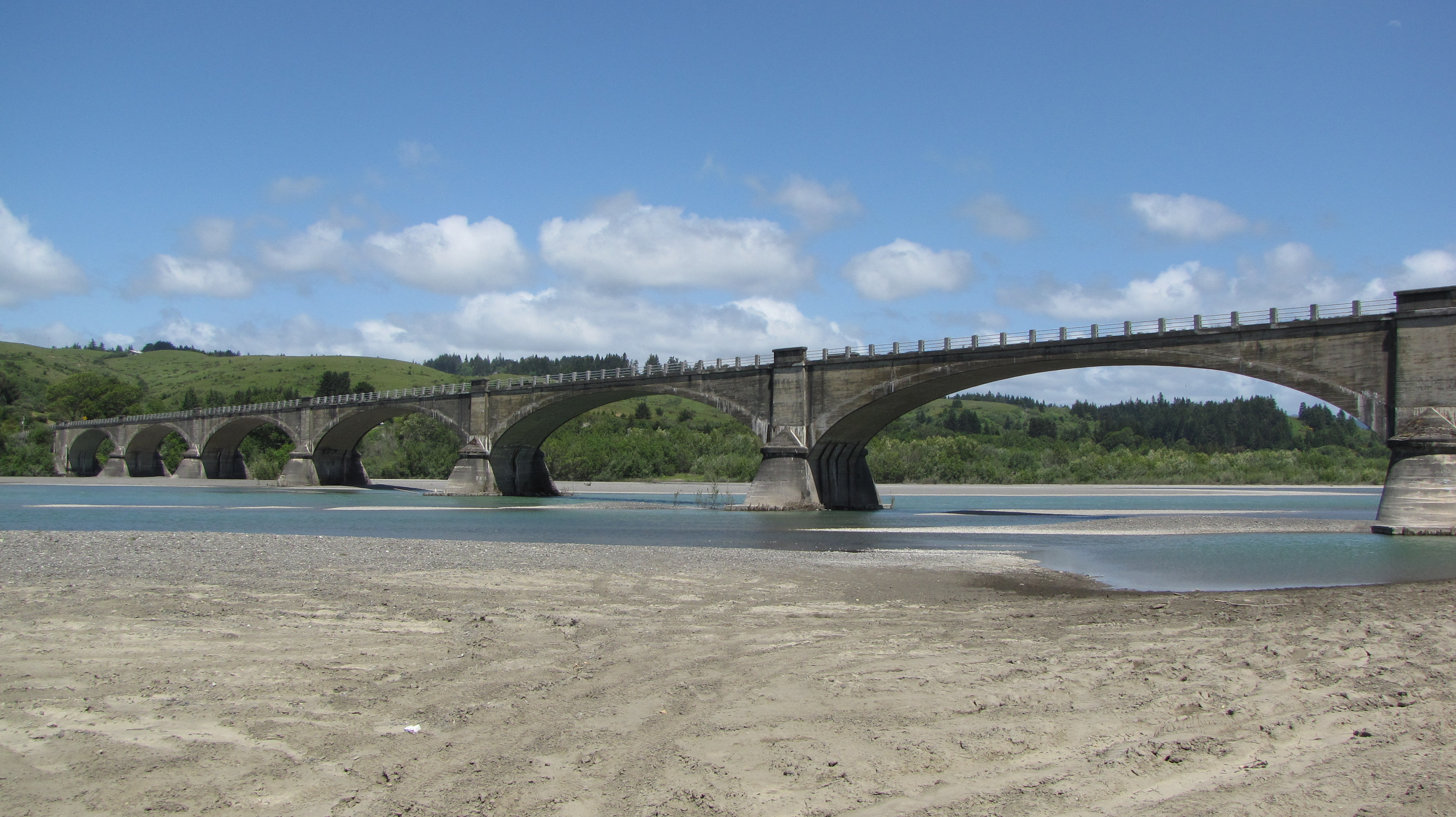
- Partial view of the west side of Fernbridge as seen from the south bank of the Eel River
- Coordinates: 40°36′51″N 124°12′8″W
- Carries: SR 211
- Crosses: Eel River
- Locale: Fernbridge, California
- Other name: originally Eel River Bridge
- Maintained by: California Department of Transportation

Characteristics
- Design: Arch bridge
- Material: Reinforced concrete
- Total length: 1,320 ft (402.3 m)
- No. of spans: 7
- Piers in water: 8 during periods of high water
- No. of lanes: 2

History
- Designer: John B. Leonard
- Constructed by: Pacific Construction (of San Francisco)
- Built: November 8, 1911
- Construction start: March 20, 1910
- Construction end: November 8, 1911
- Construction cost: US$245,967 (equivalent to $8,043,000 in 2023)
- Opened: November 8, 1911
- Replaces: an old ferry crossing

Statistics
- Daily traffic: 5650 (in 2022)
- Fernbridge
- U.S. National Register of Historic Places
- Area: 1.4 acres (0.6 ha)
- NRHP reference No.: 87000566
- Added to NRHP: April 2, 1987

Location
- Interactive map of Fernbridge

Fernbridge, originally Eel River Bridge, is a 1,320-foot-long (402.3 m) reinforced concrete arch bridge designed by American engineer John B. Leonard which opened on November 8, 1911 at the site of an earlier ferry crossing of the Eel River. Fernbridge is the last crossing before the Eel arrives at the Pacific Ocean, and anchors one end of California State Route 211 leading to Ferndale, California. When built, it was referred to as the "Queen of Bridges" and is still the longest functional poured concrete bridge in operation in the world.

== Construction ==
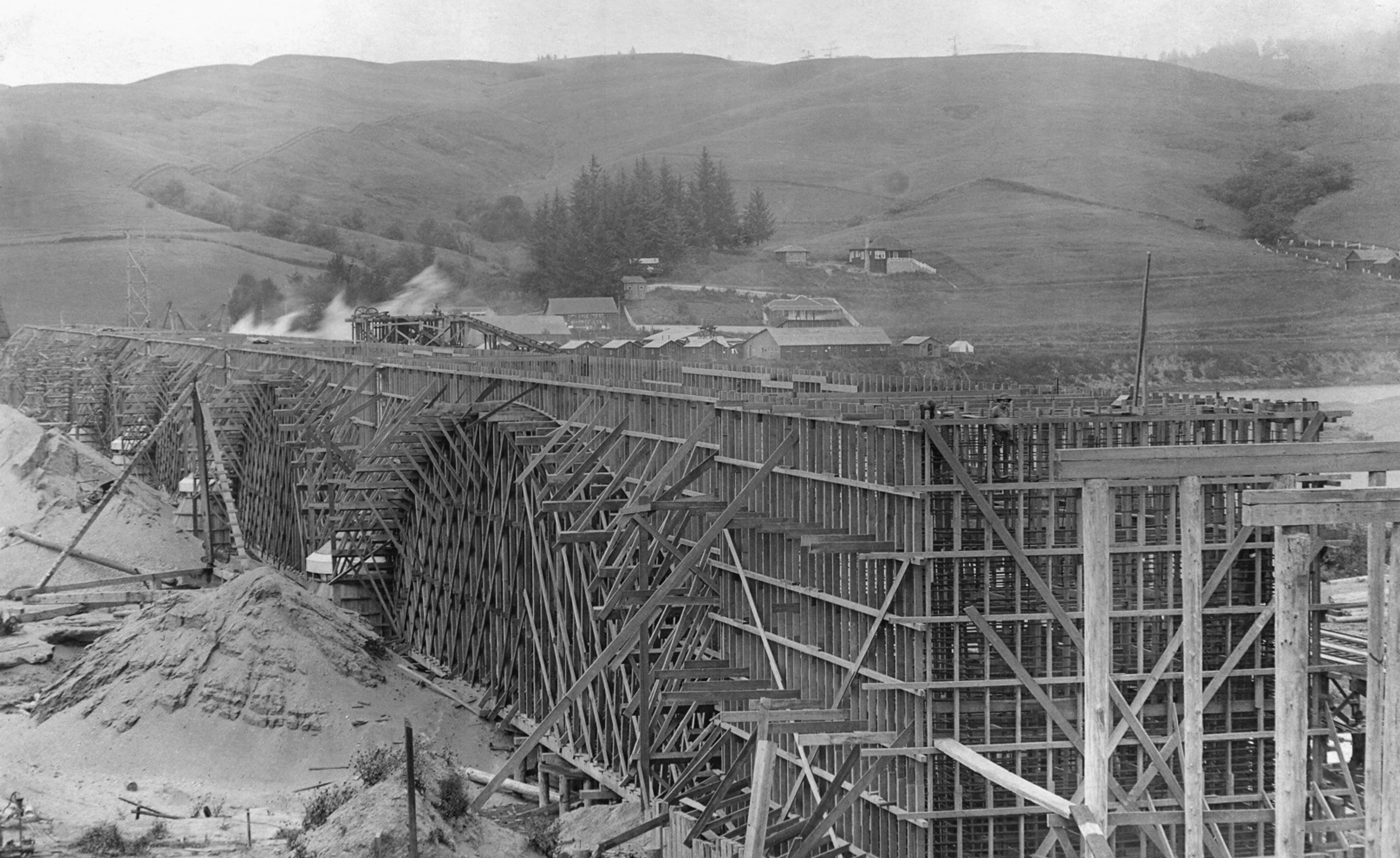
Fernbridge framing in 1911

"It was generally believed that Eel River could not be bridged because its course changed so often." Nevertheless, in 1909 the decision was taken to build a bridge at the Singley ferry crossing. After 17 years of petitioning by Eel River valley residents, Humboldt County Supervisors accepted bids for construction in 1910, and work started March 20 of that year. The bridge is constructed of reinforced concrete because studies after the 1906 San Francisco earthquake showed that reinforced concrete withstood earthquakes. The nearly one-quarter-mile (0.4 km) span cost US$245,967 (equivalent to $8,499,000 in 2025) to build, and consumed millions of board feet of local redwood timber for the framing. Construction was finished and the bridge put into operation on November 8, 1911. As completed, the bridge had wooden trestle approach spans 500 feet (150 m) and 551 feet (168 m) long. The reinforced concrete structure was 1,451 feet (442 m) long overall with a 24-foot (7.3 m) wide roadway carried on seven 180-foot (55 m) long arches. The original wooden approaches were replaced with the current concrete ramps in 1920 or 1918. The south approach was again replaced in 1956 due to the flooding of 1955.

== Floods ==
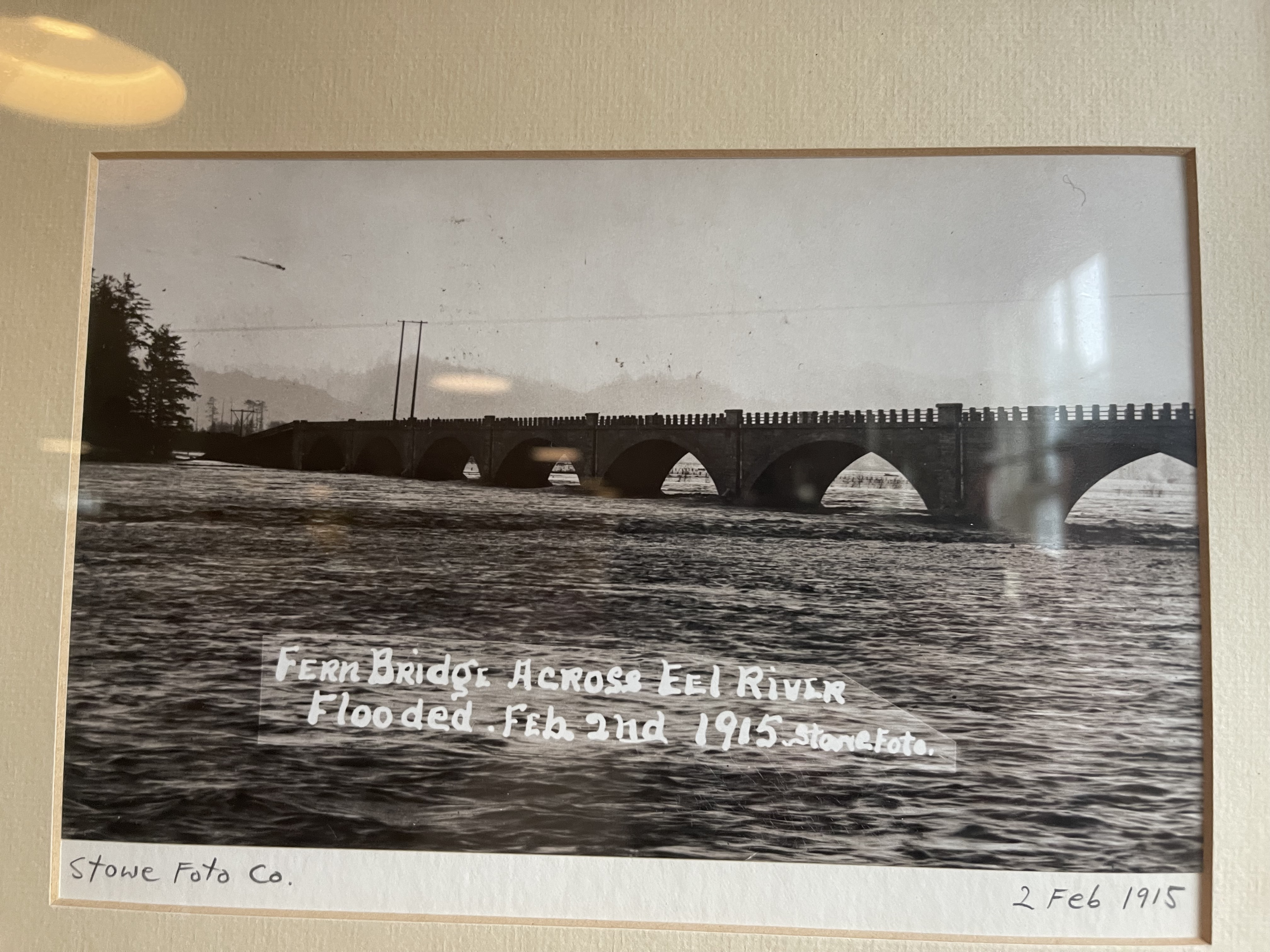
1915 Eel River flood at Fernbridge

The bridge survived floods in 1912, 1913, 1914, 1915, 1937, 1953, 1955, 1964 and 1986. In the 1955 Christmas Week flood, the flood waters measured 27.7 feet (8.4 m) deep at Fernbridge. The south side abutment was washed out, and the approach damaged. During repairs the first end span was removed and an earthen embankment was built which shortened the bridge by about 20 feet (6.1 m).

Nine years later during the Christmas flood of 1964, every stream gauge on the Eel River was either inundated and useless or destroyed except the one at Fernbridge and nearly every bridge on the Eel River was badly damaged because the force of the water was aided by thousands of redwood logs stacked for winter mill production along the bank of the river as well as homes and barns swept away by the rapidly rising waters. The flood peak at Fernbridge occurred at 4:00 a.m. on December 23 when the flood level was 29.5 feet (9.0 m). The waters stayed high for 24 hours, and the discharge was estimated to be in excess of 800,000 cubic feet per second (20,000 m^{3}/s). A large island which had built itself upstream of the bridge was washed away in the wake of the 1964 floods.

== Historic designation ==
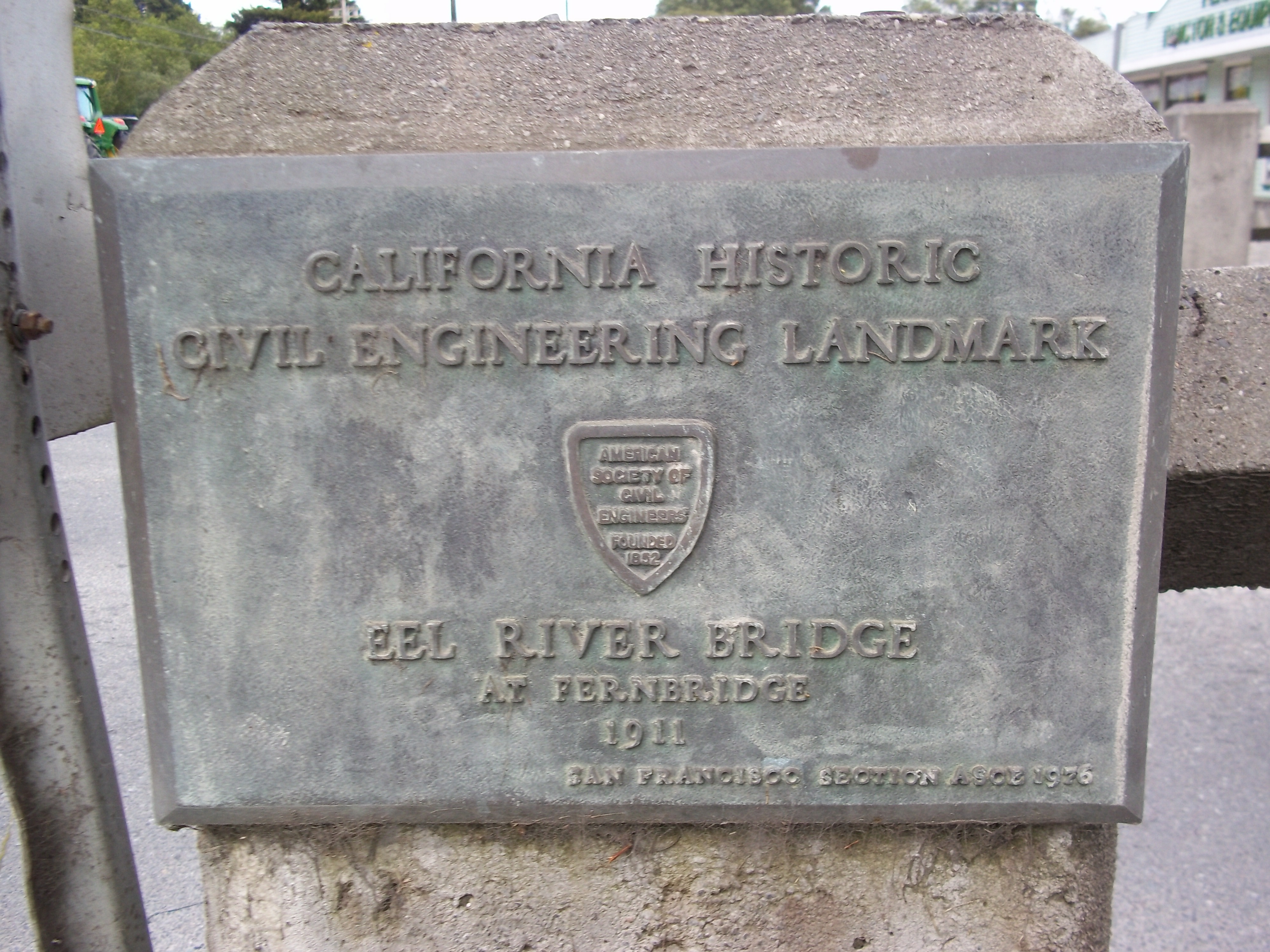
American Society of Civil Engineers Fernbridge plaque

On September 24, 1976, the American Society of Civil Engineers designated Fernbridge as an historic civil engineering landmark and installed a plaque on the northwest approach pylon to the bridge.

In 1987, the California Department of Transportation (Caltrans) recommended studying the removal of Fernbridge and replacement with a more modern span, such as the many which have washed into the Eel River during floods which Fernbridge withstood. The Eel River regularly floods Fernbridge to the tops of the lower ridge of the support. In some high flood years, photographs have been taken showing the water level over the upper cone-shaped tops of the support pillars as well as valley-wide flooding in 1915. Residents of Ferndale successfully campaigned to stop any changes to the historic bridge. Fernbridge was added to the National Register of Historic Places on April 2, 1987.

== Recent events ==
In 1995, Fernbridge served as the set for scenes in the movie Outbreak, where a string of U.S. Army tanks rolls across the bridge accompanied by low-flying assault helicopters. In 2008, Caltrans initiated restoration of the railings of Fernbridge to their original appearance. Additional small improvements were made in 2008 and 2009, but Fernbridge's general appearance remains unchanged.

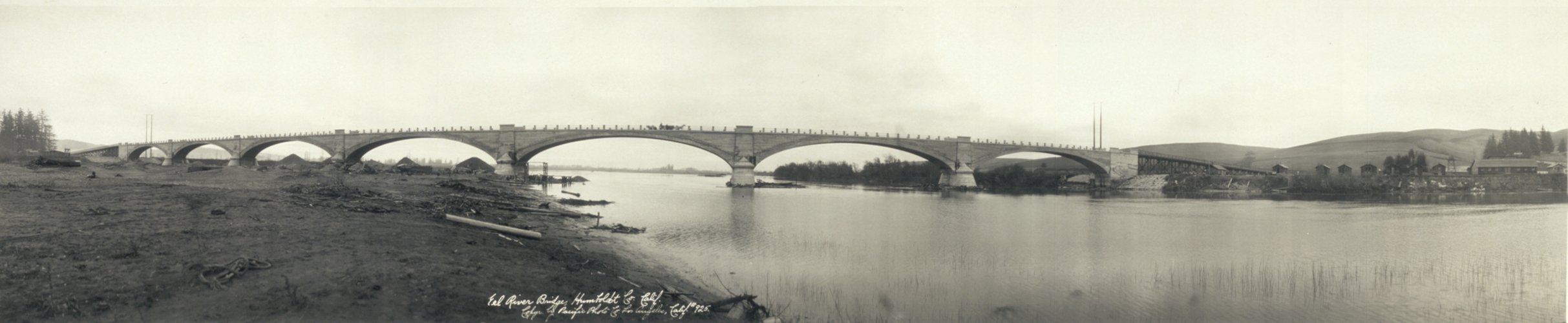
Fernbridge bridge circa 1912, showing all seven spans. Each arch is 180 feet long.

For the 100th anniversary celebration on August 7, 2011, a ceremony was held, the bridge was closed to vehicular traffic, a run over and back was held as was done on opening day in 1911, a parade of historic vehicles and local dignitaries crossed over, and a Ferndale resident borrowed construction lights and lit it at night. The Ferndale Museum produced a video related to the bridge and exhibits information about its history.

The United States Geological Survey maintains a live webcam at Fernbridge near their stream gauge to visually monitor stream conditions.

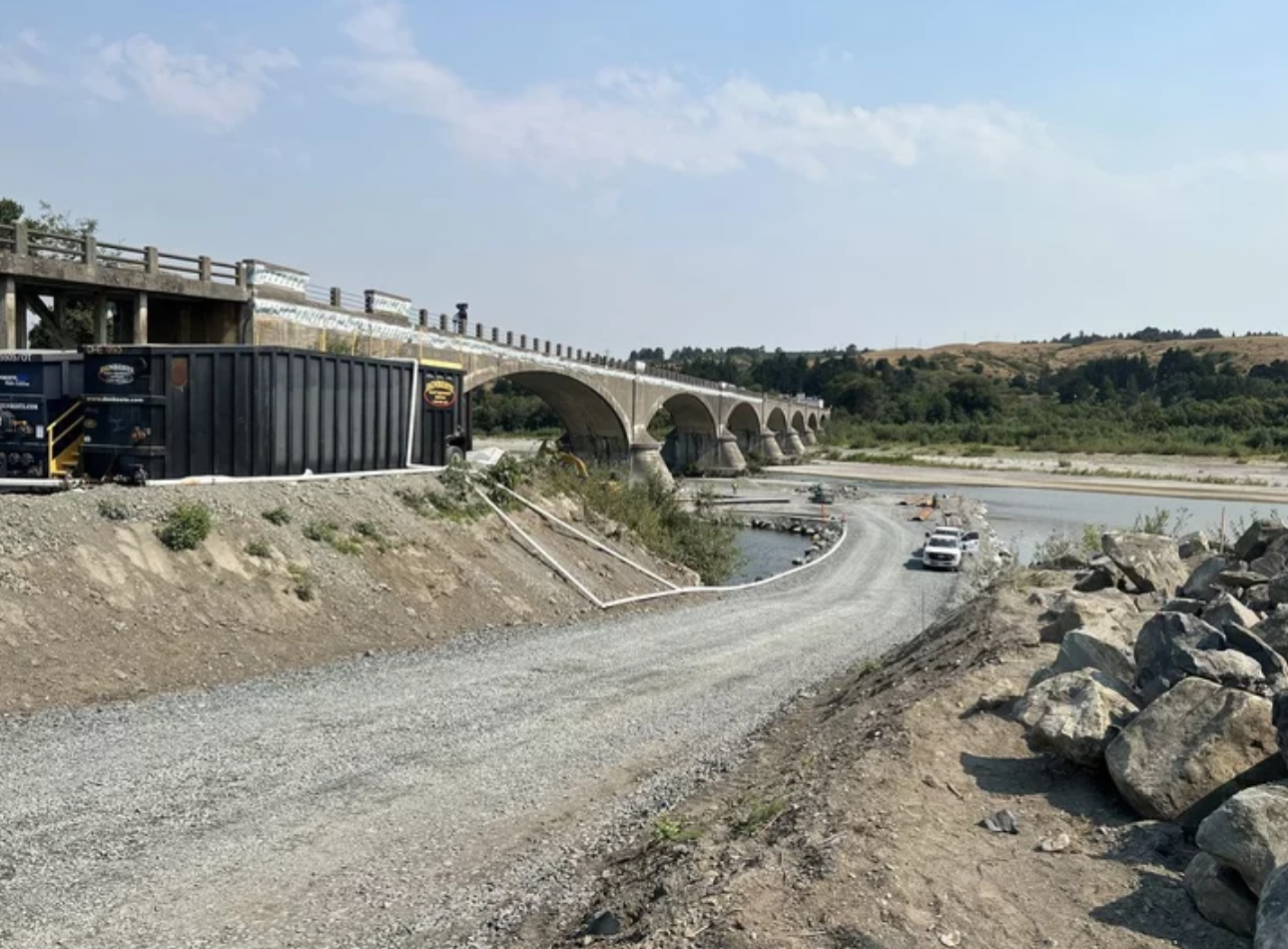
Fernbridge repairs in 2023 following the earthquake of December 2022 included concrete reinforcement of bridge pier 2

On December 20, 2022, an earthquake damaged the bridge, and the California Highway Patrol temporarily closed it to all traffic for a few weeks. The bridge was repaired to allow two-way traffic by March 2023 however additional work occurred in summer through autumn 2023 to fill undermined areas at pier 2 and repair a vertical crack in the pier. The total repair cost was estimated to have been $26 million in March 2024. The repairs were announced by Caltrans as complete in March 2025 with no known safety issues or threats.

In March 2024, Caltrans announced that seismic gates would be installed at each end of the bridge in the summer of 2024 which would lower when an earthquake of magnitude 5.6 was detected at the bridge. In December 2024, the date for installation of the gates was announced to be spring or summer of 2025. This date was later moved to autumn 2025 and then to summer 2026.

The deaths of two dogs after swimming in the river near Fernbridge occurred on September 5, 2024, due to cyanobacteria in blue-green algae which is known to happen during times of warm weather and low water flow.

The bridge was scheduled to have one lane closed on January 13, 2026, to allow Caltrans to verify sensor readings that detected a half-inch movement due to December flooding. Despite this, Caltrans had assessed the bridge to be safe following the detected movement.

== Need for a New Bridge or Rehabilitation of the Existing Bridge ==
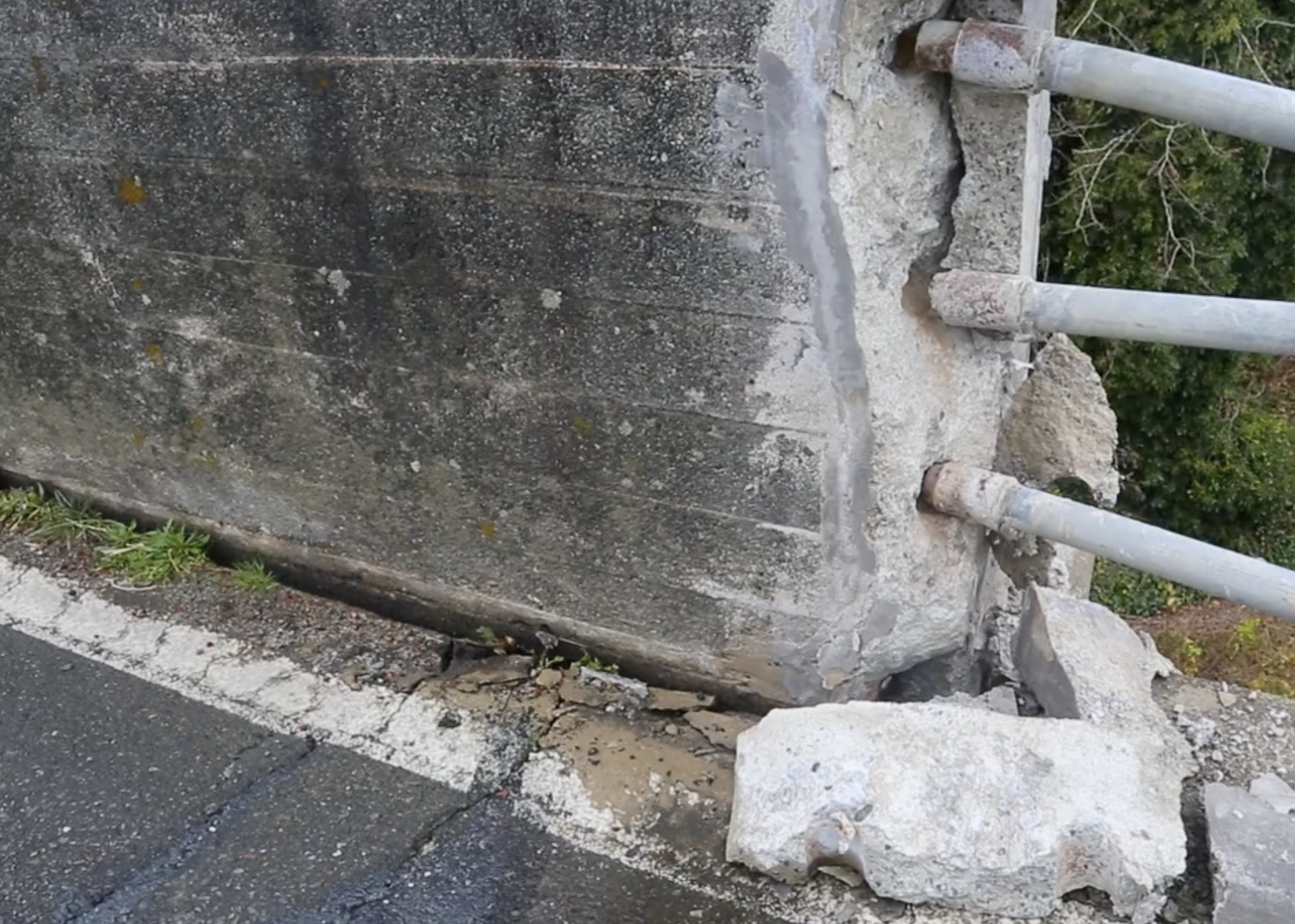
Earthquake damage to guard rails on Fernbridge in 2022; while this and other damage has been repaired, other costly and more extensive wear, especially related to water scouring at bridge piers and embankments, is in need of rehabilitation (or replacement) according to the California Department of Transportation.

Matching concerns from an 1854 survey, the Eel River's path continues to move which creates scouring problems at Fernbridge and elsewhere. A 1996 evaluation found that the bridge foundations are unstable for the scour conditions. A 2021 inspection found Fernbridge is vulnerable to scour with potential depths to 30 feet. In 2017, following decades of south bank erosion, water washed out the south embankment at Abutment 1, flooded the roadway, and added to the upstream bank erosion, prompting emergency scour mitigation. A rock buttress embedded with Large Woody Debris was installed to slow erosion at Abutment 1. The roadway again flooded in 2019, adding to embankment retreat upstream of the temporary rock protection placed in 2017. There remains a pending recommendation to protect 2,500 feet of the south bank from erosion with rock slope protection or spurs in addition to proposed pier scour mitigation for piers 2–7. In December 2020, an underwater inspection found exposed pile caps at piers 2–7. A more detailed review of the pile cap of pier 2 found 40 piles exposed six to seven feet below the cap. Vertical cracks in piers 2–7 have been noted since at least 2014 that are heavy and extend 10–30 feet high. On December 20, 2022, a 6.4-magnitude earthquake struck 12 miles to the southwest of the bridge causing widespread damage to the bridge. A bridge Inspection reported exposed and buckled steel reinforcement in the girders, bent caps and bent columns of the approach spans, and growth of the large vertical cracks in the piers and the arches. While some of these issues have been addressed recently at a cost of $26 million, the overall condition of the bridge, according to the California Department of Transportation (Caltrans), requires either substantial additional rehabilitation of the existing structure or the construction of a new bridge.

By mid 2023, the future construction of a new bridge or rehabilitation of the existing bridge was being contemplated by Caltrans with an estimated cost between $200 million and $500 million with a refined estimate of costs as of July 2025 of $214 million to $355 million. In June 2025, Caltrans reported that among the seven alternatives under consideration, their preferred option would be to build a new bridge "on the Fortuna side of the current bridge" with work beginning in 2032 and completing in 2036 costing approximately $237 million (reported as $214 million in July 2025 and then $220 million in March 2026). The new bridge would accommodate vehicular traffic, foot traffic, and bicycles. If a new bridge is built, the plans call for two twelve-foot traffic lanes, two eight-foot shoulders, and one six-foot separated (from traffic) pedestrian path. If the existing bridge is rehabilitated, it would have two eleven-foot four-inch traffic lanes and no shoulders or pedestrian path. Under Caltrans' preferred plan, the current bridge would remain as a monument but would receive no maintenance once the new bridge was placed into service. In August 2025, $4.4 million was allocated by Caltrans to further study a replacement bridge. A final decision on the design and exact location of the bridge was expected to be made in spring 2029 with construction beginning in 2032 depending upon the construction alternative to be chosen.
