= Reynolds Wayside Campground =

Protected area in Mendocino County, California

- Location within California
- Location: Mendocino County, California, US
- Coordinates: 39°56′40″N 123°46′46″W
- Created: 1966
- Operator: California Department of Parks and Recreation

Reynolds Wayside Campground is a state park in Mendocino County, California, United States. The site, which contained a redwood grove, was purchased by Frank W. Reynolds and his wife in 1928 and converted into a resort known as Reynolds Redwood Flat in 1930. After Mr. Reynolds died in 1962, the site was leased until the California state government purchased it in 1966 as a memorial to Reynolds and to protect it from logging. Under state management, 50 campsites were constructed at the site, which was renamed to Reynolds State Recreation Area before taking its present name. In 1976, the campsites were removed, and the property was deemed surplus the next year. Much of the site's land was exchanged with a timber company for territory at Sinkyone Wilderness State Park in 1984. As of May 2021, Reynolds Wayside Campground contains 38 acres (15 ha) of land, including area for hiking and access to the Eel River.

== History ==
Frank W. Reynolds, later a California forestry board member from 1941 to 1955, purchased the site in 1928 due to its natural beauty. Consisting of 419 acres (170 ha) with frontage on the highway and property on both sides of the Eel River, the area included 97 acres (39 ha) of virgin redwood forest. In 1930, Reynolds and his wife constructed a resort known as Reynolds Redwood Flat at the site. Structures at the resort included 24 cabins, a two-story building, and a home for the Reynoldses. Mr. Reynolds died in April 1962, and the site was leased after his death. In April 1965, the state forestry board approved a resolution to create a memorial to Reynolds. Mrs. Reynolds offered to sell Reynolds Redwood Flat to the state at a discount, and the forestry board noted that it would consider the preservation of the property as a memorial. California State Senator Frank S. Petersen introduced a bill to purchase 412 acres (167 ha) of the site, but the California division of parks and beaches objected. The division had already set a policy of preserving redwood trees through expanding existing sites, rather than establishing new ones. The state also stated that a planned freeway would cut through the site, but Petersen objected and stated that the roadway would only affect one edge of Reynolds Redwood Flat.

After logging interests sought to buy the property, California Public Works purchased the site to preserve it. The government purchase was the result of a bill sponsored by state legislators Petersen and Frank P. Belotti. The Redwood Empire Association was credited by the Daily Independent Journal of San Rafael, California. The purchase price was reported to be $230,000 for the land as well as $50,000 from the California Division of Highways to acquire right of way for roads. An April 26, 1966, article in the Ukiah Daily Journal reported that the purchase encompassed 419 acres with highway access and land on both sides of the Eel River, while a May 13, 1966, article in the Daily Independent Journal stated that the purchase only consisted of 375 acres (152 ha) between the highway and the river. After the purchase, the Redwoods Empire Association proposed preserving several of the buildings at the site and establishing a redwoods museum there.

In 1967, the property, which had access from U.S. Route 101, was renamed to Reynolds State Recreation Area and designated for use as a recreational site. That same year, 50 overnight campsites were added to the site. The park included amenities such as tables, stoves, and toilets, and carried a $1 per night fee. A private party operated concessions and souvenir facilities. By 1969, USGS topographic maps identified the site as Reynolds State Wayside Campground. The campsites were removed in 1976, and the site was declared surplus in 1977. The Mendocino County Board of Supervisors declined to purchase 270 acres (110 ha) of the surplus land later that year, preferring to see the land return to eligibility for property taxes. In 1983, a bill created by state legislator Dan Hauser proposed exchanging 350 acres (140 ha) of land at the site, now known as Reynolds Wayside Campground, with Georgia-Pacific for 136 acres (55 ha) at Sinkyone Wilderness State Park and the construction of a hiking trail. The bill was opposed by preservationists who feared that Georgia-Pacific would log the redwood forest. The exchange was set by 1984 and was for 130.7 acres (52.9 ha) to be transferred from Rex Timber, Inc. (a subsidiary of Georgia-Pacific) to the Sinkyone site in exchange for 310 acres (130 ha) at Reynolds Wayside Campground. As of May 2021, Reynolds Wayside Campground consists of 38 acres (15 ha). There is limited parking at the site, and hiking is allowed and access to the Eel River is provided. Camping is now prohibited.
