= Cummings, Mendocino County, California =

Unincorporated community in the United States

Cummings
- Unincorporated community
- Location in California Cummings (the United States)
- Coordinates: 39°50′00″N 123°37′55″W
- Country: United States
- State: California
- County: Mendocino
- Elevation: 1,329 ft (405 m)

Cummings is an unincorporated community in Mendocino County, California, United States. It is located near U.S. Route 101 on Rattlesnake Creek, 5 miles (8 km) east-southeast of Leggett, at an elevation of 1,329 feet (405 m).

The Cummings post office opened in 1888, closed in 1899, and re-opened the following year. The post office ultimately closed in 1960. The community's name honors Jonathan Cummings, an early settler.

== Climate ==
Climate data for Cummings, California
Month	Jan	Feb	Mar	Apr	May	Jun	Jul	Aug	Sep	Oct	Nov	Dec	Year
Mean daily maximum °F (°C)	53 (12)	55 (13)	59 (15)	63 (17)	69 (21)	77 (25)	87 (31)	87 (31)	84 (29)	73 (23)	60 (16)	52 (11)	68 (20)
Mean daily minimum °F (°C)	35 (2)	34 (1)	36 (2)	38 (3)	42 (6)	48 (9)	52 (11)	51 (11)	48 (9)	41 (5)	38 (3)	34 (1)	41 (5)
Average precipitation inches (mm)	14.26 (362)	10.78 (274)	9.04 (230)	4.48 (114)	2.19 (56)	0.71 (18)	0.05 (1.3)	0.20 (5.1)	0.80 (20)	4.61 (117)	9.08 (231)	14.05 (357)	70.25 (1,785.4)
Average snowfall inches (cm)	3.4 (8.6)	1.4 (3.6)	0.6 (1.5)	0.1 (0.25)	0.0 (0.0)	0.0 (0.0)	0.0 (0.0)	0.0 (0.0)	0.0 (0.0)	0.0 (0.0)	0.1 (0.25)	1.2 (3.0)	6.8 (17.2)
Source: NOAA
