= Rockport, California =

Unincorporated community in California, United States

Rockport
- Former settlement
- Location in California Rockport (the United States)
- Coordinates: 39°44′20″N 123°48′58″W
- Country: United States
- State: California
- County: Mendocino
- Elevation: 30 ft (9 m)

Rockport (formerly, Cottoneva) is a former settlement in an unincorporated area of Mendocino County, California, United States. It is located 7.25 miles (12 km) north-northwest of Westport, at an elevation of 30 feet (9 m).

Rockport started as a small company town serving the timber industry on the Pacific Ocean coast among redwood forests in Northern California. Rockport is regarded as the southern end of the Lost Coast region; it is where State Highway 1, which runs very close along the coast for most of its length, instead turns inland before merging with U.S. Route 101 at Leggett.

== History ==
Around 1877, William R. Miller constructed the first sawmill at Rockport, then called Cottoneva. The mill boasted a double circular saw, edger, and planer, with the mill having a capacity of 20,000 board feet (1,700 ft^{3} or 50 m^{3}) of lumber per day. An unusual aspect of the site was a 270-foot (80 m) wire suspension bridge, built in 1877 to connect the mainland to a small island in the ocean. Ships bound for San Francisco and other ports would call at this island, sometimes called Pelican Island, to pick up the milled lumber, which would be brought across the bridge from the mainland by train.

Miller sold his mill in 1886 to the Cottoneva Lumber Company, who lost the mill to fire in 1900. Around 1907, the New York and Pennsylvania lumber Company acquired Cottoneva and built a new mill destroyed by fire in 1912. Between 1924 and 1926, the Finkbine-Guild Lumber Company from Jackson, Mississippi modernized the town and built a new electric sawmill and a logging railroad. They abandoned operations in 1927 and, facing financial ruin, their assets were acquired by the Great Southern Lumber Company of Bogalusa, Louisiana to form the Southern Redwood Company. After a decade of bankruptcy, the mill reopened in 1938 as the Rockport Redwood Company (a subsidiary of an association of Kansas and Oklahoma lumber retailers headed by Ralph Rounds.) The railroad was dismantled in 1939. The sawmill burned again in September 1942, but reopened in July 1943. Rough-cut lumber was trucked to Fort Bragg, California, for shipment over the California Western Railroad. Rounds built a lumber seasoning yard and finishing plant in Cloverdale, California in 1948.

When its sawmill closed for the last time in 1957, Rockport was a town of about 500 people with a company store, a community town hall, and a company doctor, as well as employee housing. A post office operated at Rockport from 1888 to 1903, from 1926 to 1934, and from 1938 to 1957. The town hall was also used for dances, a movie theater, and local plays. There was also a grade school that went from grades 1 thru 6. As the school house only had three classrooms, each room had two grades: 1st and 2nd grade in one classroom, 3rd and 4th in another, and 5th and 6th in the other. Seventh graders and higher were bused to Leggett Valley High School. As of 1997 the old schoolhouse was still standing. It is the only building left in Rockport. The original old schoolhouse, a one-room school, was still standing as late as 1975 and possibly later. The older locals referred to the three-room schoolhouse as the new school long after it was shut down. All other homes and buildings had been bulldozed 30 or 40 years earlier.

Georgia-Pacific Corporation purchased the Rockport site and Rounds' Cloverdale milling operation in 1967. Harry Merlo was vice president and general manager of the firm of Rounds and Kirkpatrick at the time of purchase. In 1971 Merlo became executive vice president of Georgia-Pacific's western lumber and plywood operations. Federal Trade Commission action initiated in 1972 required Georgia-Pacific to transfer California Assets to a newly formed Louisiana-Pacific Corporation with Harry Merlo as its president. Mendocino Redwood Company acquired Rockport from Louisiana-Pacific in 1998.

== California Department of Forestry and Fire Protection (CDF/CalFire) ==
The very first fire station for the California Department of Forestry and Fire Protection was located at Rockport sometime in the mid-1920s. Its existence was to protect the valuable timber land for the Finkbine-Guild Lumber Company, and this service was paid for by the company to the State of California. The station was deemed surplus by the department by the late 1970s, thanks in part to budget cuts spurred by passage of Proposition 13, and abandoned. Fire protection from CalFire is still provided by engines staffed in Fort Bragg and Leggett.

== Rockport Redwood Company Locomotives ==
Number	Builder	Type	Date	Works number	Notes
51	Lima Locomotive Works	Shay geared	February 3, 1906	1646	built as Finkbine Lumber Company # 11
52	Lima Locomotive Works	Shay geared	April 20, 1906	1685	built as Finkbine Lumber Company # 12; sold August 1939, to Clifford C. Bong and Company of Lathrop, California
53	Lima Locomotive Works	Shay geared	May 5, 1916	2847	built as Finkbine Lumber Company # 53; sold to Camino, Placerville and Lake Tahoe Railway of Camino, California for spare parts
54	Lima Locomotive Works	Shay geared	July 24, 1920	3101	built as Finkbine Lumber Company # 54; sold August 1939, for use in the Philippines
