= Mattole Road =

Road in California, United States

- The Wildcat
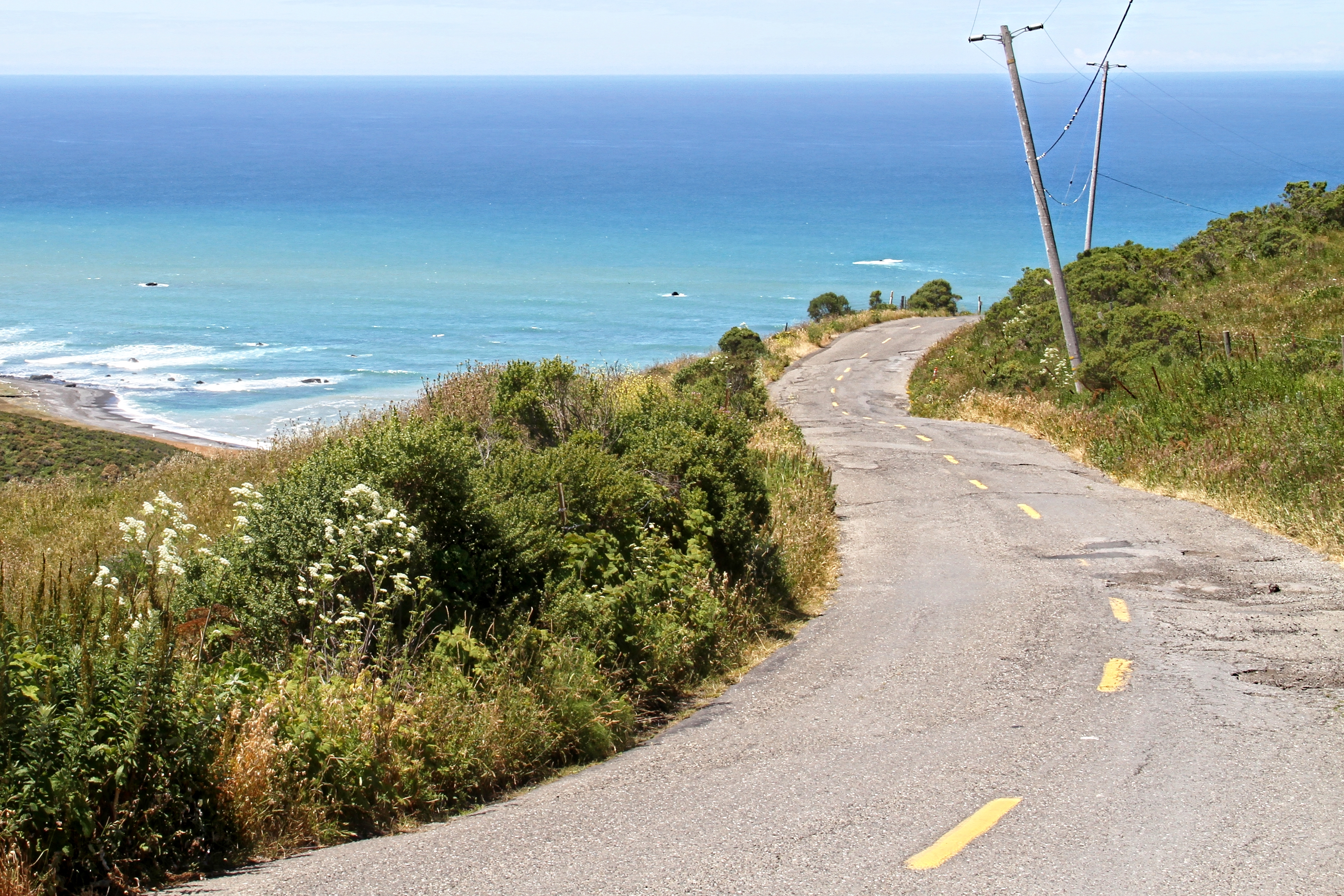
- Mattole Road and the Pacific Ocean
- Length: 61.4 mi (98.8 km)
- Location: Humboldt County, California
- North end: Ferndale, California
- South end: Humboldt Redwoods State Park

Construction
- Established: 1860s as a wagon road

Mattole Road is a 61.4-mile-long (98.8 km) county road in Humboldt County, California. It originates at Ferndale, passes through Capetown and crosses the Bear River, then reaches the Pacific coastline at Cape Mendocino and follows the beach for seven miles (11 km), passes through Petrolia and Honeydew, crosses Panther Gap at 2,744 feet (836 m) elevation, and terminates near U.S. Route 101 (US 101) and Avenue of the Giants inside Humboldt Redwoods State Park. It is the only public access to the Pacific Ocean coastline of the Lost Coast.

It was built as a wagon road in the 1860s.

The road is popular among bicyclists, motorcyclists, and automobile enthusiasts. It has been called "one of America's finest scenic routes", "one of the best adventure drives", and "a must-do road for many motorcyclists". One writer said the view when the final ridge of the coastal hills between Ferndale and the Pacific Ocean is crossed is "[o]ne of the most glorious sights anywhere". The road is included in a National Geographic Society book titled Drives of a Lifetime.
