= Sinkyone Wilderness State Park =

State park in Humboldt and Mendocino Counties, California, United States

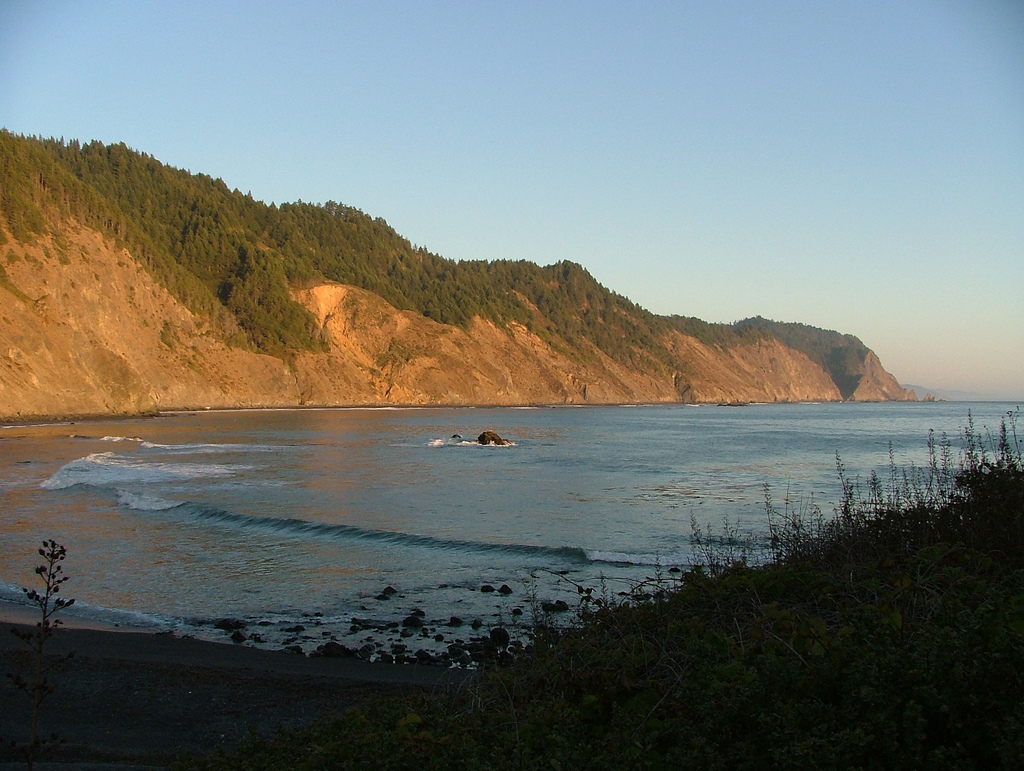
- Bear Harbor

- Location within California Location within the United States
- Location: Mendocino County, California
- Nearest city: Leggett, California
- Coordinates: 39°55′N 123°56′W
- Operator: California Department of Parks and Recreation

Sinkyone Wilderness State Park is a state park in Mendocino County, California. The wilderness area borders the Pacific Ocean to the west and the King Range National Conservation Area to the north. The nearest settlement is the unincorporated town of Leggett. The lack of major road and highway access has led to the Sinkyone Wilderness area being referred to as the Lost Coast.

== History ==
The area takes its name from the native Sinkyone tribe of the area. It was a fertile hunting ground for the Native Americans, providing nearly constant access to fresh fish and meat from the ocean, especially important during the winter months.

Further development through the years saw trails and roads cut through the area for business and industry, both for logging access to the raw timber, and for access to the native tanbark for the San Francisco tanneries. Logging operations continued well into the 20th century.

== See also ==
- List of beaches in California
- List of California state parks
- Parks in Humboldt County, California
