= Fernbridge, California =

Unincorporated community in California, United States

Fernbridge, California Formerly Singley Station (c. 1885 to 1913)
- Unincorporated community
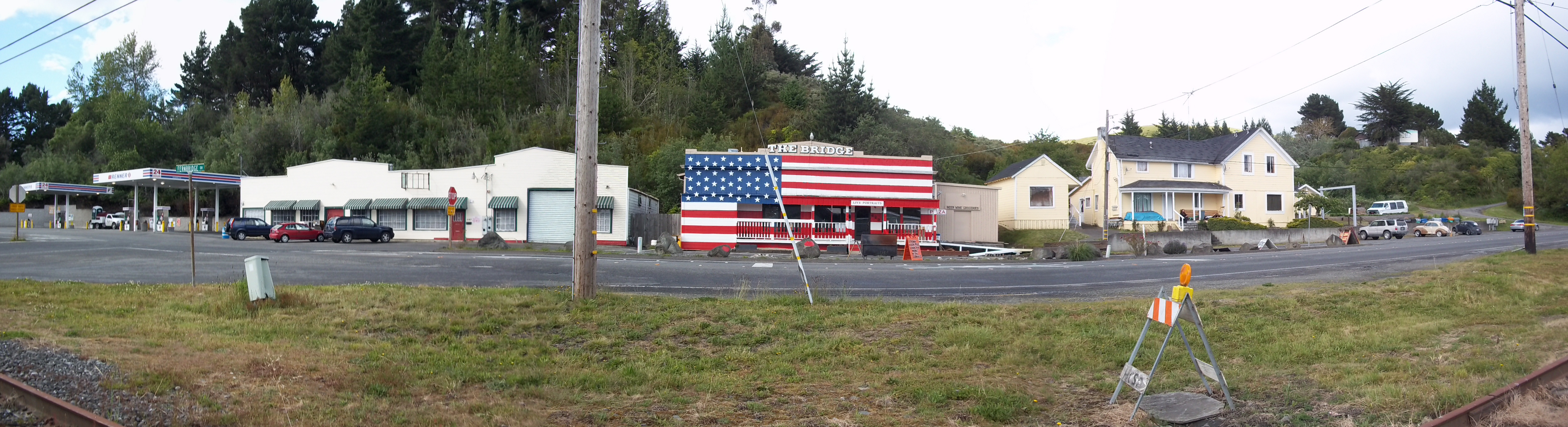
- View of Fernbridge along SR 211 as it was in 2011
- Interactive map of Fernbridge, California
- Country: United States
- State: California
- County: Humboldt
- Established: 1885
- Named for: Fernbridge (the bridge)
- Elevation: 39 ft (12 m)
- Area code: 707

Fernbridge is an unincorporated community at an elevation of 39 feet (12 m) in Humboldt County, California, United States, named for a historic bridge, 3 miles (4.8 km) west-northwest of Fortuna. The Fernbridge bridge is the world's longest poured concrete bridge in operation. It was the only bridge on the lower Eel River to survive the mid-century floods.

== Village of Fernbridge ==
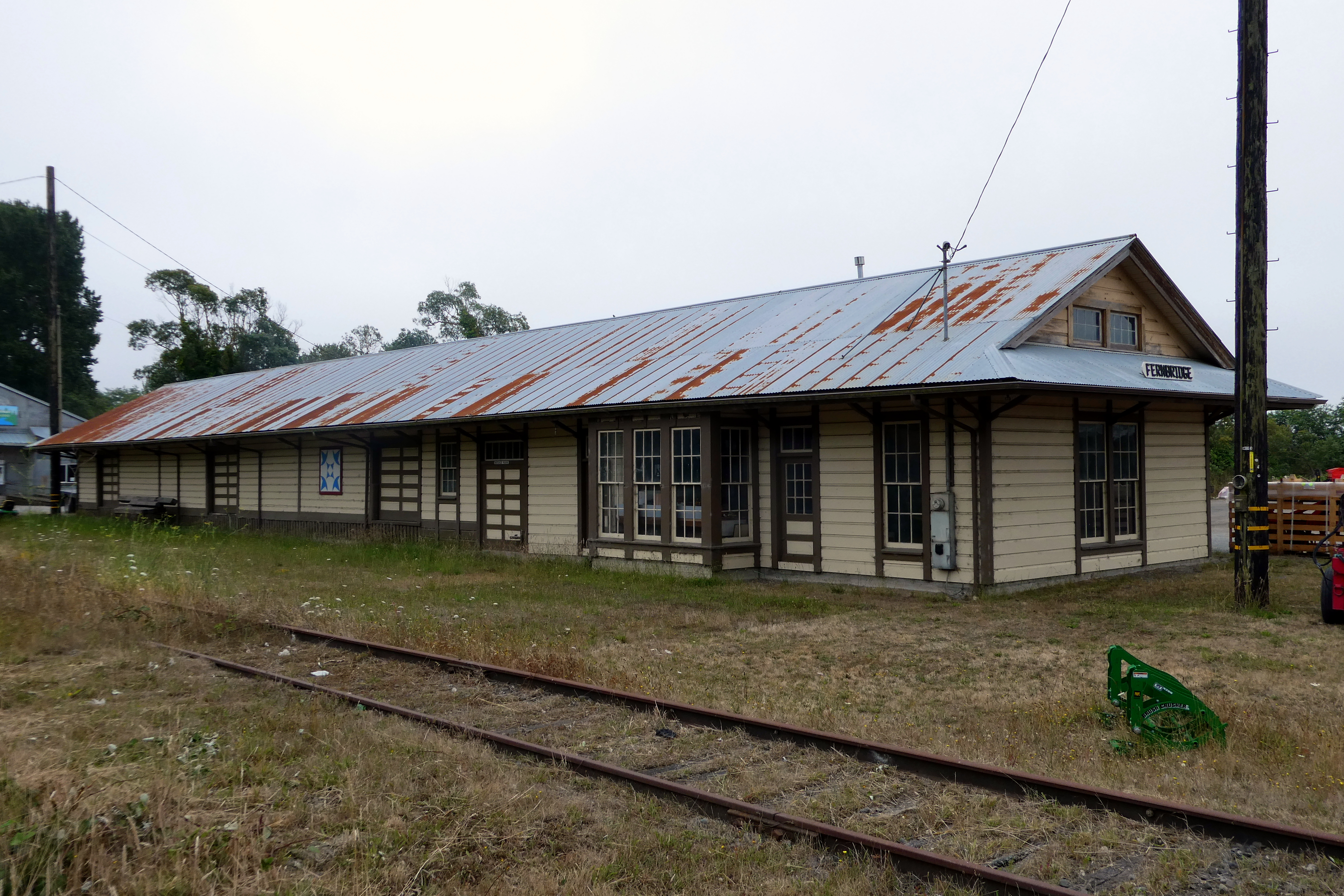
Fernbridge Train Depot in 2022

The unincorporated area named Fernbridge lies between the Eel River and Highway 101 bisected by unused Northwestern Pacific Railroad tracks. The Humboldt Creamery, a roadhouse, the old railway depot, several warehouses, a fuel station and a few houses and other businesses are built along Fernbridge Drive (Old U.S. 101), which now serves as an access road between exits 691 and 692.

Fernbridge is a stop on the Humboldt Transit Authority fixed route transit bus systems, served by the Redwood Transit System connecting north and south Humboldt along 101. Fernbridge ZIP Code is 95540 and the community is inside telephone area code 707.

The United States Geological Survey maintains a webcam overlooking Fernbridge, and a river gauge of water level at the bridge.

=== Early history ===
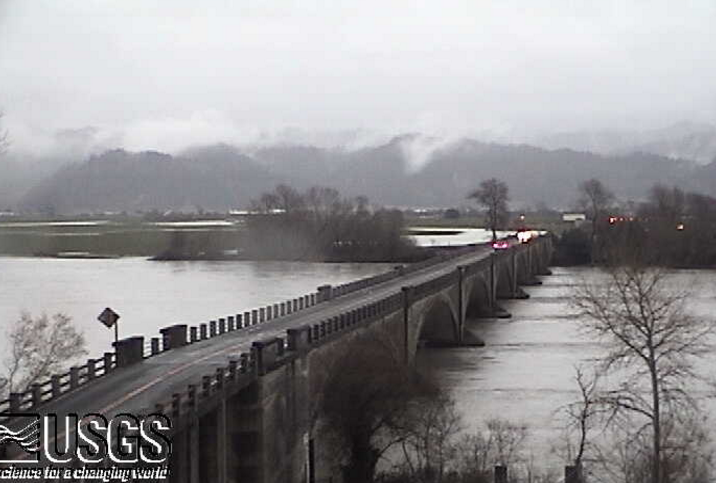
Historic Fernbridge (bridge) during the 2017 Flood. Looking toward Ferndale from the unincorporated area of Fernbridge.

The area was first named Singley Station in 1885 after George Singley who ran a ferry across the Eel River from 1876 to 1889. As soon as a train station was built, a stage ran on a regular schedule to connect to the train. By 1891, the ferry was pulled by a steam winch and a seasonal pontoon bridge was added in the summer.

The town name was changed to Fernbridge from Singley Station about two years after the Fernbridge was built across the Eel in 1910–1911. The first post office at Fernbridge opened in 1924.

In 1934, when California numbered and marked California State Route 1, the route began in Las Cruces and ended at Fernbridge, although by 1984, admitting the route was not feasible south of Ferndale, this section of Route 1 was renumbered to State Highway 211.

== See also ==
- Ferndale Museum (for historical artifacts and extensive history of the Fernbridge bridge)
