= Leggett, California =

Leggett
- Census-designated place
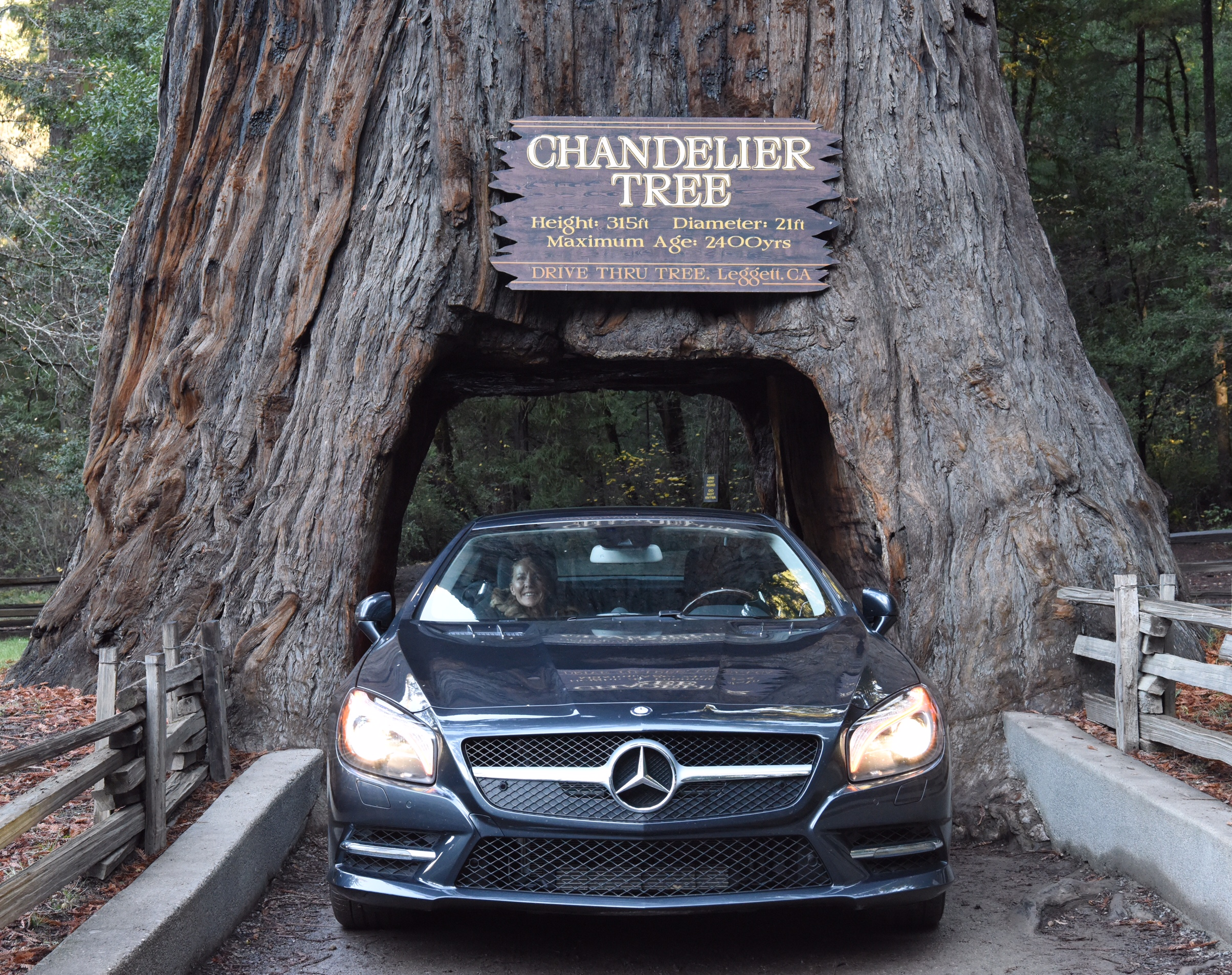
- A Mercedes-Benz SL drives through Leggett's Drive-Through Chandelier Tree.

- Location in Mendocino County, California

- Location within California Location within the United States
- Coordinates: 39°51′57″N 123°42′51″W
- Country: United States
- State: California
- County: Mendocino

Area
  - Total: 2.704 sq mi (7.00 km^{2})
  - Land: 2.704 sq mi (7.00 km^{2})
  - Water: 0 sq mi (0 km^{2}) 0%
- Elevation: 980 ft (300 m)

Population (2020)
  - Total: 77
  - Density: 28/sq mi (11/km^{2})
- Time zone: UTC-8 (PST)
  - Summer (DST): UTC-7 (PDT)
- ZIP Code: 95585
- Area code: 707
- GNIS feature IDs: 227007; 2628750

Leggett (formerly Leggett Valley) is a census-designated place in Mendocino County, California, United States. It is located on the South Fork of the Eel River, 21 miles (34 km) by road northwest of Laytonville, at an elevation of 984 ft (300 m). It is home to some of the largest trees in the world. The nearby Smithe Redwoods State Natural Reserve and Standish-Hickey State Recreation Area are noted for their forests of coastal redwoods. The population of Leggett was 77 at the 2020 census, down from 122 at the 2010 census.

The community is served by California's State Route 1, whose northern terminus with U.S. Route 101 is just outside the center of town.

The town of Leggett includes a single gas station, United States Post Office, 1-12 school, a small grocery store, restaurant, full-service mechanic (ask a local), fire station and the Drive-Thru Tree.

The Leggett post office was dedicated in 1969.

== Geography ==
Leggett is in northwestern Mendocino County, in the valley of the South Fork Eel River. U.S. Route 101 leads north from Leggett 22 miles (35 km) to Garberville and 90 miles (140 km) to Eureka, while to the south it leads 67 miles (108 km) to Ukiah, the Mendocino county seat. California State Route 1 has its northern terminus at US 101 in Leggett and leads southwest 27 miles (43 km) to Westport on the Pacific Ocean.

According to the United States Census Bureau, the Leggett CDP covers an area of 2.7 square miles (7.0 km^{2}), all land.

South Leggett is an unincorporated community along U.S. Route 101, 1 mile (1.6 km) south-southeast of Leggett, at an elevation of 1,112 feet (339 m).

== Climate ==
The region experiences warm (but not hot) and dry summers, with no average monthly temperatures above 71.6 °F (22.0 °C) and cool, very wet winters receiving abundant rainfall, due to its location in the coastal ranges and proximity to the ocean, allowing the collection of heavy amounts of moisture. According to the Köppen Climate Classification system, Leggett has a warm-summer Mediterranean climate, abbreviated "Csb" on climate maps.

Climate data for Legett, California, 39.8658°N 123.7142°W, Elevation: 896 ft (273 m)
Month	Jan	Feb	Mar	Apr	May	Jun	Jul	Aug	Sep	Oct	Nov	Dec	Year
Mean daily maximum °F (°C)	53.0 (11.7)	55.4 (13.0)	59.3 (15.2)	63.3 (17.4)	68.5 (20.3)	75.5 (24.2)	82.8 (28.2)	83.3 (28.5)	82.4 (28.0)	70.9 (21.6)	57.4 (14.1)	51.8 (11.0)	67.0 (19.4)
Daily mean °F (°C)	44.8 (7.1)	46.3 (7.9)	48.8 (9.3)	51.9 (11.1)	56.6 (13.7)	62.7 (17.1)	67.7 (19.8)	67.6 (19.8)	65.9 (18.8)	57.5 (14.2)	48.6 (9.2)	43.8 (6.6)	55.2 (12.9)
Mean daily minimum °F (°C)	36.6 (2.6)	37.1 (2.8)	38.4 (3.6)	40.5 (4.7)	44.6 (7.0)	49.9 (9.9)	52.5 (11.4)	51.9 (11.1)	49.4 (9.7)	45.0 (7.2)	39.8 (4.3)	35.7 (2.1)	43.4 (6.4)
Average precipitation inches (mm)	12.46 (316)	10.93 (278)	9.54 (242)	5.32 (135)	2.73 (69)	0.81 (21)	0.19 (4.8)	0.35 (8.9)	0.78 (20)	4.15 (105)	9.44 (240)	14.43 (367)	71.13 (1,806.7)
Average precipitation days	15.2	12.6	13.4	9.6	5.7	2.6	0.8	0.9	1.8	5.3	13.0	14.6	95.5
Source: National Weather Service

== Demographics ==
Historical population
Census	Pop.	Note	%±
2010	122		—
2020	77		−36.9%
U.S. Decennial Census; 2010

Leggett first appeared as a census designated place in the 2010 U.S. census.

The 2020 United States census reported that Leggett had a population of 77. The population density was 28.5 inhabitants per square mile (11.0/km^{2}). The racial makeup of Leggett was 56 (73%) White, 0 (0%) African American, 0 (0%) Native American, 0 (0%) Asian, 0 (0%) Pacific Islander, 13 (17%) from other races, and 8 (10%) from two or more races. Hispanic or Latino of any race were 17 persons (22%).

The whole population lived in households. There were 35 households, out of which 7 (20%) had children under the age of 18 living in them, 8 (23%) were married-couple households, 9 (26%) were cohabiting couple households, 3 (9%) had a female householder with no partner present, and 15 (43%) had a male householder with no partner present. 5 households (14%) were one person, and 2 (6%) were one person aged 65 or older. The average household size was 2.20. There were 19 families (54% of all households).

The age distribution was 12 people (16%) under the age of 18, 7 people (9%) aged 18 to 24, 26 people (34%) aged 25 to 44, 20 people (26%) aged 45 to 64, and 12 people (16%) who were 65 years of age or older. The median age was 40.5 years. There were 39 males and 38 females.

There were 62 housing units at an average density of 22.9 units per square mile (8.8 units/km^{2}), of which 35 (56%) were occupied. Of these, 17 (49%) were owner-occupied, and 18 (51%) were occupied by renters.

== Transportation ==
The Amtrak Thruway 7 bus provides daily connections to/from Leggett (with a curbside stop at 69501 Highway 101 North), Martinez to the south, and Arcata to the north. Additional Amtrak connections are available from Martinez station.

== Politics ==
In the state legislature, Leggett is in the 2nd senatorial district, represented by Democrat Mike McGuire, and the 2nd Assembly district, represented by Democrat Chris Rogers.

Federally, Leggett is in California's 2nd congressional district, represented by Democrat Jared Huffman.
