= Bear River Band of the Rohnerville Rancheria =

Indian tribe in California, United States

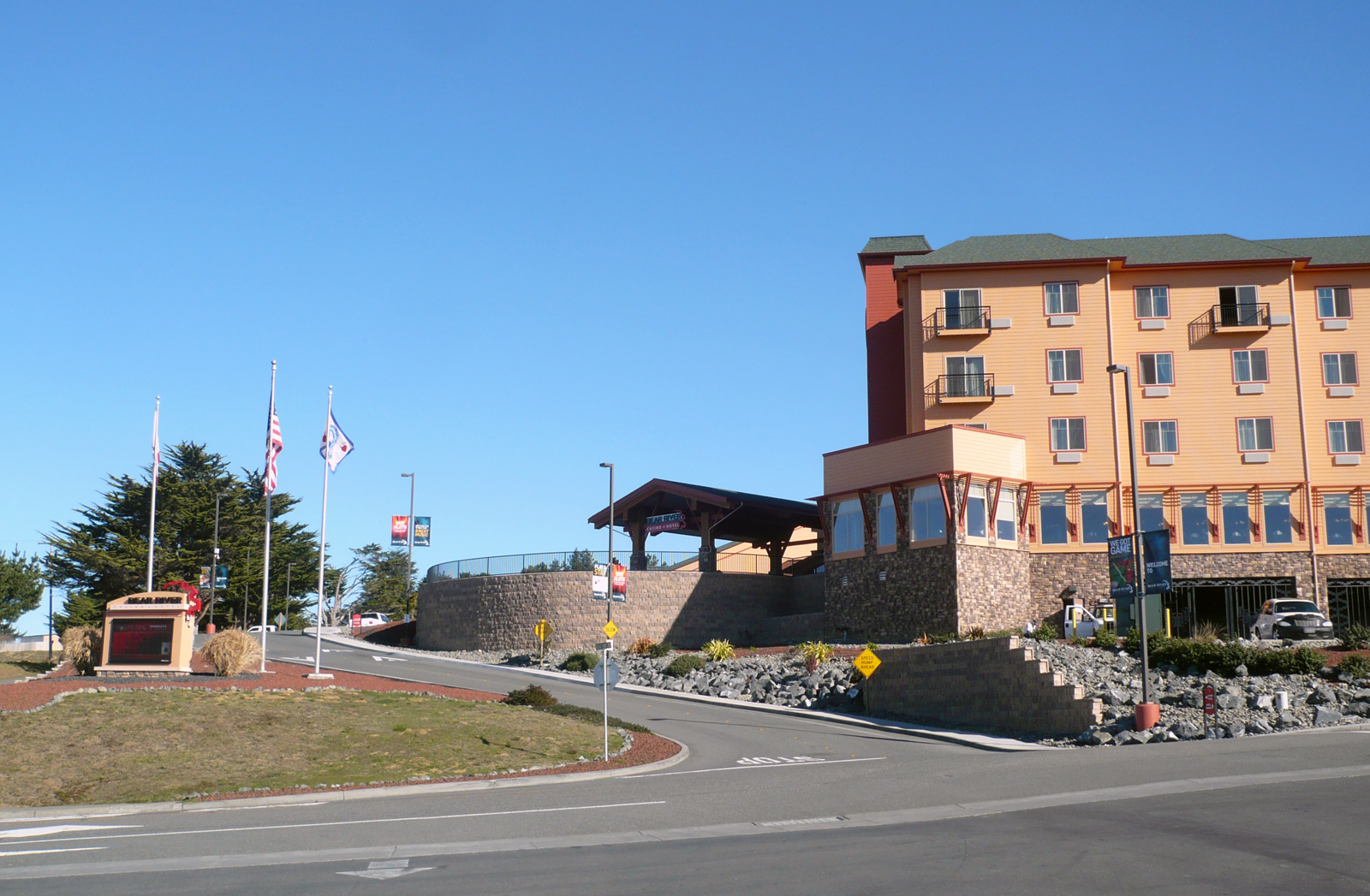
- The tribe's Bear River Casino in Loleta, California

Total population
- 550 enrolled members

Regions with significant populations
- United States (California)

Languages
- English, historically Mattole and Wiyot

Related ethnic groups
- other Mattole and Wiyot people

The Bear River Band of the Rohnerville Rancheria is a federally recognized tribe of Mattole, Bear River and Wiyot people in Humboldt County, California.

== Government ==
The Bear River Band is headquartered near Loleta, California. Tribal enrollment is based on residency on the Rohnerville Rancheria from 1910 to 1960 or being a lineal descent of those residents.

== Reservation and traditional territories ==
Location of Rohnerville Rancheria

The Rohnerville Rancheria is a federally recognized ranchería located in two separate parts. One (40°34′49″N 124°07′21″W) is at the eastern edge of Fortuna, and the other (40°37′53″N 124°12′11″W) to the southeast of Loleta, both in Humboldt County. As of the 2010 Census the population was 38.

The tribe's traditional territory was along the Mattole and Bear Rivers near Cape Mendocino. Wiyot people lived along the Little River down to the Bear River and 25 miles (40 km) eastward. The Mattole villages of Tcalko', Chilsheck, Selsche'ech, Tlanko, Estakana, and Sehtla were located along Bear River.

Map of Rohnerville Rancheria's trust lands and nearby reservations (In light blue.)

== Economic development ==
The Bear River Band owns and operates several entities including Bear River Casino Resort, River's Edge Restaurant, the Thirsty Bear Lounge, Bear River Recreation Center, and Bear River Tobacco Traders all located near Loleta, California. The new Bear River Family Entertainment Center that includes a 10 lane bowling alley, arcade, and laser tag and tournament baseball field open to the public, located next to the Bear River Recreation Center.

== Traditional culture ==
Mattole people differ from neighboring tribes because men traditionally tattooed their faces, instead of just women. Mattole spoke the Mattole language, an Athapaskan language, while Wiyots spoke the Wiyot language, an Algonquian language.
