= Sugar Loaf Island (California) =

Island in California

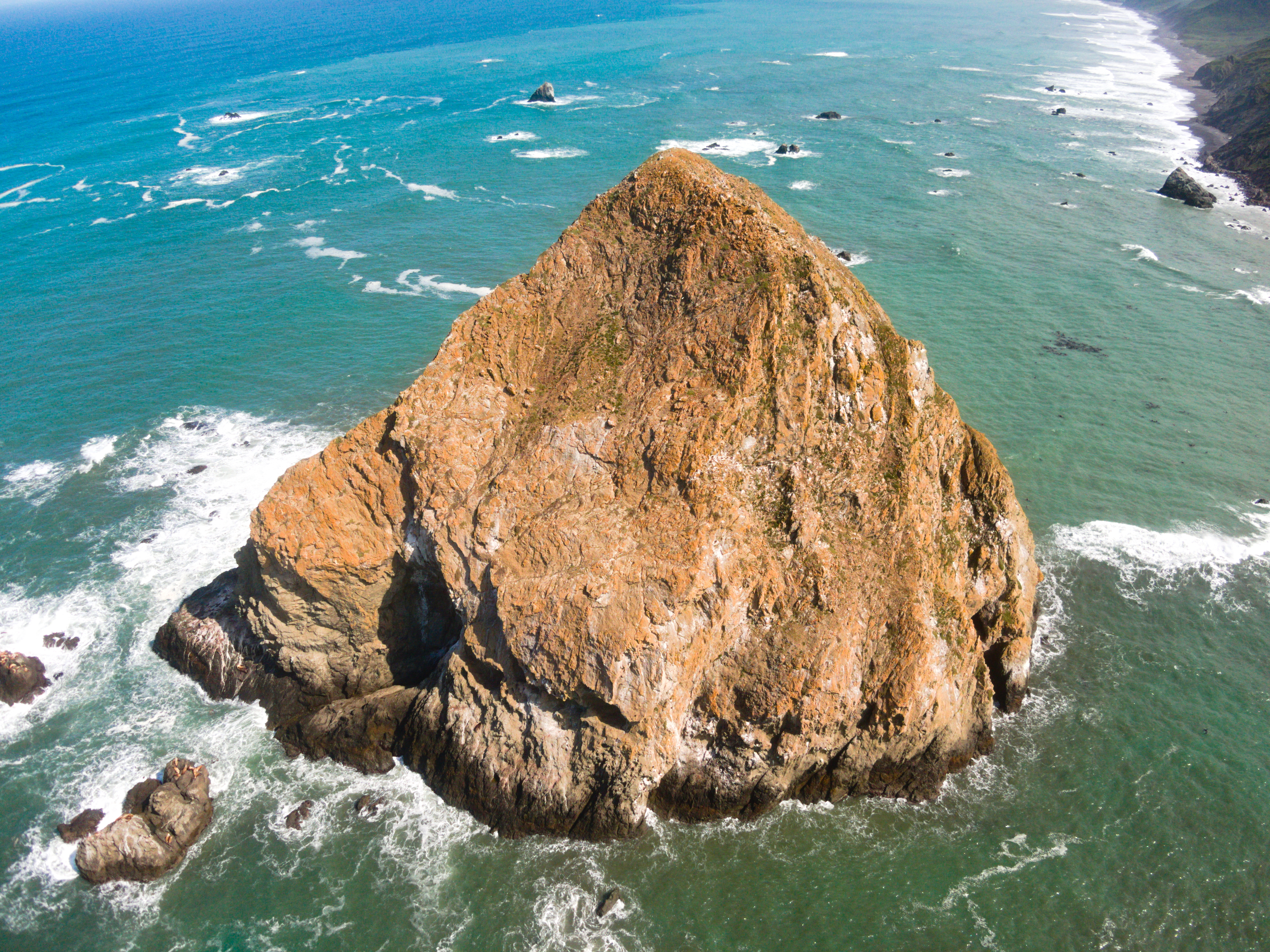
- Sugar Loaf Island

- Location within California Location within the United States

Geography
- Location: Humboldt County, California
- Coordinates: 40°26′20.0″N 124°24′49.7″W
- Adjacent to: Cape Mendocino

Administration
- United States
- State: California
- County: Humboldt
- Governing body: California Department of Fish and Wildlife

Sugar Loaf Island, also known as Sugar Loaf, Cape Rock, Sugarloaf Island, Sugar Loaf Rock, and Sugarloaf Rock Island is an island offshore Cape Mendocino in Humboldt County, California. It is the westernmost island in California.

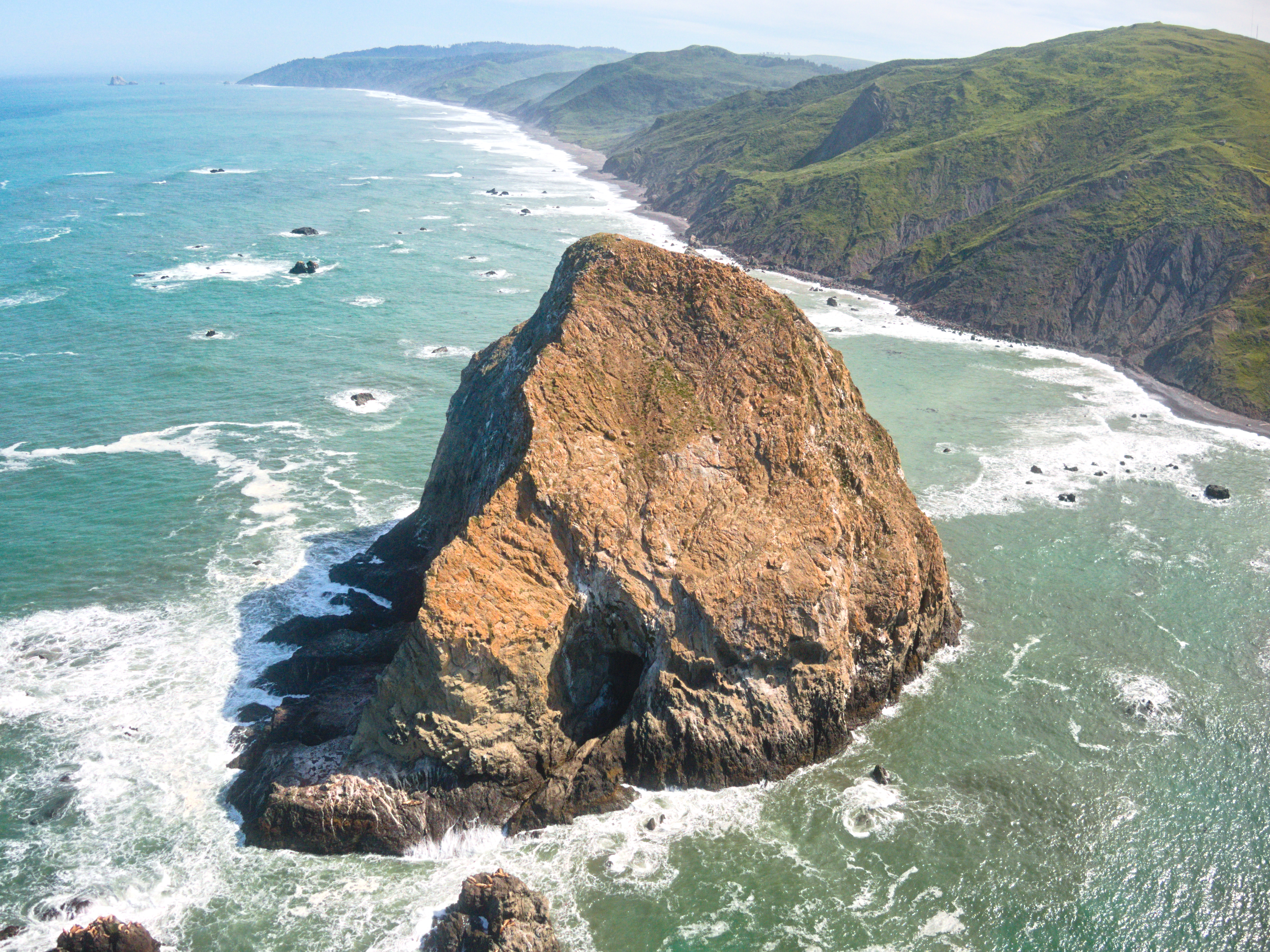
Sugar Loaf Island from the south-west.

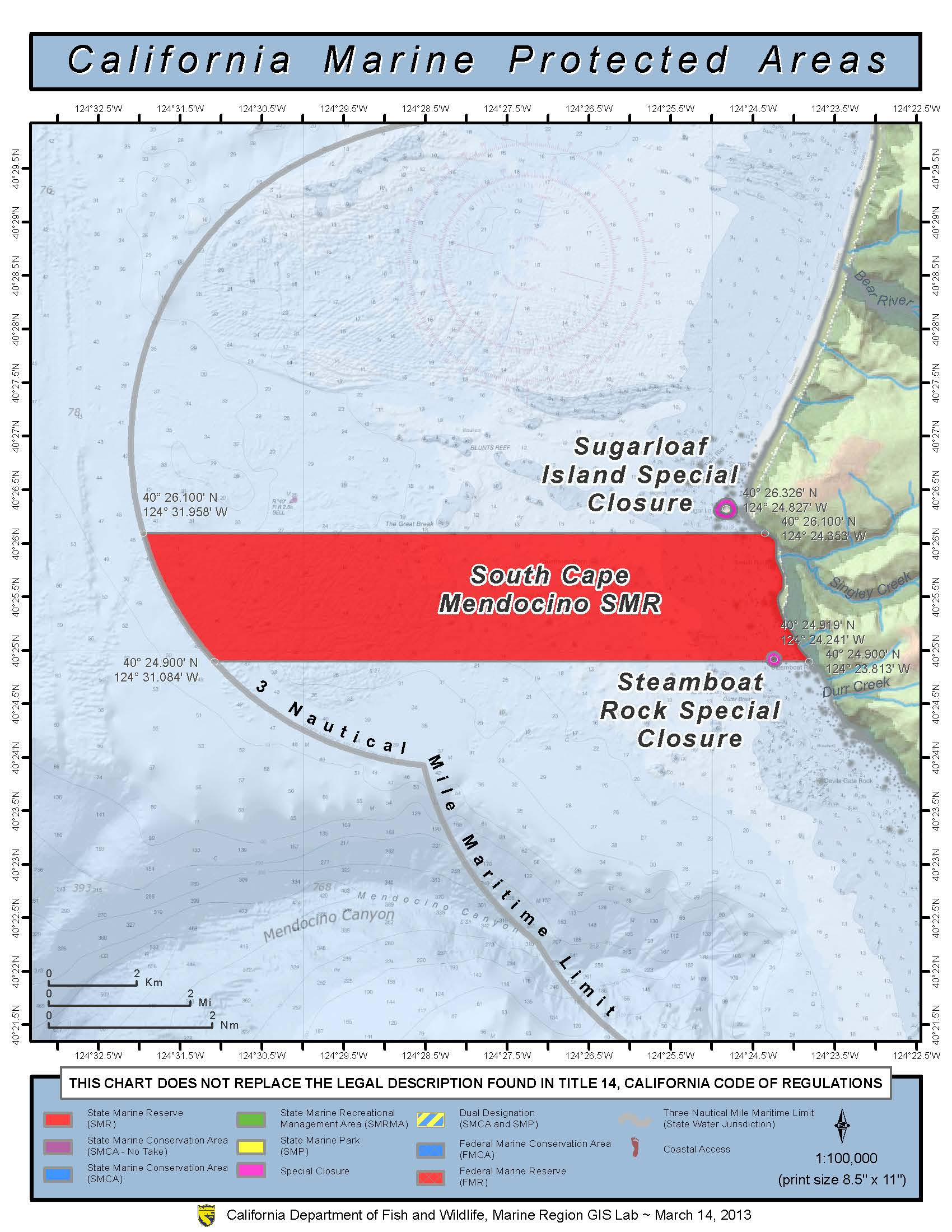
Sugar Loaf Island and special marine zone.

It is part of South Cape Mendocino State Marine Reserve, a large protected marine reserve centered on Cape Mendocino fully protected by the California Department of Fish and Wildlife. The area is one of the most undeveloped sections of the California coast, and its waters are home to important bird and mammal species. Within the South Cape Mendocino State Marine Reserve, the taking of any living marine resources is prohibited. Sugarloaf Island is covered by the Cape Mendocino, California U.S. Topographic Map quadrant.

The island is named because it is shaped like a sugarloaf which was refined sugar in the form of a rounded cone, the most common way of distributing sugar until the late 19th century.

The area provides essential habitat and breeding grounds to the Steller sea lion and its rocky outcroppings also provide resting places for California sea lions. South Cape Mendocino also provides key breeding grounds for the Western gull, double-crested cormorant, Brandt's cormorant, pelagic cormorant, black oystercatcher, pigeon guillemot and tufted puffin.

While it is sometimes confused with "Sugarloaf Rock," the latter is found in the Farallon Islands offshore San Francisco, several hundred miles distant.
