= Mattole River =

River in the United States of America

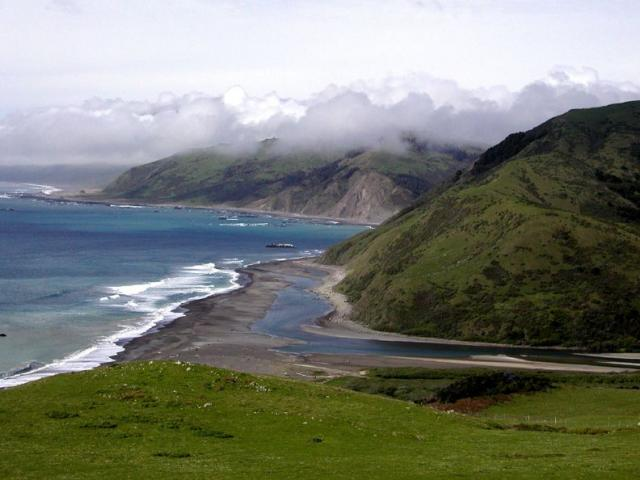
- Mattole River Estuary

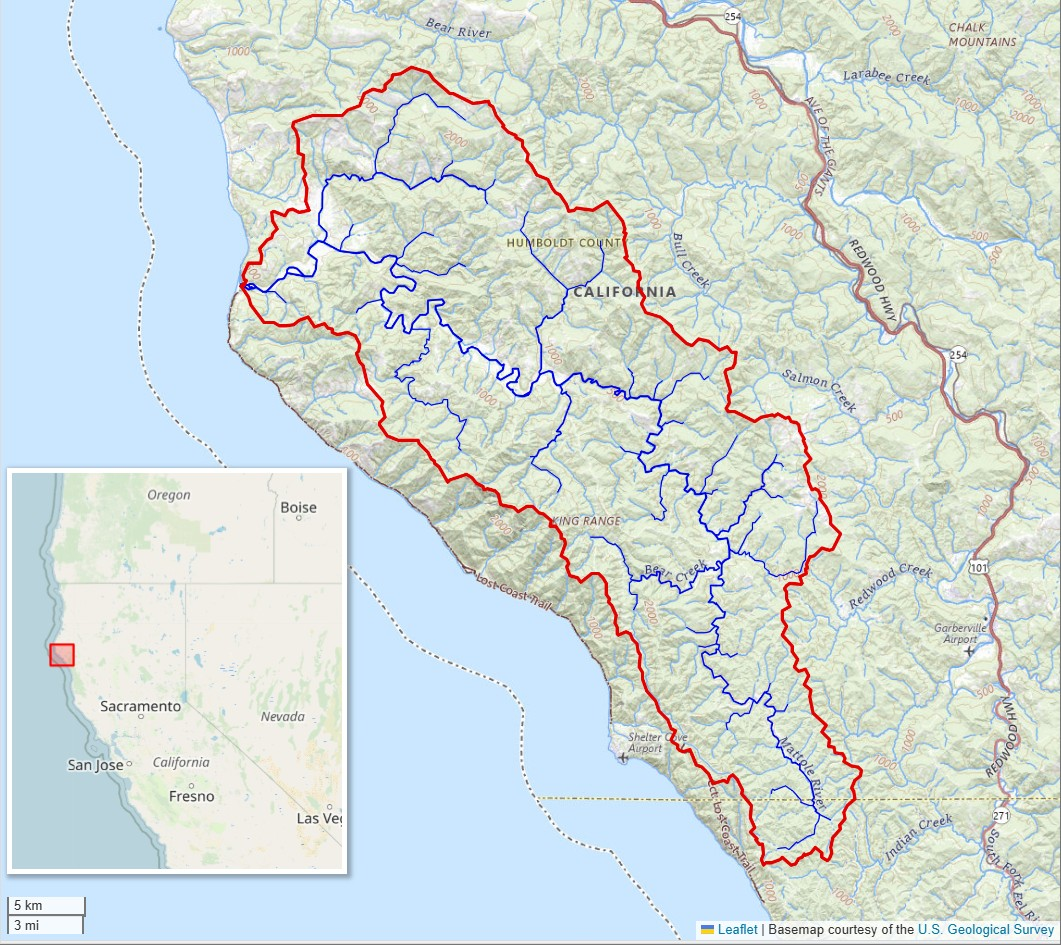
- Mattole River watershed (Interactive map )
- Native name: Mattóal (Mattole)

Location
- Country: United States
- State: California
- Region: Mendocino County, Humboldt County
- Cities: Petrolia, Whitethorn, Honeydew

Physical characteristics
- Source: King Range
  - location: 11 mi (18 km) southwest of Redway, California
  - coordinates: 39°59′7″N 123°58′19″W
  - elevation: 1,780 ft (540 m)
- Mouth: Pacific Ocean
  - location: 4 mi (6 km) west of Petrolia, California
  - coordinates: 40°18′8″N 124°21′14″W
  - elevation: 0 ft (0 m)
- Length: 62 mi (100 km)
- Basin size: 304 sq mi (790 km^{2})
- Discharge
  - location: Petrolia
  - average: 1,288 cu ft/s (36.5 m^{3}/s)
  - minimum: 11 cu ft/s (0.31 m^{3}/s)
  - maximum: 90,400 cu ft/s (2,560 m^{3}/s)

The Mattole River is a river on the north coast of California, that flows northerly, then westerly into the Pacific Ocean. The vast majority of its 62 miles (100 km) course is through southern Humboldt County, though a short section of the river flows through northern Mendocino County. Communities, from north to south, closely associated with the Mattole River include: Petrolia, Honeydew, Ettersburg, Thorn Junction, and Whitethorn. The river enters the ocean at the Mattole Estuary about 4 miles (6.4 km) west-southwest of Petrolia and 10 miles (16 km) south of Cape Mendocino.

== History ==
"Mattole" refers to an Athabaskan Indian people, the Mattole. They historically called themselves Mattóal or bedool, but were referred to by neighboring Wyott Indians as Medol or me'tuul. The local tradition is that Mattole means "clear water".

The Mattole lived principally on the Mattole and Bear rivers. During the Bald Hills War, this tribe mustered its warriors but it was outgunned and practically exterminated because of its resistance to white settlers.

== Watershed ==
The river and its 74 tributaries drain about 304 square miles (790 km^{2}), including the eastern side of the King Range, and flow through Mattole Valley before emptying into the Pacific Ocean. Although the Mattole River's source is at about 1,780 feet (540 m) elevation, its tributaries originate as high as 4,000 feet (1,200 m) above sea level. The North Fork of the Mattole River enters the river main stem just west of Petrolia. For most of its length, the river is only a 4.2 miles (6.8 km) east of the King Range National Conservation Area. About halfway to the ocean, near Honeydew, California, the river passes by Humboldt Redwoods State Park. There are numerous tributaries and creeks that feed the drainage area. Some of the largest are the Upper North Fork at Honeydew (as opposed to the North Fork at Petrolia), Honeydew, Bear, Rattlesnake, and Oil Creeks.

== Ecology and conservation ==
The Mattole River has been declared by the California Coastal Commission as a 303(d) impaired waterbody that flows into a Marine Protected Area (Punta Gorda State Marine Reserve). Areas in the Mattole River watershed are being restored to revive habitat that was degraded by a combination of early industrial-style timber harvest techniques and associated road construction, naturally erosive geology, and damage by two 100-year floods, which occurred in 1955 and 1964. The Mattole River and Range Partnership, consisting of the Mattole Restoration Council, Mattole Salmon Group, and Sanctuary Forest, undertakes this work with the collaboration of watershed landowners and funding from multiple private and sources.

The river is used for recreation and agricultural, municipal and industrial water supply. It also provides wildlife habitat, including cold freshwater habitat for fish migration and spawning. The Mattole River is home to three salmonid species listed as threatened under the Federal Endangered Species Act: chinook and coho salmon, and steelhead. Coho salmon are additionally listed as threatened under the California State Endangered Species Act. The Mattole Salmon Group counted just three adult Coho salmon in the river in the 2009-2010 winter (and only one redd), which is the lowest number of coho counted since the group began surveys in 2004. This is far below the 19th-century historical estimates of 17,000 to 20,000 adults annually, or the 1950s and 1960s estimates of 8,000 and 5,000 annually, respectively. In 2010–2011 ten coho were counted and five redds, but these numbers are 95% lower than 2006–2007. Each salmon run is on a three-year cycle.

The Mattole Restoration Council, the Mattole Salmon Group, Sanctuary Forest, the Mill Creek Watershed Conservancy, the Upper Mattole River and Forest Cooperative and the Mattole River and Range Partnership fosters the Mattole River habitat restoration work and serves as a model for other communities wanting to work cooperatively to repair anadromous salmonid habitat. Recently the group planned a pilot project to decrease winter runoff and increase summer flows, by using a model of beaver dams and pools. Research done by an ecosystem analyst from the Northwest Fisheries Science Center of NOAA Fisheries shows that salmon smolt production per beaver dam ranges from 527 to 1,174 fish, whereas production in a pool formed by large woody debris is only 6 to 15 fish. This suggests that re-establishment of beaver populations would be 80 times more effective in salmonid recovery efforts than placement along of large woody debris.

In the early 1990s residents of the lower Mattole River (Humboldt County, CA) watershed created the Mattole Watershed Alliance to work on improving Mattole River conditions toward the common goal of preserving populations of wild salmonids.

The common plant associations within the Mattole include the following: (1) coast redwood forest (in the southern headwaters), (2) mixed coast Douglas-fir and hardwood primarily tanoak and Pacific madrone forest, (3) mixed chaparral, primarily manzanita, mountain whitethorn, California scrub oak, and coyote brush, and (4) grasslands. Riparian zones of the Mattole also support bigleaf maple, red alder, Fremont cottonwood, Oregon ash, and willow.

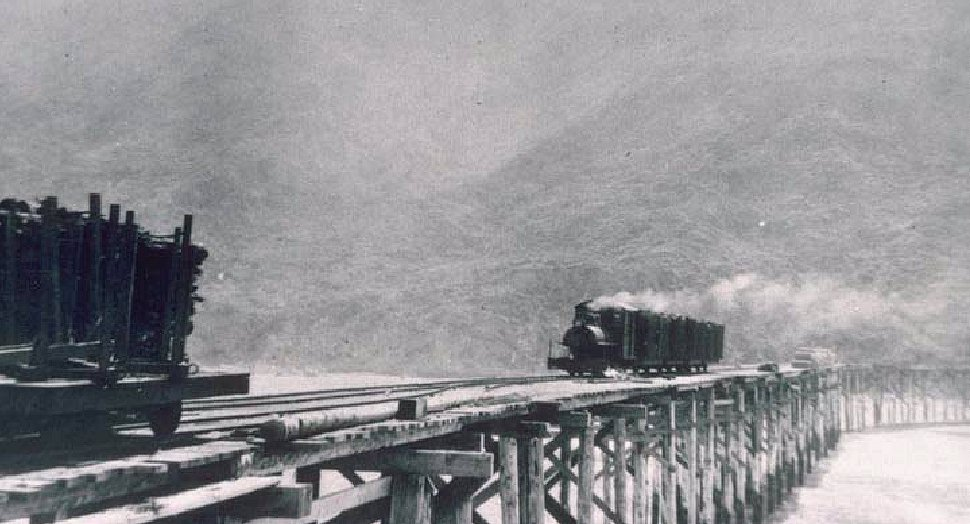
Logging train crossing the Mattole River mouth, circa 1900

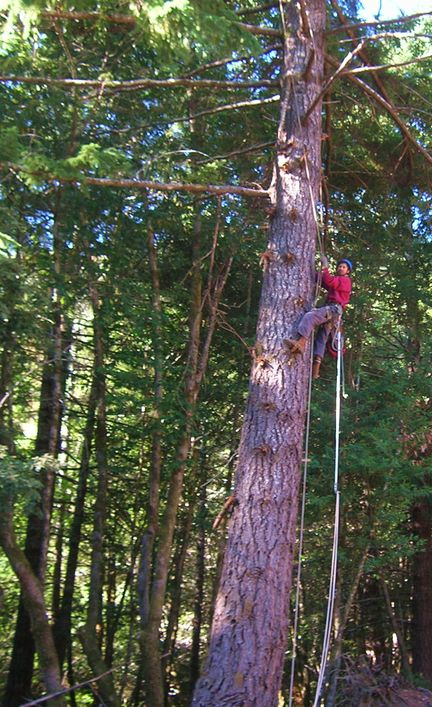
Climbing high to collect native seeds for restoration in the Mattole Watershed

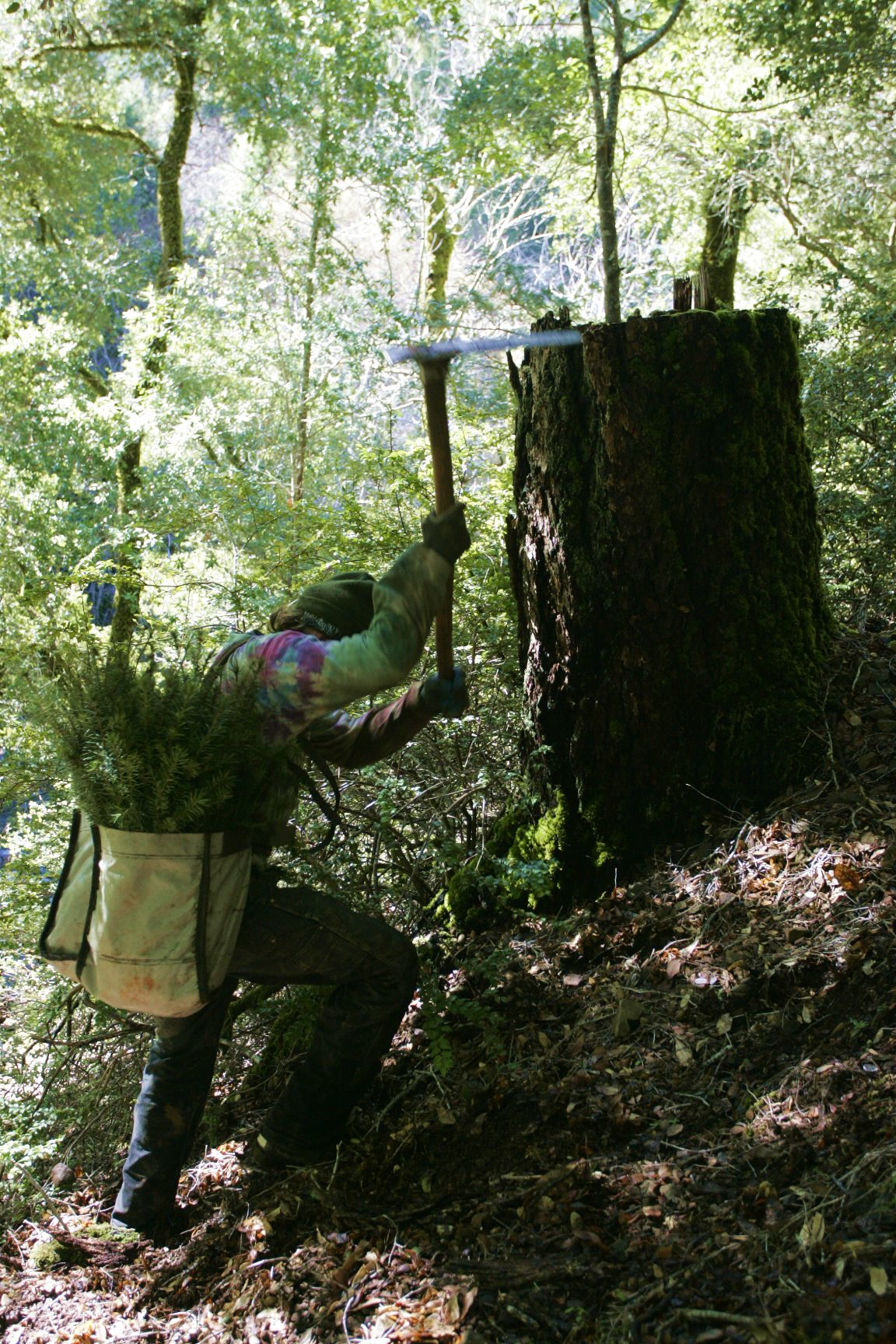
Volunteer replants native Douglas Fir on the river

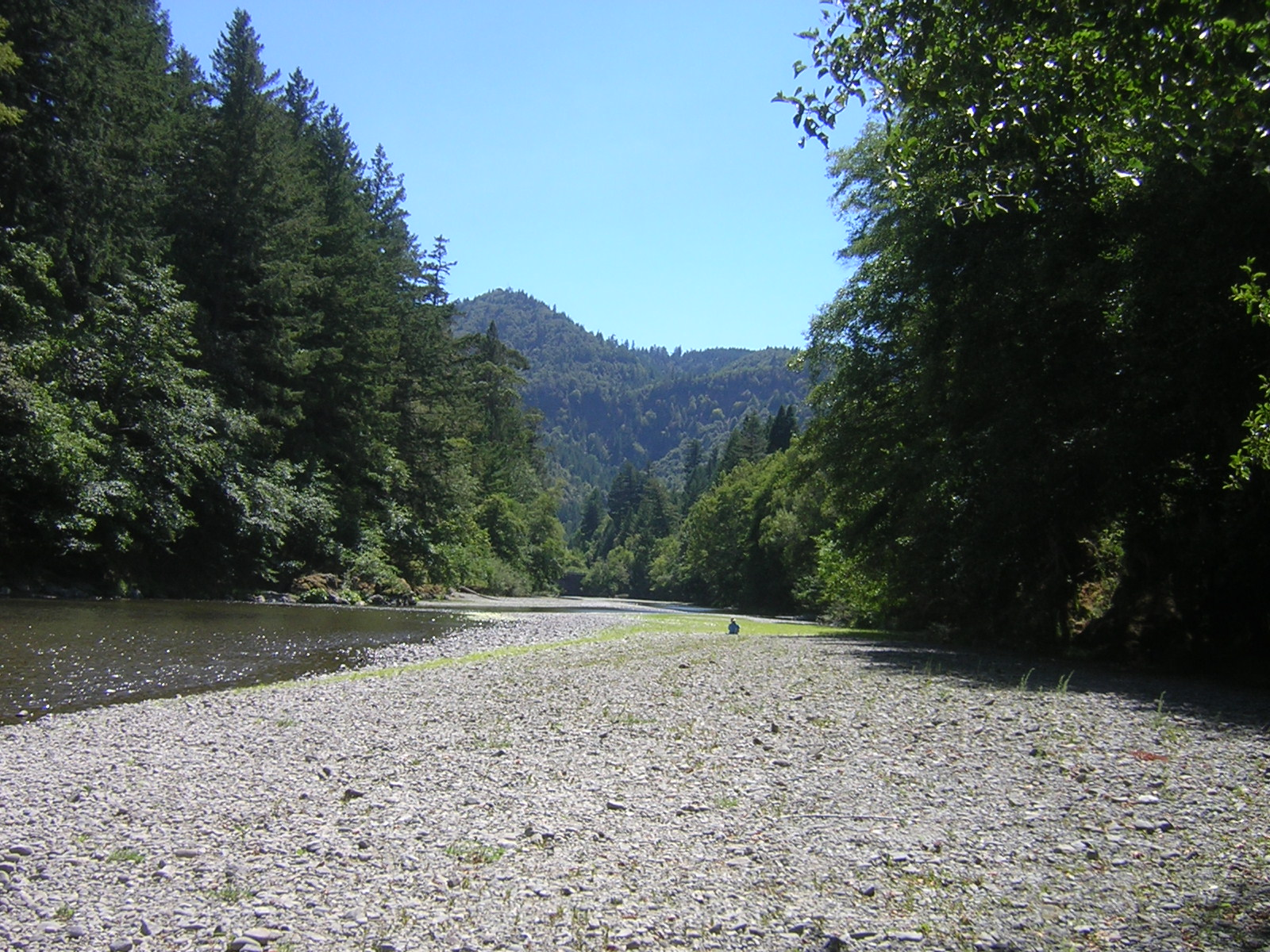
Mattole River at Arthur W. Way County Memorial Park

== Parks and Recreation ==
Arthur W. Way County Memorial Park is on the north bank of and adjacent to the river.

Humboldt Redwoods State Park is along the eastern slopes of the Middle Mattole

Kings Range Nation Conservation Area flanks the watershed to the west.

== Geography ==
In the 1850s, Euro-American settlers started ranching and agricultural traditions on the land. This would inhibit contraction of disease and decrease the native Mattole tradition of relying on river resources. Post World War II: Logging of Douglas fir became an increased practice for this period of building construction and the tax value of standing trees rose as well. Since logging increased, more debris settled in the Mattole River, further damaging it.

From 1947 to 1988, the old-growth coniferous forest in the watershed was decreased by 90 percent. Because of the increased industrialism of this time period, road building led to a network of roads. The basin streams became destabilized. Forest practices, like the skidding of logs downstream channels became normal practice. The streams and forestry along the Mattole were damaged as a result.

Logging occurred from the late 1800s to the mid 20th century, starting from tanbark harvesting to Douglas fir that grew in its place. Harvesting that caused considerable siltation of the river bed. In 1933, 1955 and 1964 historically large floods greatly changed the structure of the Mattole streams. After the floods of 1964, sediment yields averaged 16,370 tons per square mile of watershed area, approximately .25 inches per year averaged across the watershed's area. At this time the erosion rates in the Mattole River were approximately 0.001 inches per year. As a result, the transportation of sediment to slow and eventually fill great spawning habitat stream channels.

== Restoration ==
A 1959 survey from the U.S. Fish and Wildlife Service reported Mattole spawning runs were 10,000 Chinook salmon and 4,000 coho salmon. Later in 1964, a survey from the California Department of Fish and Game reported Mattole spawning runs were 10,000 Chinook salmon and 4,000 coho salmon. During the 1980s, reports showed the Chinook salmon run fell to 3,000. This number dropped even lower in 1990 and 1991, when Chinook salmon run fell to 100 and coho salmon fell to approximately 100 as well. The American Fisheries Society classified the species as "high risk for extinction".

1980: The Mattole Salmon Group (MSG) was formed by local residents. Their aim is to restore the native salmon populations. The MSG created gravel-lined "hatchboxes" to substitute for the lost spawning habitat areas. Adult spawners were held until they had their eggs and these were incubated in the hatchboxes. This process jumped the survival rate of "egg-to-fry" from 15 percent to 80 percent.

In 1981, local residents and activists began the Mattole salmon project by Freeman House. They began incubating salmon eggs, clearing logjams and obstacles for fish migration and plant trees to sustain the riverbanks. They will choose to take care of the salmon before they work on their homesteads.

Freeman House released the first Mattole Restoration Newsletter was issued in 1983. Its concepts encouraged residents to fight for fine timber, abundant fish, productive grasslands, and rich and varied plant and animal communities.

In 1983, the Mattole Restoration Council (MRC) was formed. Their purpose being to combine the restoration efforts with landowners and residents. They issued "Elements of Recovery," a catalog of prescriptions and erosional sources in 1987. It mapped and categorized areas of tributary drainage and erosional features on the watershed. This project revealed the number of roads, including both active and abandoned roads in the Mattole basin. Techniques and expertise for this project were developed at Redwood National Park. In 1991, MRC's Douglas fir reforestation project showed a survival rate of 70 to 80 percent. This increased shade, aiding in the hatching of eggs which require a cool temperature.

Rock wing and small wing deflectors were installed and protected about 400 yards of the riverbank from 1977 to 1984. Of the structures, six created wide scour pools from 3 to 6 feet deep, with shade from overhead riparian vegetation.

== Headwater Channel Species ==
From the early 1960s to 1999, the Southern torrent salamander was encountered in undisturbed slow-flowing water.

In 1997, timber harvesting limited the ancient pacific tailed frogs in the headwater channels causing the species became endangered.

In 2005, the pacific tailed frogs could be found in small population sizes along old-growth forests. Their small populations are scattered along the river, because of heightened water temperatures. These temperature highs are above the level for egg development during the summer when these frogs oviposit under stream substrates. The pacific tailed frogs are also endangered, because they have morphological adaptations and biophysical constraints with temperatures so they are ecologically dependent.

== Herptiles of Mattole River ==
In 2005, Foothill yellow-legged frog were commonly encountered in all channels of the river. Their tadpoles are found increasingly at temperatures above 13 degrees Celsius. The adults are often found in open sun, basking on "gravel bars, boulders and cobbles," because they are "heliotherms" (their body temperature warms by sun's rays). Their eggs are deposited in shallow water in open sunlight near their cobbles and boulders. Rough-skinned newts can be found in headwater channels or terrestrial habitats.

In 2010, Western fence lizards are found along alluvial channels of the river. This number increases as the water temperature and the level of sediment increases. They stay near the warmer climates because their invertebrate prey is more accessible here.

== See also ==
- List of rivers in California
- Lost Coast
