= Yiannis Evangelides =

Greek fashion designer

Yiannis Evangelides (Greek: Γιάννης Ευαγγελίδης) was a Greek fashion designer.

Evangelides was born in Cyprus and moved to Athens when he was 18. He married Vasso Kourtidi. Evangelides originally intended to become a pianist, but after designing dresses for his wife which she had made up by her dressmaker, he decided to go into fashion design. Before World War II broke out in 1939, Evangelides was a couturier in Athens for 20 years. Among his clients was the future Queen of Greece, Frederica of Hanover, who Evangelides described in 1958 as his easiest, least demanding client. Frederica patronised Evangelides between 1938 and 1945.

His first New York show was held in January 1940, showing pleated gowns in blue and terracotta, with short decorative jackets and draped scarves directly referencing Greek folk costume. In 1951 Evangelides had returned to New York, where he planned to stay and establish himself as a designer, not just of couture, but of ready-to-wear for the wholesale market. Alongside his twenty years' experience in high-end fashion design, he had also worked for five years as a designer for a wholesaler in Capetown, California. In 1954 Evangelides became a designer for the custom salon at Bonwit Teller, where his dresses, presented alongside imported Paris gowns, were noted for their use of tucks and pleats. In 1958, Evangelides owned a dress shop on East 57th Street, titled "Yanni". He offered his first ready-to-wear collection in 1958.
