= Petrolia, California =

Unincorporated community in California, United States

Petrolia
- Unincorporated community
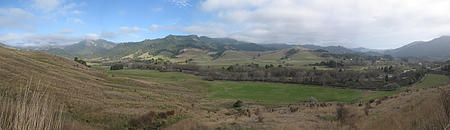
- Panorama view of Petrolia

- Location in California Petrolia (the United States)
- Coordinates: 40°19′31″N 124°17′13″W
- Country: United States
- State: California
- County: Humboldt
- Elevation: 121 ft (37 m)
- Postal code: 95558
- Area code: 707

California Historical Landmark
- Official name: California's First Drilled Oil Wells
- Reference no.: 543

Petrolia is an unincorporated community in Humboldt County, California, United States, United States, 10 miles (16 km), southeast of Cape Mendocino. The site of the first oil well drilled in California, it lies at an elevation of 121 feet (37 m) above sea level, within ZIP Code 95558, with an area code 707.

== Description ==
Petrolia has an estimated population of 300–500 people within a 15-mile radius. It is located in the Mattole Valley, part of the Lost Coast region, one of the largest wilderness areas and the longest stretch of undeveloped coastline in the continental United States. Petrolia's isolation is due to its position on the rocky, treacherous coastline adjacent to the King Range mountains that isolate this area from mainland California and continue to leave the area almost completely undeveloped.

A travel magazine has called this area "too lovely to be believed, perhaps too beautiful to last". It has been recognized as the top "still wild" place in California. The area is the only significant stretch of California without a shoreline highway, limiting through-travelers, tourists, and development."

The 35 miles (56 km) of steep roadways beneath the King Range mountains include towering Douglas firs, a few coast redwoods around the upper reaches of the Mattole River, rocky shorelines, and black sand beaches, as well as a variety of California wildlife, including black bears, black-tailed deer, river otter, steelhead trout, California quail, bobcat and porcupine, reptiles such as rattlesnakes, western fence lizards and alligator lizards, various amphibians and bald eagles.

Petrolia has been described as "a river valley town with Norman Rockwell flavor." Petrolia is 5 miles (8.0 km) from the Pacific Ocean at the north end of the 25-mile (40 km) section of beach protected by the King Range National Conservation Area and Sinkyone Wilderness State Park; the Punta Gorda Light location is about 3 miles down the coast from Mattole Beach parking. The Mattole River is home to over 250 bird species and the threatened Mattole salmon, the subject of a book about the community's two-decade attempt to preserve it. It is one of the few remaining areas with virgin old-growth stands of Douglas fir.

== Geography and climate ==
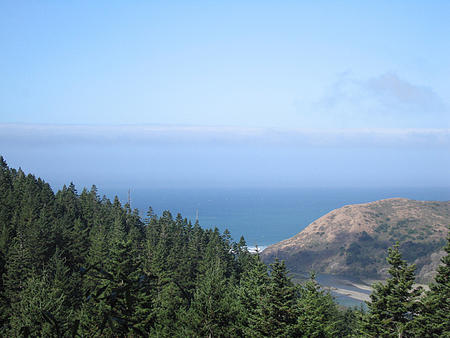
Overlooking the Pacific coastline in Petrolia

Petrolia is located near the Mendocino triple junction, where three geologic fault lines meet, and experiences frequent earthquake activity. A magnitude 7.1 earthquake in 1992 resulted in a fire that destroyed the 100-year-old Petrolia General Store. Two of the remaining landmarks in Petrolia are a small wooden church dating from 1912—St. Patrick's Catholic Church—and the Petrolia Pioneer Cemetery, which has the graves of original residents of Petrolia dating from November 1857.

On the evening of March 9, 2014, a magnitude 6.9 earthquake struck approximately 50 miles to the west. It was widely felt, yet caused little to no damage, nor did it generate a tsunami. The lack of any significant damage or land deformation was attributed to the shallow strike-slip fault movement in deep (3000m) water. In 2010 two other large quakes had hit the area, a 6.5 on January 9 and a 5.9 on February 3; neither caused any deaths, but the January quake was reported to have caused damage throughout the area.

The weather in Petrolia is temperate. The town is located in a area that is sheltered from the fog that reaches Eureka and some of the northern towns, such as Arcata and McKinleyville. As a result, the summers are dry and sunny, typically around 70 °F (21 °C) with temperatures occasionally reaching as high as 90 °F (32 °C). Winters are rainy from November through April, with temperatures typically around 50 °F (10 °C) and occasionally falling to the high 30s or low 40s (°F) at night. Honeydew, California, which is located only 14 miles (23 km) south of Petrolia, has a less temperate climate and its summers and winters are more extreme, with one of the highest amounts of winter rainfall in the contiguous 48 states.

There are only two roads that lead into Petrolia, one from the north from Ferndale, California, and one from the south from Honeydew, leading through scenic redwood forests that were the site for the filming of Jurassic Park and After Earth. Both roads are winding, steep, and sometimes unpaved, passing large tracts of scenic overlooks and wilderness areas. They are popular routes for visitors, especially mountain bikers and motorcyclists, and have been described as leading to "an almost comically steep drop to the sea". The road from Petrolia to Ferndale follows the ocean and has unbroken vistas of rocky ocean coastline and beach. Petrolia is surrounded by large tracts of original homestead ranches and farms.

The Mattole area, particularly the Lost Coast beaches, which feature tide pools, pristine beaches and relatively deserted hiking trails, is popular with visitors. At certain times of year, migrating gray whales can be seen from shore, as well as colonies of harbor seals and sea lions. Local residents use the Mattole River for swimming, rafting, canoeing, kayaking and catch and release fly fishing. The South Cape Mendocino State Marine Reserve and Sugarloaf Rock are immediately offshore and are closed to public access.

== History ==
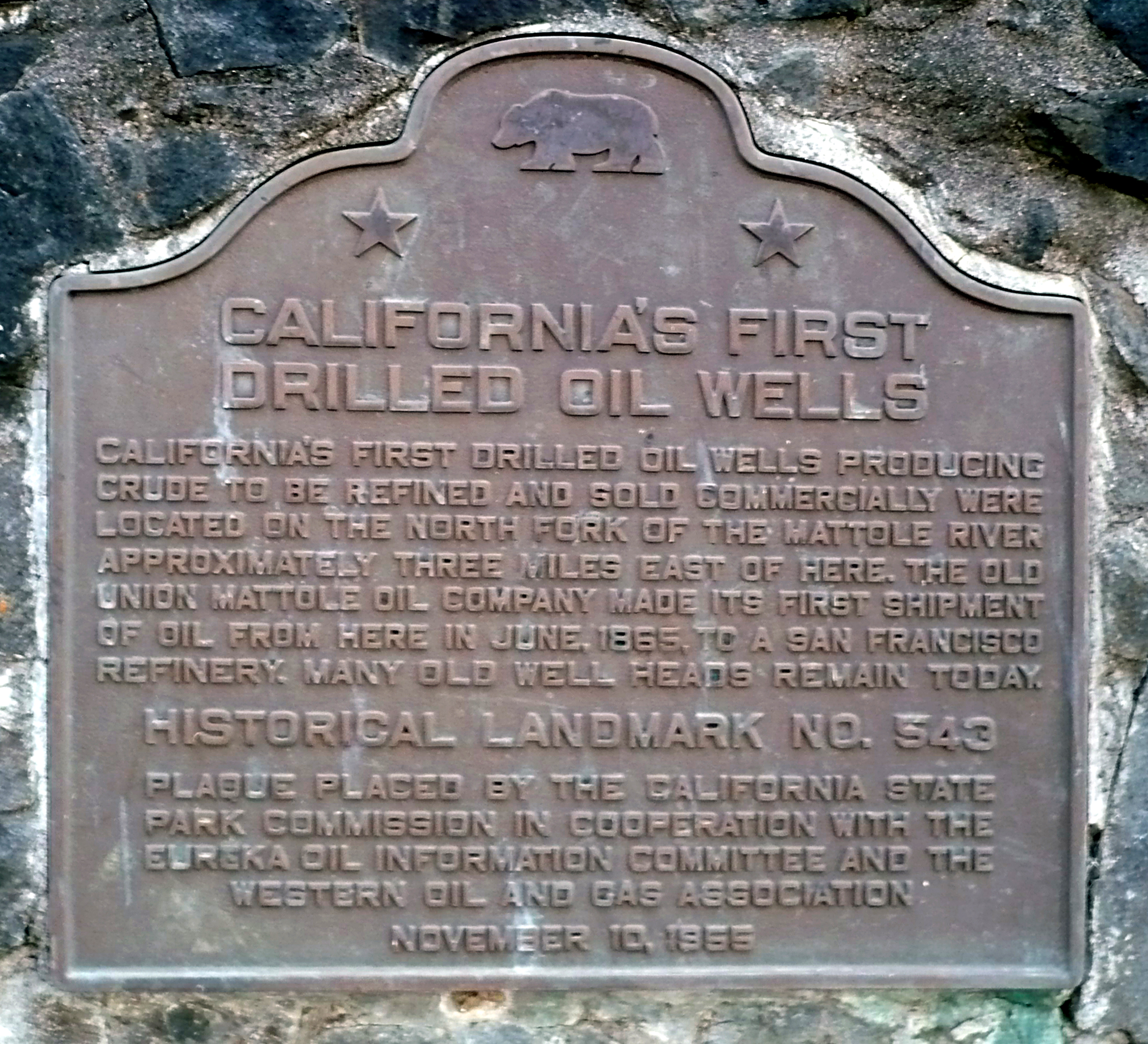
California Historical Landmark #543, California's first drilled oil wells

At the time of first contact with White settlers the area was inhabited by the Mattole, a Pacific Coast Athapaskan people, who had arrived from today's Canada several hundred years earlier. Carbon dating estimates suggest the area had been inhabited by other tribes for over 6000 years.

There was significant conflict between the Mattole and the settlers, mainly composed of oil prospectors and ranching homesteaders. The last remaining descendants of the Mattole live today in Bear River on the Rohnerville Rancheria, but there are no remaining native speakers of the Mattole language. There are estimated to be more than 80 archeological sites of significance in the Lost Coast area.

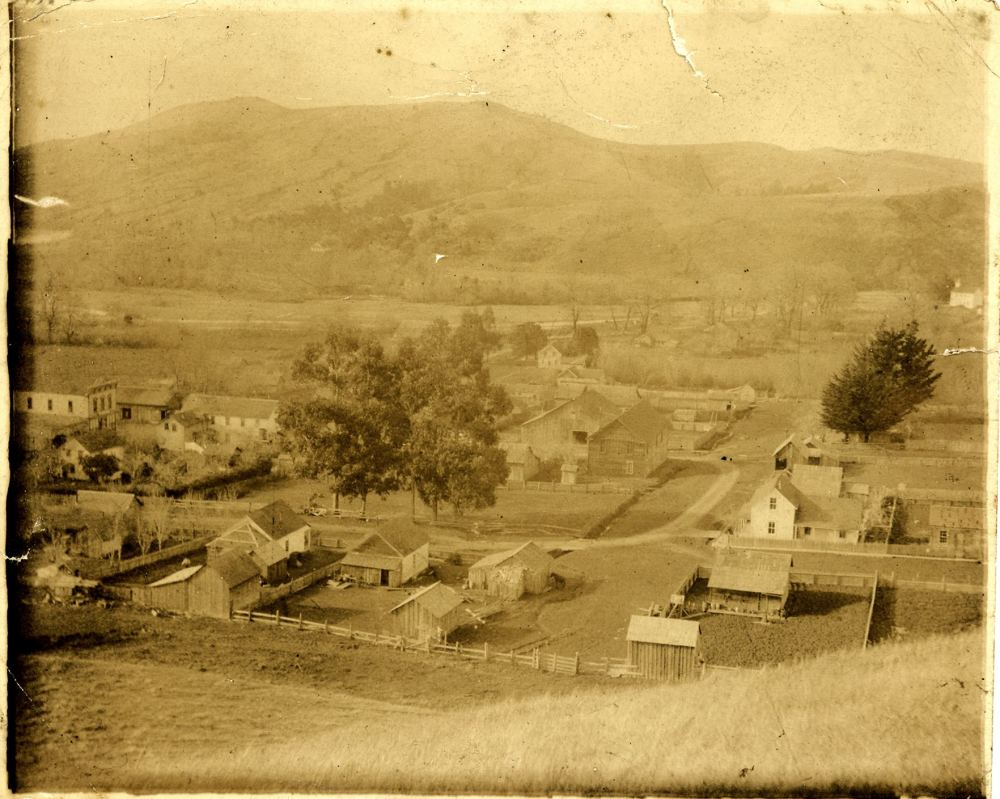
A pre-1903 fire photograph of Petrolia town square

Although it's often stated that Petrolia was first named "New Jerusalem," that area is 4–5 miles upstream. Petrolia was the site of the first oil well drilled in California. The oil lay in small, fractured underground pools and ultimately, attempts to extract it dried up; the site is now registered as California Historical Landmark #543.

The Mattole post office opened in 1863, and changed its name to Petrolia in 1865. A 1903 fire wiped out many buildings around the town square.

On March 9, 2020, a magnitude 5.8 earthquake occurred 86 km west of the town. The official time of the earthquake was 02:59:06 (UTC). 2660 people reported effects from the earthquake.

On December 5, 2024, a magnitude 7.0 earthquake occurred about 62 km/39 mi west of Petrolia, near the Mendocino triple junction.

== Economy ==
Local businesses include a bed and breakfast, an organic vineyard and winery, and an organic pick-it-yourself blueberry farm.

Petrolia has an abundance of marijuana growers. Marijuana has long since replaced the ranching and logging that sustained the original residents for generations.

Petrolia has a small general store that sells groceries and has one gas pump.

== Government ==
=== State and federal ===
In the state legislature, Petrolia is in the 2nd senatorial district, represented by Democrat Mike McGuire, and the 2nd Assembly district, represented by Democrat Chris Rogers.

Federally, Petrolia is in California's 2nd congressional district, represented by Democrat Jared Huffman.

== Facilities ==
It has a post office and a volunteer fire department. The original bell cast in 1871 for the Mattole School is still located at the school.

There are two community centers, the Mattole Valley Community Center (originally the school house from 1907 and moved across the street) that hosts Sunday Farmer's Market year round, quarterly community cabarets and other gatherings, and the Mattole Grange, an indoor and outdoor gathering area approximately five miles south of Petrolia that hosts a monthly pancake breakfast and farmers' market. There are community gardens, and various community clubs. A few miles outside town at the former Walker ranch is a 400 by 20 feet (121.9 by 6.1 m) underground steel and concrete vault, built by the Scientology organization called Church of Spiritual Technology to hold "the wisdom of the ages." The Church owns over 3,600 acres (1,500 ha; 5.6 sq mi) of land and the facility also includes a large caretaker's house and a guard house. The vault is one of several across the U.S. and is similar to Trementina Base. Prior to construction of this vault, on June 12, 1986, one of the oldest houses in the Petrolia area was deliberately burned by the Church of Spiritual Technology to clear the way for their construction, and symbols were cut in the ground above the vault to mark its location.

== Notable people ==
A number of writers and artists have made their home in Petrolia, including Alexander Cockburn, a left-wing journalist and founder of CounterPunch, Dale Maharidge, a journalist and winner of the Pulitzer Prize and violinist Jenny Scheinman.

Petrolia has a large population of environmental activists and hosts two environmental organizations, the Mattole Salmon Group and the Mattole Restoration Council, both dedicated to preserving the local wildlife and environment.

== Culture ==
The Mattole Valley Historical Society holds occasional public meetings in Petrolia and conducts community walking tours, slideshows and talks about the history of the area and its founders.

Community events including all-ages sporting events, town-wide talent shows, pancake breakfasts, and community meet-ups. In July of each year, the area hosts a music festival called "Roll on the Mattole", at the Mattole Grange, sponsored by the Honeydew Volunteer Fire Company. Twice a year, barbecues at the Mattole Grange attract families from all over the area; the July 4th and Labor Day weekend annual barbecues features an enormous barbecue pit of local beef and baked beans cooked in a vintage pot so large that they must be stirred with a canoe paddle. There are horse races in September, cycling tours in May–September, including a cycling/hiking tour of the Redwoods and the Tour of the Unknown Coast, a one-hundred mile bike race beginning and ending in Ferndale. A race called the "Rye and Tide" combines bicycling and running from downtown Petrolia along Lighthouse Road 7 miles (11 km) to the ocean. Besides the general store, the Sunday farmers' market and cafe at the Community Center, and a new food cart downtown, the closest amenities are located in Ferndale, approximately 33 miles (53 km), a trip of over an hour by car.

Because of its isolation, the Mattole Valley has cultivated a reputation for independence and self-sustenance, including a network of local resources—the maintenance of its own emergency help line (augmenting 9-1-1).

== See also ==
- Operation Green Sweep
