= Mattole =

Indigenous people of California

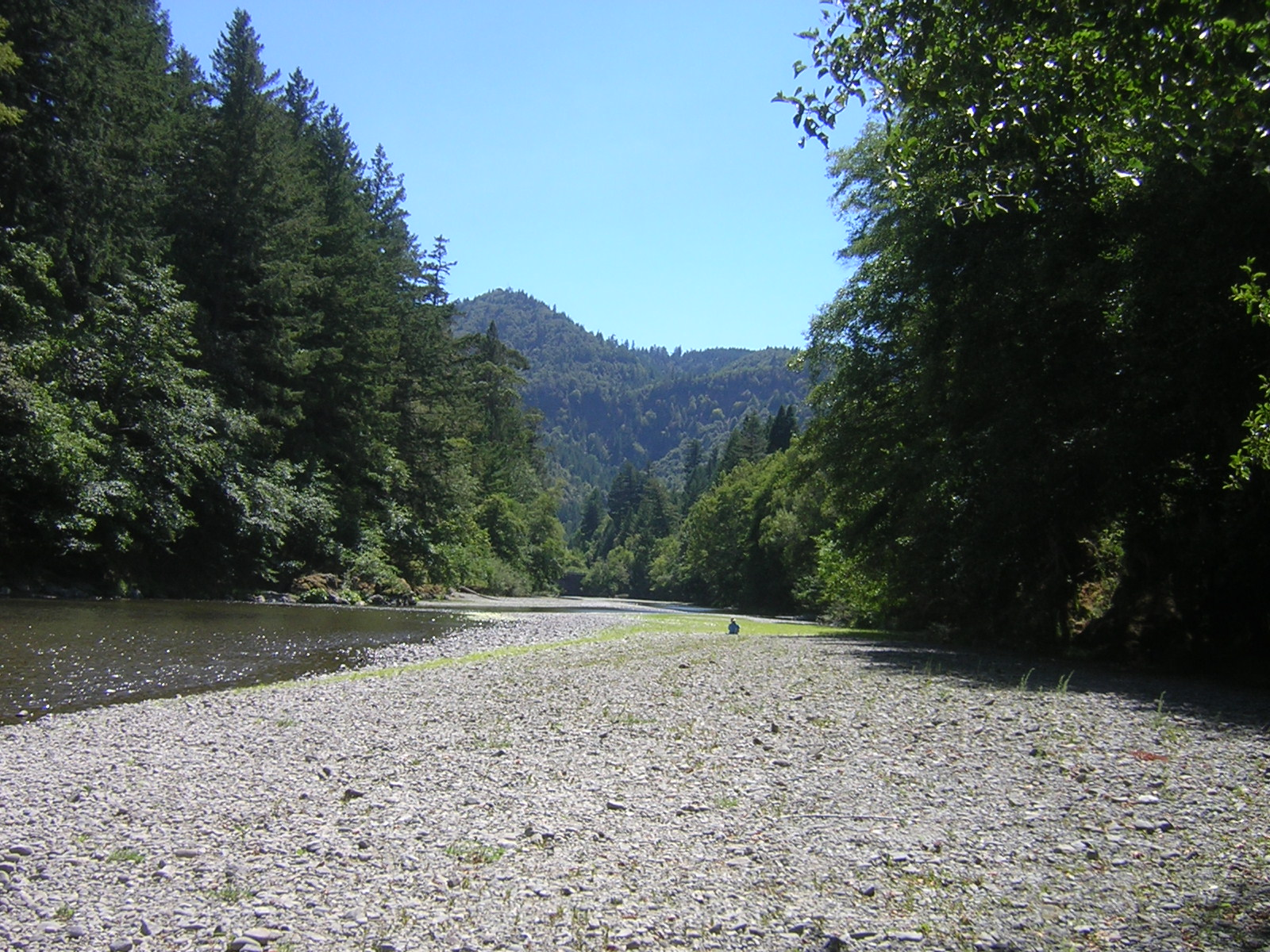
- Mattole River in Humboldt County

Regions with significant populations
- United States (California)

Languages
- English, historically Mattole

The Mattole, including the Bear River Indians, are a group of Native Americans in California. Their traditional lands are along the Mattole and Bear Rivers near Cape Mendocino in Humboldt County, California. A notable difference between the Mattole and other Indigenous peoples of California is that the men traditionally had facial tattoos (on the forehead), while other local groups traditionally restricted facial tattooing to women.

== Name ==
The Bear River Indians called themselves and the Mattole Ni'ekeni'. The Wailaki name was Tul'bush ("foreigners"); the Cahto name was Diideeʾ-kiiyaahaangn ("The North Tribe").

== Language ==
The Mattole spoke the Mattole language, an Athabaskan language that may have been closely related to that of their Eel River neighbors to the east. According to linguist Victor Golla, the last surviving person who could speak the Mattole language died in the 1950s.

== Territory ==
Historically, the Mattole lived along the Mattole River in the valley of Humboldt County, northwestern California. The Mattole lived in the area for a few centuries, but carbon dating revealed that many Native tribes have inhabited the land for over 6000 years. Earliest accounts say that the Mattole have been in the region of the Bear River tribe since the 16th century. From the mid-16th to the 19th centuries, the Mattole resided at the coast near the mouth of the river.

The Mattole were only permanent residents of a particular area through the winter months. For the most part, however, the Mattole people traveled in single family bands, traveling as necessary according to food abundance and better climate conditions.

Aboriginal Bear River villages included Tcalko', Chilsheck, Chilenche, Selsche'ech, Tlanko, Estakana, and Sehtla.

== Way of life ==
The Mattole's main food source has always been salmon. Salmon was a main food source because the Mattole were located along the Mattole river, which was abundant with Salmon. This also meant that the Mattole did not travel far from the river because that would mean abandoning their food source.

From the beginning of the tribe's 16th-century arrival in what is now Humboldt County, Mattole villages were essentially collective groups of families settling in close proximity over winter months. For the most part however, the Mattole people would travel in single family bands where necessary according to food abundance and better climate conditions, an easy feat with California's many microclimates. As warmer seasons set in the Mattole Valley, the Mattole would separate into their primary familial groups, becoming gatherers of vegetation more so than hunters as they would in colder months. As James Roscoe observed, "the simple family was by far the single most important social unit in Mattole society."

Tribes dealt with politics by electing tribesmen according to wealth and problem-solving skills rather than through bloodlines. These "chiefs", as they were later named, were not complete rulers, but leaders of a democracy who made suggestions that would be taken into account by the rest of the tribe and decided upon through popular vote.

== Post-contact history ==
In the mid- to late-19th century, tensions rose between white settlers and the Native Americans. In 1856 the Mendocino reservation was established for the Indian tribes. It ranged from Mendocino county to Bear River. When the white settlers began establishing their homes in the Mattole valley in 1857, there was much conflict among the Indian tribes. The white settlers argued that the reservation was claiming lands that it should not be. The Mattole felt threatened because the white settlers were moving into their area and taking their women. The white settlers and Indian tribes—including the Mattole, were ruthlessly killing each other. Prison camps housed many Mattole and other Native Americans. On September 4, 1858, amidst the constant fighting, the Mattole Valley Treaty of Peace was established.

Although the treaty seemed to be keeping the peace among both groups, it eventually became useless in 1859 when the reservation was no longer considered a reservation and more white settlers were coming in.

== Population ==
Estimates for the pre-contact populations of most Native groups in California have varied substantially. (See Population of Native California.) Alfred L. Kroeber put the 1770 population of the Mattole at 500. Sherburne F. Cook estimated the combined populations of the Mattole, Whilkut, Nongatl, Sinkyone, Lassik, and Kato at 4,700, at least 50% higher than Kroeber's figure for the same groups. Martin A. Baumhoff estimated the aboriginal Mattole-Bear River population as 2,476.

The Mattole federal reservation, the Rohnerville Rancheria, located south of Eureka, reported a population of 29 in the 2000 census.

The most recent US Census Bureau tabulation in 2010 reported that there were 14 members.

== Tribe today ==
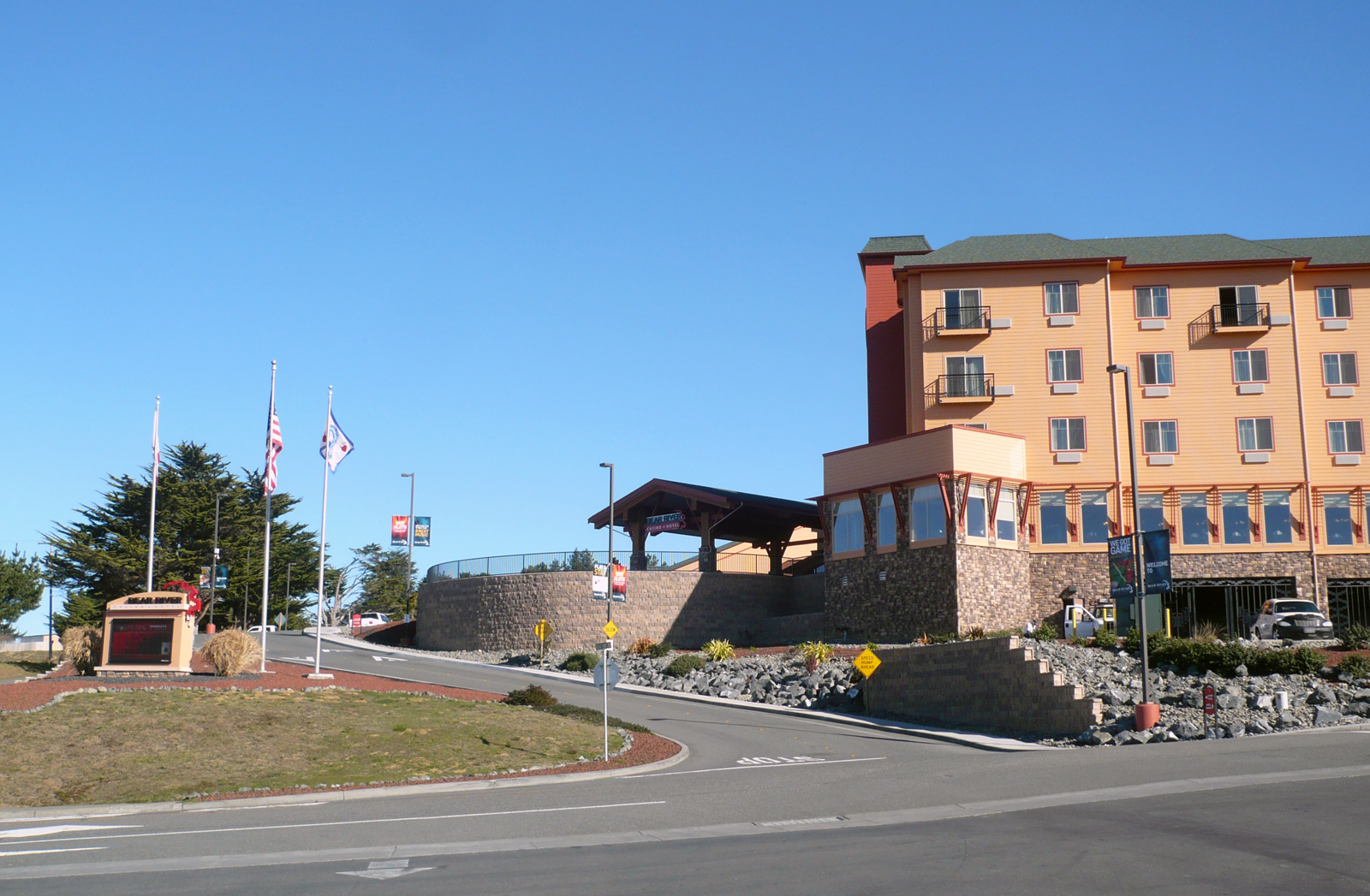
The Bear River Casino in Loleta, California

The Bear River Band of the Rohnerville Rancheria (Mattole River, Eel River (Wailaki), Bear River and Wiyot People) is now organized as a federally recognized tribe. It is located Humboldt County, California. The Bear River Band of Rohnerville Rancheria currently has 525 Enrolled Tribal Citizens, and enrollment into the Bear River Band is based on lineal descent and residency of the rancheria. The Bear River Band is governed by a Tribal Council, composed of seven members elected to four year terms. The current Chairwoman is Josefina Cortez and the current Vice Chairman is Edwin Smith. The tribe publishes the Bear River Bulletin newspaper for its members and also provides various services for the wellbeing of its members such as, social services, housing, economic development, and even daycare. The tribe operates the Bear River Casino, also in Loleta.

The Bear River Band is continuously trying to protect their cultural resources and ancestral territory. The Tribal Historic Officer (THPO) is in charge of the Tribal Historic Preservation Plans, which "emphasize the importance of the oral tradition, as well as consulting Tribal elders and spiritual leaders with special knowledge of the Tribe's traditions. They also have given emphasis to the importance of protecting 'traditional cultural properties,' places that are eligible for inclusion on the National Register of Historic Places because of their association with cultural practices and beliefs that are: (1) rooted in the history of the community; and, (2) are important to maintaining the continuity of that community's traditional beliefs and practices".

== See also ==
- Mattole traditional narratives
