= Honeydew, California =

Unincorporated community in the United States

Honeydew
- Unincorporated community
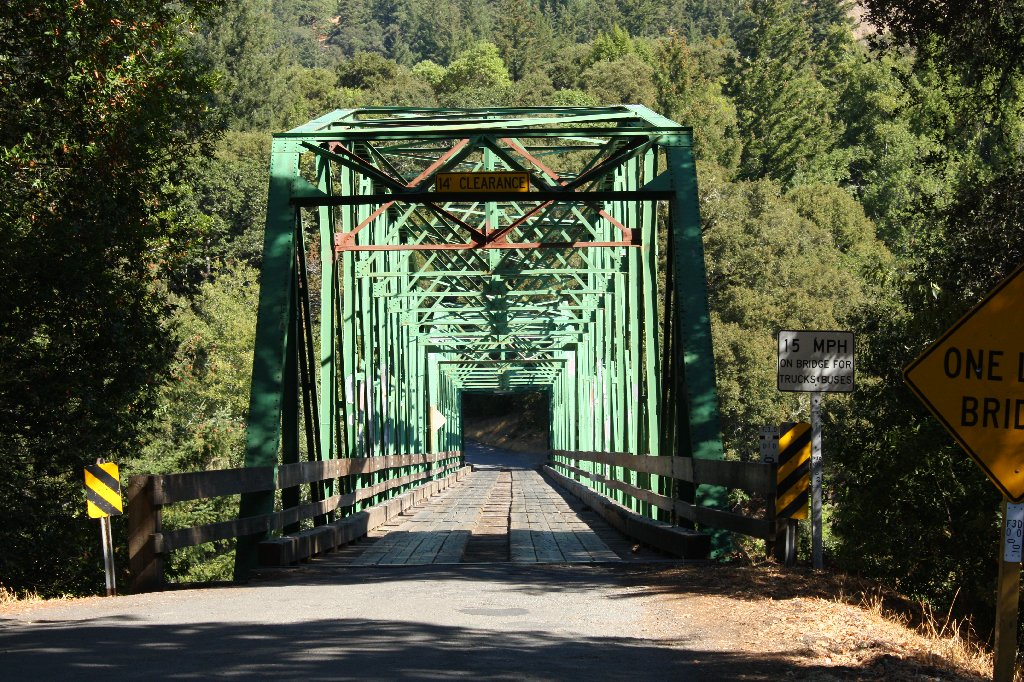
- Bridge over the Mattole River in Honeydew

- Location in California Honeydew (the United States)
- Coordinates: 40°14′40″N 124°07′22″W
- Country: United States
- State: California
- County: Humboldt
- Elevation: 322 ft (98 m)

Honeydew (formerly Honey Dew) is an unincorporated community in Humboldt County, California, United States. It is located 17 miles (27 km) south of Scotia at an elevation of 322 feet (98 m), on the Lost Coast of the Pacific Ocean, near the King Range mountains. There are a general store, elementary school, post office, and a few houses nearby. Many of the locals live in the hills surrounding the Mattole valley, named for the Mattole River, which runs through the valley. The ZIP code is 95545, and the community is inside area code 707.

== History ==
The first post office at Honeydew opened in 1926. Honeydew, Petrolia and Capetown were originally stagecoach and mail stops in the 1800s.

== Transportation ==
The steepness and related geotechnical challenges of the coastal mountains made this stretch of coastline too costly for state highway or county road builders to establish routes through the area, leaving it the most undeveloped portion of the California coast. California State Route 1, which runs along the coast for most of the route's length, ends at Leggett and merges with U.S. Route 101, which runs several miles inland at their junction.

There are three roads leading to Honeydew: Wilder Ridge Road comes from the neighboring southern Humboldt town of Garberville; the second runs from U.S. Route 101 through the Redwood forest; the third runs from Ferndale to the north. The Ferndale route, over what is locally known as "The Wildcat" (in reference to local history of petroleum extraction by workers known as "wildcatters") offers scenic views of the Pacific Ocean and the neighboring town of Petrolia. All three routes traverse twisting mountain roads, which can be treacherous during inclement weather, especially during coastal fog conditions. The valley itself lies at a confluence of warm and cool climates; just a few miles to the west, weather is often foggy and cool, while the interior valleys can reach summer temperatures of 100 °F (38 °C). Average rainfall totals around 100 inches (2,500 mm) per year.

It is wise for travelers in the area to prepare for quickly changing weather in all seasons as there is limited cellular coverage, available primarily nearest the Honeydew General Store and the river valley flats nearby, should emergency assistance be required. Electricity and access to the area can be interrupted in inclement weather. Those visiting the area are encouraged to check local road reports for any change in conditions. Vehicle fuel is generally—but not always—available at the General Store, and at Petrolia, 15 miles (24 km) to the west.

== Schools ==
There are three schools in the area: Honeydew Elementary School, Mattole Valley Triple Junction High School and Honeydew Charter School #159.

== Culture ==
Because of its isolated location, Honeydew retains a small-town atmosphere. There is no public lodging in the town, but there are several campgrounds nearby. The Honeydew Volunteer Fire Company organizes "Roll on the Mattole" every summer to raise their operating funds. The region has a long history of sheep and cattle ranching.

The Mattole Grange is the main gathering place for community events.

A locally owned development, including a hardware store and other shops about 1 mile (1.6 km) from the town center, submitted for approval in 2009, was approved by the Humboldt County Board of Supervisors in July 2013.

== Climate ==
The Köppen Climate Classification subtype for this climate is "Csb". (Mediterranean Climate). Honeydew is one of the rainiest communities in California receiving 85 inches per year on average with the nearby hills and mountainside receiving over 100.

Climate data for Honeydew, California
Month	Jan	Feb	Mar	Apr	May	Jun	Jul	Aug	Sep	Oct	Nov	Dec	Year
Mean daily maximum °F (°C)	50 (10)	55 (13)	60 (16)	64 (18)	71 (22)	78 (26)	86 (30)	87 (31)	83 (28)	70 (21)	56 (13)	49 (9)	67 (19)
Mean daily minimum °F (°C)	37 (3)	38 (3)	39 (4)	41 (5)	45 (7)	50 (10)	53 (12)	53 (12)	49 (9)	45 (7)	41 (5)	37 (3)	44 (7)
Average precipitation inches (mm)	14.96 (380)	14.39 (366)	12.51 (318)	6.03 (153)	2.14 (54)	0.79 (20)	0.08 (2.0)	0.06 (1.5)	0.74 (19)	4.04 (103)	9.31 (236)	19.09 (485)	84.14 (2,137.5)
Source: Western Regional Climate Center
