= Sugarloaf Island =

Sugarloaf Island may refer to:

- Sugarloaf Island (Alaska), one of the Barren Islands
- Sugar Loaf Island (California)
- Sugarloaf Island (South Shetland Islands)
- Mota Island, northern Vanuatu
- one of the Farallon Islands
