= Cape Mendocino Light =

Lighthouse in California, United States

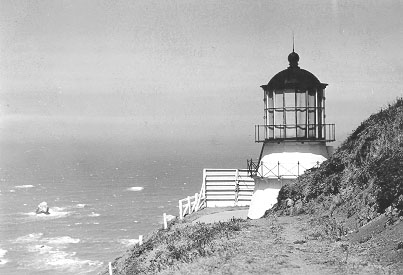
- Cape Mendocino Light (USCG) in its original location (pre-1998)
- Location: Cape Mendocino; California; United States
- Coordinates: 40°26′23.66″N 124°24′21.71″W

Tower
- Constructed: 1868
- Foundation: concrete base
- Construction: cast iron tower
- Automated: 1951
- Height: 43 feet (13 m)
- Shape: 16-sided frustum tower with balcony and lantern
- Markings: white tower, red lantern roof
- Operator: Cape Mendocino Lighthouse Preservation Society

Light
- Deactivated: 2013
- Focal height: 422 feet (129 m)
- Lens: First order Fresnel lens (removed)
- Characteristic: Fl W 15s.

Cape Mendocino Light was a navigation light at Cape Mendocino, California. The former lighthouse was relocated to Shelter Cove near Point Delgada, California in 1998, and the historic Fresnel lens to Ferndale, California, in 1948. An automated beacon operated for a number of years but was removed in May 2013.

== History ==
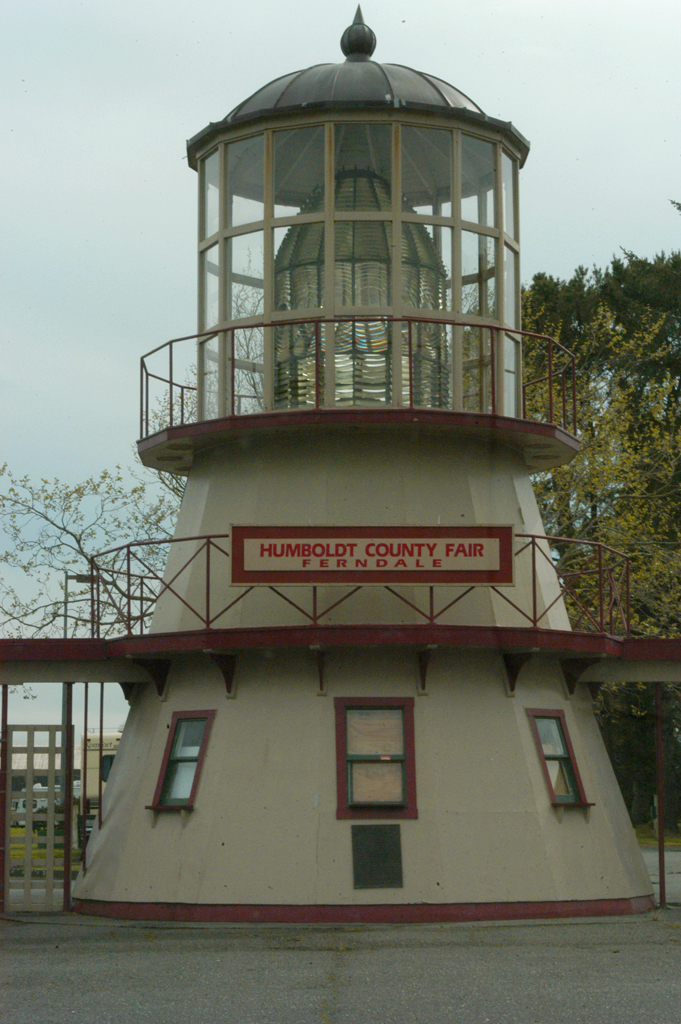
The Cape Mendocino Lens in the replica building at the Humboldt County Fairgrounds, Ferndale, California, in 2005 (40°35′13.45″N 124°15′53.17″W)

After many ships, including the SS Northerner and a lighthouse tender with supplies to build the facility, were lost to the jagged rocks surrounding the 326-foot (99 m) sea stack "Sugar Loaf" and Blunt's Reef offshore of Cape Mendocino, the lighthouse with attendant buildings including a carpenter shop, an oil house, a barn and a two-story residence were built on 171 acres (69 ha; 0.267 sq mi) of remote rangeland. On December 1, 1868, the light began sending a signal of one white flash every thirty seconds. The United States Coast Guard took control of the Cape Mendocino Lighthouse in 1939 when the United States Lighthouse Service merged with the Coast Guard.

The lighthouse was a 43-foot (13 m) iron tower, sixteen-sided and double balconied, a twin to the lighthouse at Point Reyes but for the roof shape. At 422 feet (129 m), the height of the light exceeded the 420 feet (128.0 m) Makapuu Point Light, making it the highest focal plane of any lighthouse in the United States. The lens had been shipped through Eureka, California and then overland to the remote location as it was too risky to ship it directly to the lighthouse. Also due to the remote location, lighthouse tenders serviced the facility. In 1881, three men being sent to the lighthouse were killed while attempting to land in a small boat from the tender Manzanita. New dwellings were built in 1908 for the keepers, some of whom raised cows or ponies for the Ferndale-to-Petrolia stagecoach line. At least ten keepers served this lighthouse from 1869 to 1926.

=== Shipwrecks and strandings ===
In 1905, the continuing danger from Blunt's Reef led to the installation of a lightship, which saved over 150 passengers of the steamer Bear after it ran aground in 1916. After five people were killed while trying to land lifeboats on the rocky shore, it was decided that the others would make for the Blunt's Reef lightship. The survivors clustered on the lightship until they could be taken ashore safely.

On 6 August 1921 the Alaska, built in 1889 by the Alaska Steamship Company, stranded and sank at Blunt's Reef off the California coast, showing that even the shore-mounted light and the lightship were not enough to save all passing ships.

In 1926, a keeper at the light was credited with saving the lives of all on board the Everett a steam schooner which he saw had caught fire. The keeper called for a rescue via telephone. When the ship arrived to help, they discovered the crew was unconscious from the fire fumes and saved them.

In 1941, the Blunt's Reef lightship saved the surviving crew of the SS Emidio, the first casualty of the Imperial Japanese Navy submarine force action on California's Pacific Coast.

=== Later history ===
After World War II, the original first order Fresnel lens was replaced by an automated rotating aerobeacon. On 24 December 1948, the Coast Guard loaned the lens to the City of Ferndale who dismantled it in 1949, moved it to town, built a replica lighthouse at the entrance to the Humboldt County Fairgrounds and reinstalled the lens there. In 2008, a Coast Guard inspection of the lens resulted in negotiations for the continued housing of the lens in Ferndale. The "Save Our Lens" group of local citizens raised $100,000 to dismantle and store the lens. By agreement with the Coast Guard in early September 2012, the lens was disassembled and put in temporary storage while the Ferndale Museum was remodeled to display it.

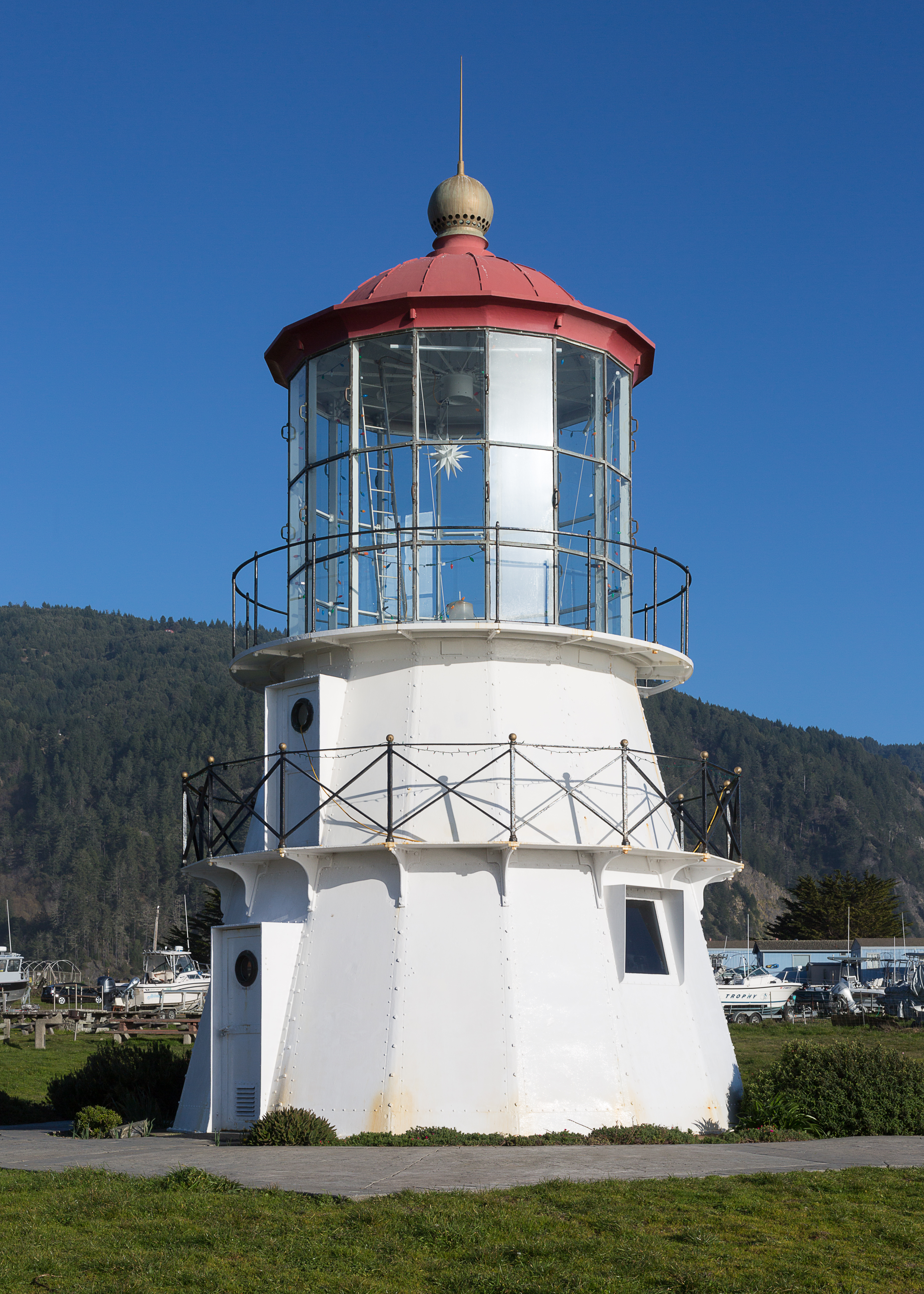
Cape Mendocino Light in Shelter Cove, 2016

The actual lighthouse building continued to deteriorate after being abandoned by the Coast Guard and in 1998 a group of volunteers dismantled the 1868 lighthouse, removed the lantern by Army National Guard helicopter and the remainder of the building by truck. Restored, fitted with new glass and painted by the Cape Mendocino Lighthouse Preservation Society, it was installed at Point Delgada in Mal Coombs Park (40°01′20″N 124°04′10″W) in Shelter Cove, California.

=== Current conditions ===
In 1951, the Coast Guard installed a dual aerobeacon, but this light was replaced by a simpler light with a focal plane of 515 feet (157 m), which flashed white every 15 seconds. The new light was located on a cliff about 350 yards (320 m) northwest and 93 feet (28 m) higher than the old light. The light was turned off on May 29, 2013. Aerial photos show the tower has been removed. While the original lighthouse was moved to Shelter Cove, and the keeper's residence demolished, the oil house is still at the site.

== See also ==
- List of lighthouses in the United States
