= Mattole language =

Extinct Athabaskan language of California

Mattole
- Mattole–Bear River
- Native to: United States
- Region: California
- Ethnicity: Mattole, Bear River
- Extinct: 1930s (Mattole) after 1922 (Bear River dialect)
- Language family: Na-Dené: Athabaskan; Pacific Coast Athabaskan; Mattole
- Dialects: Bear River

Language codes
- ISO 639-3: mvb
- Glottolog: matt1238
- Mattole is classified as Extinct by the UNESCO Atlas of the World's Languages in Danger.

Mattole, or Mattole–Bear River, is an extinct Athabaskan language once spoken by the Mattole and Bear River peoples of northern California. It is one of the four languages belonging to the California Athabaskan cluster of the Pacific Coast Athabaskan languages. It was found in two locations: in the valley of the Mattole River, immediately south of Cape Mendocino on the coast of northwest California, and a distinct dialect on Bear River, about 10 miles to the north. The Mattole have expressed interest in reviving their language.

Mattole and other California Athabaskan languages
