= Mattole traditional narratives =

Mattole traditional narratives include myths, legends, tales, and oral histories preserved by the Mattole and Bear River people living in the vicinity of Cape Mendocino in northwestern California.

Mattole oral literature combined elements typical of central California with influences from the Pacific Northwest. (See also Traditional narratives (Native California).)

== Sources ==
- Margolin, Malcolm. 1993. The Way We Lived: California Indian Stories, Songs, and Reminiscences. First edition 1981. Heyday Books, Berkeley, California.(Two Bear River Coyote myths, pp. 140, 147–148, from Nomland 1938.)
- Nomland, Gladys Ayer. 1938. "Bear River Ethnography". Anthropological Records 2:91-124. University of California, Berkeley. (Narratives, including Theft of Fire, pp. 118–123.)
- Powers, Stephen. 1877. Tribes of California. Contributions to North American Ethnology, vol. 3. Government Printing Office, Washington, D.C. Reprinted with an introduction by Robert F. Heizer in 1976, University of California Press, Berkeley. (Creation myth, p. 110.)
