= Operation Green Sweep =

Drug raids

- Part of the war on drugs
Date	November July 29, 1990 – August 9, 1990
Location	King Range National Conservation Area, Petrolia, California
Result	12 tons of growing equipment and 1400 marijuana plants were eradicated from federal land

Belligerents
United States	Illicit trafficking operators and marijuana growers

Commanders and leaders
Robert C. Thrasher CANG; Roger Bruckner BLM	No organizational structure

Strength
60 BLM agents, 110 California National Guardsmen and 60 7th Infantry U.S. Army soldiers, 7 Blackhawk helicopters, and 9 trucks	Unknown

Operation Green Sweep was a series of drug raids conducted by over 200 United States Army soldiers, National Guardsmen, and federal agents in Humboldt County, California. The operation was the first time active-duty troops were used to combat marijuana growing in the United States. The joint federal and state operation led by the Bureau of Land Management was centered around eradicating marijuana and removing agribusiness paraphernalia from the King Range National Conservation Area, federal land administered by BLM near Petrolia, California.

On July 29, 1990, a joint task force converged at a base camp in Humboldt County for what is known as Operation Green Sweep. The operation was led by the Bureau of Land Management and consisted of approximately 60 drug law enforcement agents, 110 California National Guardsmen and 60 regular U.S. Army soldiers from the 7th Infantry Division, the same unit that was used in the invasion of Panama during the previous December. This marked the first time that the government had ever used military force against its own citizens in a drug operation. It also established that law enforcement officials—now cooperating with U.S. military forces—have the ability to search, seize and detain, without warrant or probable cause, in the war on drugs. Property may be seized regardless of evidence and forfeited to the state or federal government without regards to the Fourth Amendment.

A contingent of 200 military troops conducted a massive marijuana eradication program where military helicopters flew overhead surveying residents, homes, and fields, and conducted road blocks, interrogations, and detentions. Violent demonstrations by Humboldt County locals against Green Sweep broke out. The first day of the raid resulted in the seizure of 200 marijuana plants and 700 pounds of farming equipment. Two eradication teams were deployed the very next day and seized a further 523 plants.

Eradication continued on August 1, resulting in 683 plants and 2.6 tons of growing paraphernalia confiscated from the local farmers. Local citizens began attempts to disrupt military communications in order to slow the progress of the raid, the military responded by introducing code words into Task Force radio nets. The operation continued several more days in August. The public continued to protest (sometimes violently) the actions of the military and federal officials. On August 3, local residents threatened a military laundry unit with a pistol and another group fired shots at a UH-60 helicopter.

Though the operation was scheduled to continue until August 10 all operations ceased on August 5, most likely due to the escalating demonstrations. The results from the property seized during Operation Green Sweep were: 1400 marijuana plants (worth approximately $2000 each) and 12 tons of growing equipment.
