= South Cape Mendocino State Marine Reserve =

Marine protected area on California's coast

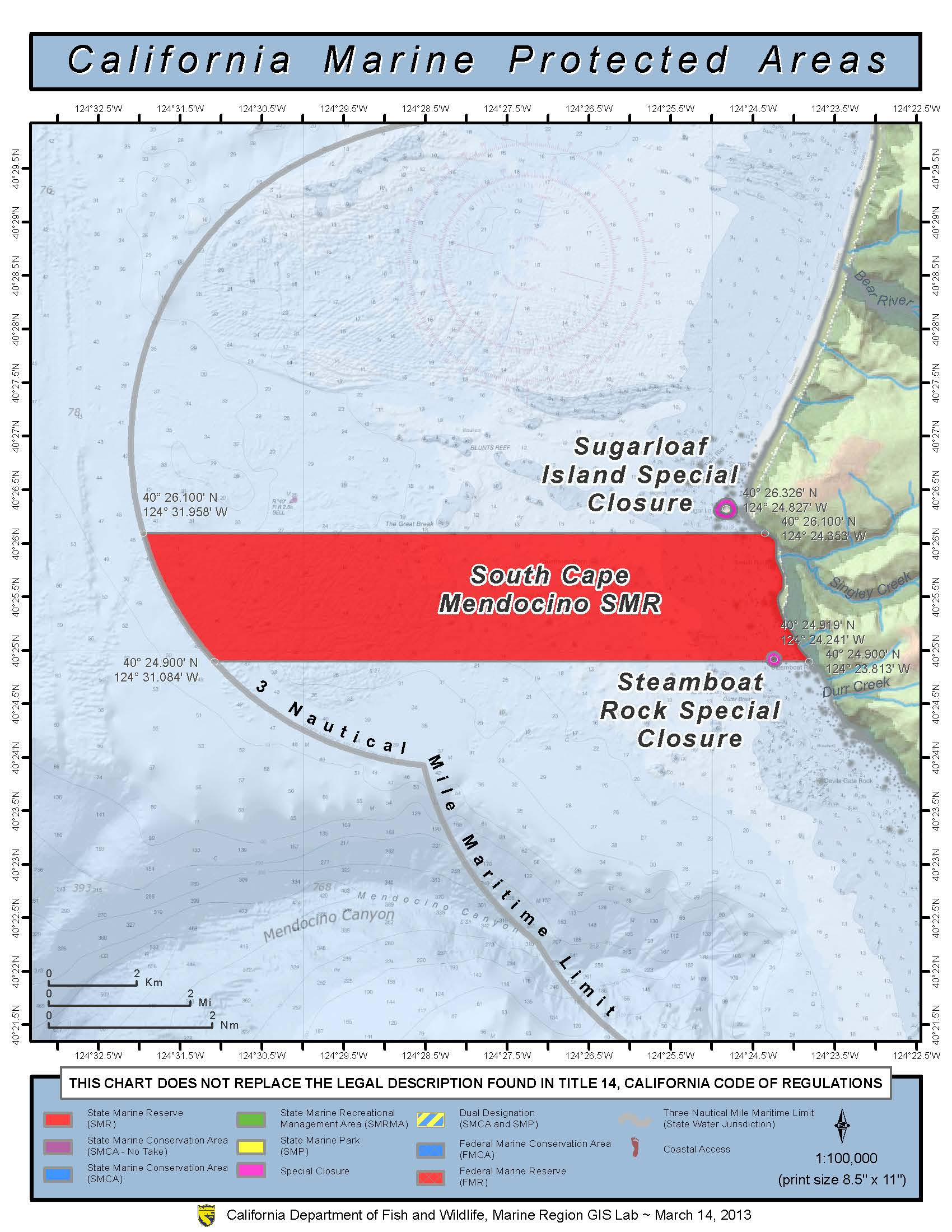
- Map of the South Cape Mendocino State Marine Reserve and Sugarloaf Island special zone

- Location within California
- Location: Humboldt County, California, US
- Nearest city: Ferndale, California
- Coordinates: 40°26′19.56″N 124°24′46.62″W
- Established: December 19, 2012
- Visitors: zero, fully protected
- Governing body: California Department of Fish and Wildlife

The South Cape Mendocino State Marine Reserve is an offshore marine protected area located off Cape Mendocino and the coastal town of Petrolia about 30 miles (48 km) south of Eureka. It marks California's westernmost point. The area is one of the most undeveloped sections of the California coast, and its waters are homes to important bird and mammal species. Within the South Cape Mendocino State Marine Reserve, the take of all living marine resources is prohibited.

== History ==
In June 2012, the California Fish and Game Commission voted unanimously 3-to-0 to designate waters in South Cape Mendocino State Marine Reserve, along with critical ocean habits in northern California, as Marine Protected Areas. The vote marked the completion of the United States' first state network of underwater parks, protecting California coastal areas and important wildlife and habitats, which help the state's tourism industry, hotels and restaurant that depend on healthy fish populations and beautiful coasts to attract guests. According to the National Ocean Economics Program, California's coast and ocean generate $22 billion in revenue and sustain 350,000 jobs each year. The South Cape Mendocino State Marine Reserve took effect on December 19, 2012.

== Geography ==
This area is bounded by the mean high tide line and straight lines connecting the following points in the order listed except where noted:

40° 26.100' N. lat. 124° 24.353' W. long.; 40° 26.100' N. lat. 124° 31.958' W. long.; thence southward along the three nautical mile offshore boundary to 40° 24.900' N. lat. 124° 31.084' W. long.; and 40° 24.900' N. lat. 124° 23.813' W. long.

== Habitat and Wildlife ==
Protection of the water South Cape Mendocino State Marine Reserve protects a wide range of biodiversity of habitats, including birds and seals, according to California state officials. The area provides essential habitat and breeding grounds to the Steller sea lion and its rocky outcroppings also provide resting places for California sea lions. South Cape Mendocino also provides key breeding grounds for the Western gull, double-crested cormorant, Brandt's cormorant, pelagic cormorant, black oystercatcher, pigeon guillemot and tufted puffin.

== Recreation and nearby attractions ==
The South Cape Mendocino area and its rock cliffs and pebble beaches draws windsurfers, tidepooling and wildlife viewing opportunities. The area is also known among hikers as the northern gateway to the Lost Coast. Cyclists know the cape as "The Wall" – a popular feature of the "Tour of the Unknown Coast" because of its tough 18-percent grade climb.
