= Capetown, California =

Locality in Humboldt County, California, US

Capetown
- Location in California Capetown (the United States)
- Coordinates: 40°28′00″N 124°22′05″W
- Country: United States

Capetown (formerly, Gas Jet and False Cape) is a locality in Humboldt County, California. It is located on the Bear River 3 miles (5 km) northeast of Cape Mendocino, at an elevation of 49 feet (15 m).

The Gas Jet post office operated from 1868 to 1876. The name referred to escaping gas from an oil well. The False Cape post office opened in 1870, changed the name to Capetown in 1879, and closed permanently in 1937.

Capetown is the westernmost settlement in the state of California.

== Climate ==
This region experiences warm (but not hot) and dry summers, with no average monthly temperatures above 71.6 °F (22.0 °C). According to the Köppen Climate Classification system, Capetown has a warm-summer Mediterranean climate, abbreviated "Csb" on climate maps.
