= Bear River (Humboldt County) =

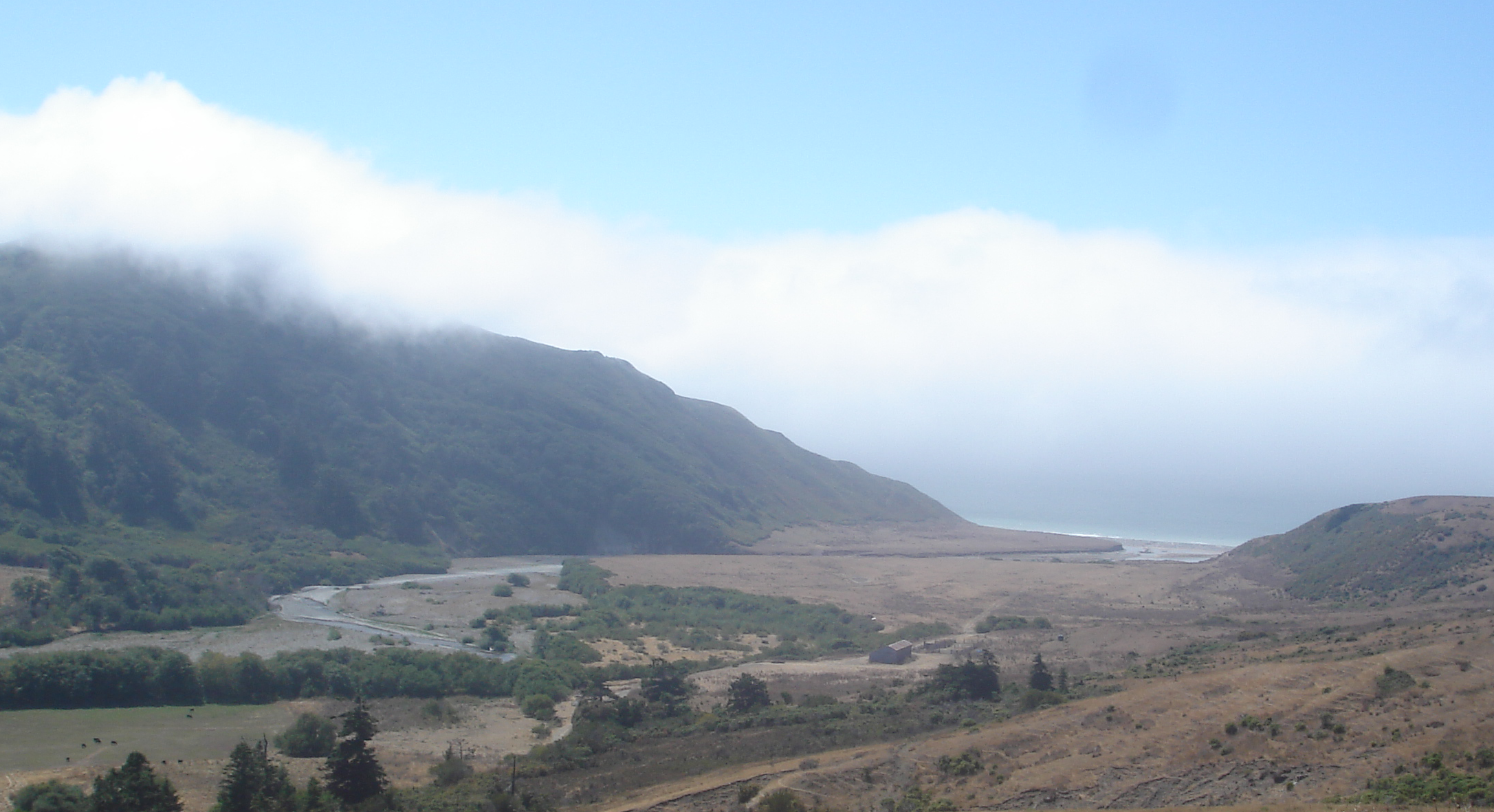
- Mouth of Bear River

Location
- Country: United States
- State: California
- Region: Humboldt County

Physical characteristics
- Source
  - coordinates: 40°21′24″N 124°03′11″W
- Mouth: Pacific Ocean
  - coordinates: 40°28′39″N 124°23′25″W
  - elevation: 0 ft (0 m)

Bear River is the largest Pacific coastal drainage basin between the Mattole River and the Eel River. Bear River drains the ranch pastures and forests of California Coast Ranges south of the Bear River Ridge extending easterly from False Cape along the False Cape shear zone of the Russ Fault. The river channel through undivided Cretaceous marine formations exposes younger Neogene, namely middle or lower Pliocene, marine sedimentary and metasedimentary rocks near the mouth, but lacks the well defined offshore submarine canyons of the Eel River to the north and the Mattole River to the south. Bear River reaches the Pacific after flowing westerly approximately 20 miles (32 km) from elevations above 2,000 feet (600 m) along the ridge above the Bull Creek drainage of Humboldt Redwoods State Park. Bear River provides the recreational and industrial water supply for the community of Capetown, California, and wildlife habitat including cold freshwater habitat for fish migration and spawning.

Bear River was named from the numerous bears seen there by early settlers. Alternatively, it was named after Lewis Keysor Wood of the Gregg party was mauled by a wounded bear near the river in 1850.

== See also ==
- List of rivers in California
