= Cape Mendocino =

Cape in Mendocino County, California, United States

Coordinates: 40.4401°N 124.4095°W

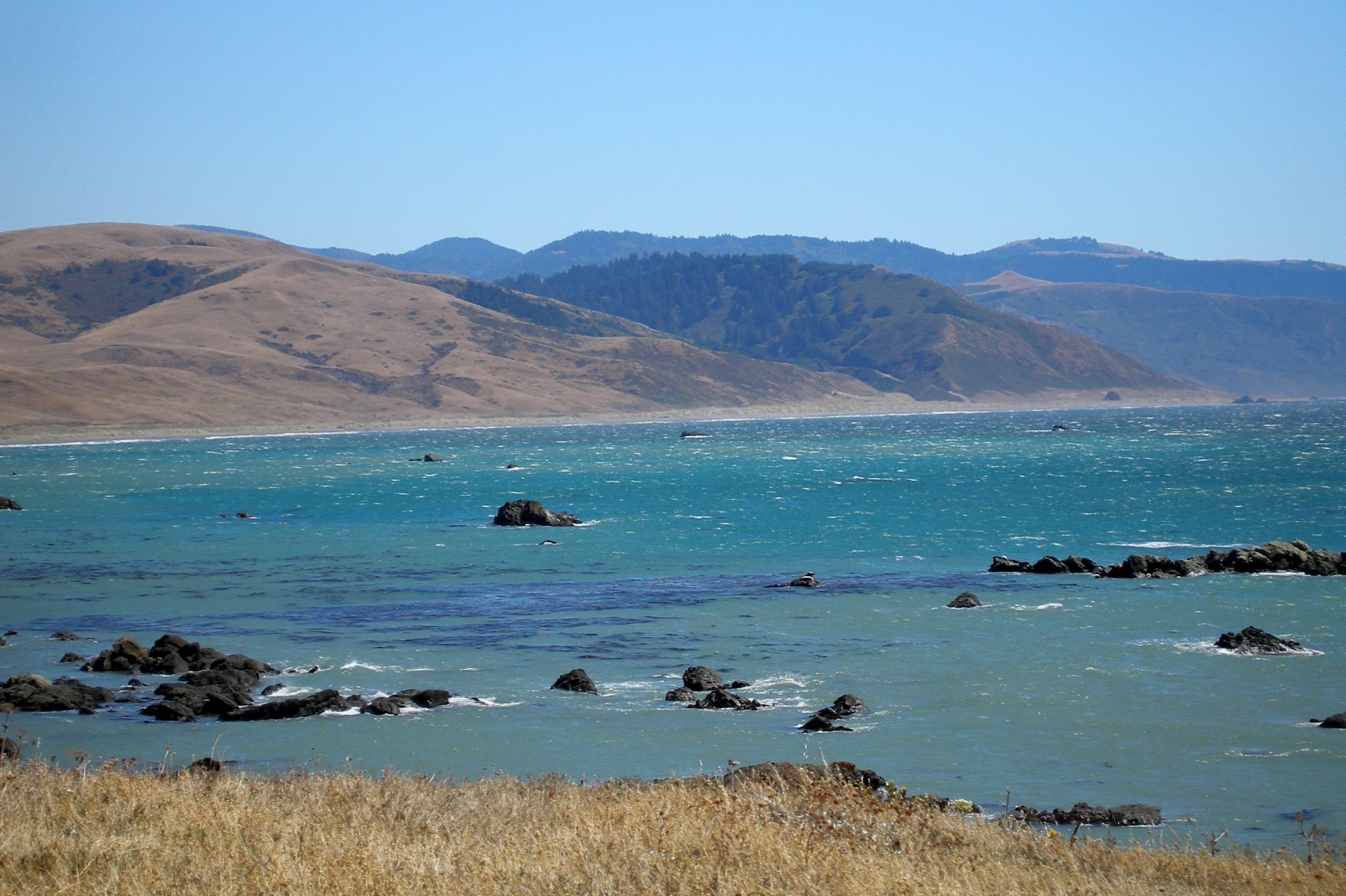
The Cape Mendocino Coast

Cape Mendocino (Spanish: Cabo Mendocino, meaning "Cape of Mendoza"), which is located approximately 200 miles (320 km) north of San Francisco, is located on the Lost Coast entirely within Humboldt County, California, United States. At 124° 24' 34" W longitude, it is the westernmost point on the coast of California. The South Cape Mendocino State Marine Reserve and Sugarloaf Island are immediately offshore, although closed to public access due to their protected status. Sugarloaf Island is cited as California's westernmost island.

== History ==
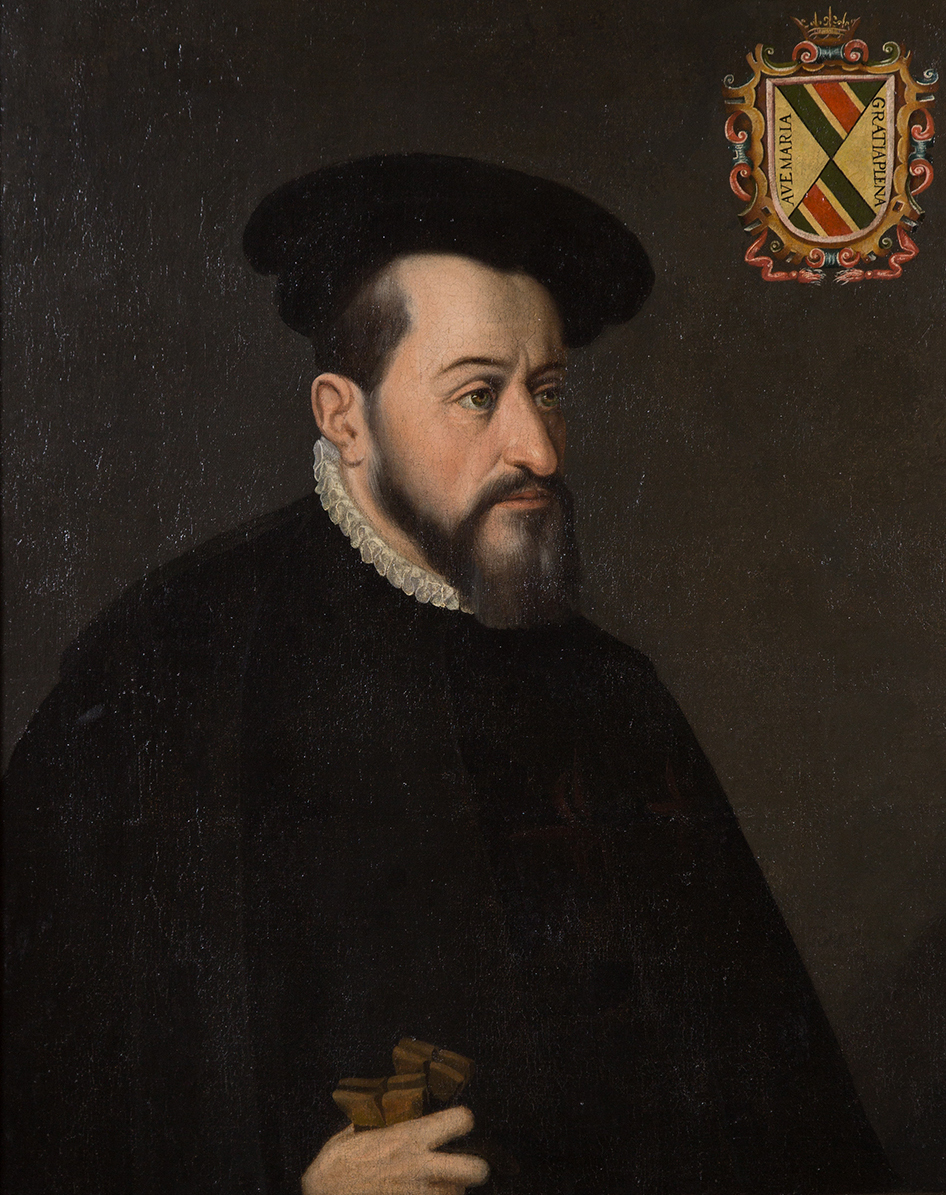
Antonio de Mendoza, the namesake of Cape Mendocino

It was named by 16th-century Spanish navigators to honor Antonio de Mendoza, Viceroy of New Spain, Cape Mendocino has been a landmark since the 16th century, when Manila Galleons followed the prevailing westerlies across the Pacific to the Cape, then followed the coast south to Acapulco, Mexico. The Cape Mendocino Light was lit on December 1, 1868, standing on eight prefabricated panels sent from San Francisco. An automated light stood near the original location but was removed in 2013.

== Geology ==
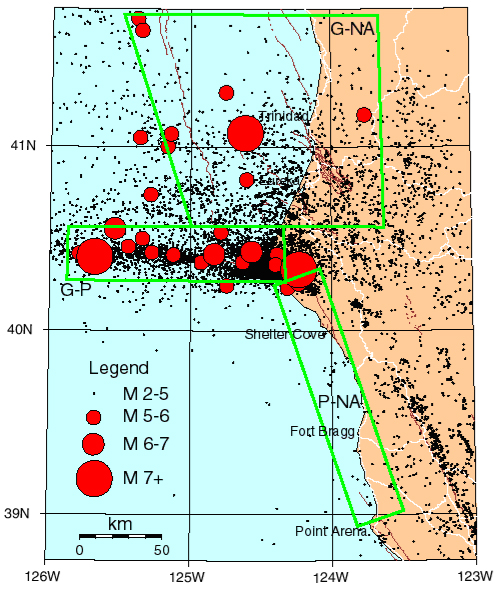
Regional Seismicity 1985–2003

The Cape Mendocino region of California's north coast is one of the most seismically active regions in the contiguous United States. Three earthquakes with epicenters nearby at the town of Petrolia and offshore west of Cape Mendocino, 25–26 April 1992, were outstanding, one reaching 7.2 M_{w}; shaking the town so badly, fires broke out and burned down historic buildings, including the 100-year old general store and the original post office. Even the fire station suffered so much shifting from the quakes, fire crews had a difficult time extinguishing the fires. The quakes demonstrated that the Cascadia subduction zone is both capable of producing large earthquakes and generating tsunamis. Many geologists and seismologists believe that the main shock in the 1992 sequence may be a forerunner of a much more powerful earthquake in the Pacific Northwest.

Offshore of Cape Mendocino lies the Mendocino triple junction, a geologic triple junction where three tectonic plates come together. The San Andreas Fault, a transform boundary, runs south from the junction, separating the Pacific plate and the North American plate. To the north lies the Cascadia subduction zone, where the Gorda plate is being subducted under the margin of the North American plate. Running west from the triple junction is the Mendocino Fault, the transform boundary between the Gorda plate and the Pacific plate. Cape Mendocino California is part of the Cascadia subduction zone.

== See also ==
- King Range (California)
