= California State Route 1 =

State highway in California, United States

State Route 1
- SR 1 highlighted in red; with relinquished, future, and unofficial portions in pink

Route information
- Maintained by Caltrans
- Length: 655.845 mi (1,055.480 km) (broken into 5 pieces by U.S. Route 101. Also, portions of SR 1 have been relinquished to or are otherwise maintained by local or other governments, and are not included in the length)
- Existed: 1934–present
- Tourist routes: Route One, Big Sur Coast Highway and Route One, San Luis Obispo North Coast Byway; Portions of the Cabrillo Highway in Santa Barbara and San Mateo Counties
- Restrictions: Special restrictions: No flammable or combustible tank vehicles in the Sepulveda Tunnel; No trucks with 4 or more axles through Malibu; No trucks over 3 short tons (2.7 t) through Lompoc; No explosives, flammables or combustibles in the Tom Lantos Tunnels; No trucks exceeding 30 feet kingpin to rearmost axle distance from Carmel to San Simeon

Major junctions
- South end: I-5 in Dana Point
- SR 133 in Laguna Beach; SR 55 in Newport Beach; I-10 in Santa Monica; US 101 at various locations; SR 46 near Cambria; SR 68 in Monterey; SR 17 in Santa Cruz; SR 92 in Half Moon Bay; I-280 in Daly City; SR 20 near Fort Bragg
- North end: US 101 in Leggett

Location
- Country: United States
- State: California
- Counties: Orange, Los Angeles, Ventura, Santa Barbara, San Luis Obispo, Monterey, Santa Cruz, San Mateo, San Francisco, Marin, Sonoma, Mendocino

Highway system
- State highways in California; Interstate; US; State; Scenic; History; Pre‑1964; Unconstructed; Deleted; Freeways
← I-980	→ SR 2

State Route 1 (SR 1) is a major north–south state highway that runs along most of the Pacific coastline of the U.S. state of California. At 656 miles (1,056 km), it is the longest state route in California, and the second-longest in the US after Montana Highway 200. SR 1 has several portions designated as either Pacific Coast Highway (PCH), Cabrillo Highway, Shoreline Highway, or Coast Highway. Its southern terminus is at Interstate 5 (I-5) near Dana Point in Orange County and its northern terminus is at U.S. Route 101 (US 101) near Leggett in Mendocino County. SR 1 also at times runs concurrently with US 101, most notably through a 54-mile (87 km) stretch in Ventura and Santa Barbara counties, and through a short stretch of northern San Francisco and southern Marin County that includes the Golden Gate Bridge.

The highway is designated as an All-American Road. In addition to providing a scenic route to numerous attractions along the coast, the route also serves as a major thoroughfare in the Greater Los Angeles area, the San Francisco Bay Area, and several other coastal urban areas. Though some maps and signs mark SR 1 as continuous through the cities of Dana Point, Newport Beach, Santa Monica, and Oxnard, control of segments within those cities were relinquished to those local jurisdictions and are thus no longer officially part of the state highway system. The Golden Gate Bridge is also officially not included in the state highway system because it is maintained locally by the Golden Gate Bridge, Highway and Transportation District.

SR 1 was built piecemeal in various stages, with the first section opening in the Big Sur region in the 1930s. However, portions of the route had several names and numbers over the years as more segments opened. It was not until the 1964 state highway renumbering that the entire route was officially designated as SR 1. Although SR 1 is a popular route for its scenery, frequent landslides and erosion along the coast have caused several segments to be either closed for lengthy periods for repairs or re-routed inland.

== Route description ==
Due to its fragmented nature and piecemeal relinquishments, the California Streets and Highways Code defines Route 1 across several subdivisions of section 301 as follows:

Route 1 is from:

(a) Route 5 south of San Juan Capistrano to Route 101 near El Rio except for the portions of Route 1 relinquished:

- (1) Within the city limits of the City of Dana Point between the western edge of the San Juan Creek Bridge and Eastline Road at the city limits of the City of Laguna Beach.
- (2) Within the city limits of the City of Newport Beach between Jamboree Road and Newport Coast Drive.
- (3) Within the city limits of the City of Santa Monica between the southern city limits and Route 10.
- (4) Within the city limits of the City of Oxnard between Pleasant Valley Road and Route 101.

(b) Route 101 at Emma Wood State Beach, 1.3 miles north of Route 33, to Route 101, 2.8 miles south of the Ventura-Santa Barbara county line at Mobil Pier Undercrossing.
(c) Route 101 near Las Cruces to Route 101 in Pismo Beach via the vicinity of Lompoc, Vandenberg Air Force Base, and Guadalupe.
(d) Route 101 in San Luis Obispo to Route 280 south of San Francisco along the coast via Cambria, San Simeon, and Santa Cruz.
(e) Route 280 near the south boundary of the City and County of San Francisco to Route 101 near the approach to the Golden Gate Bridge in San Francisco.
(f) Route 101 near the southerly end of Marin Peninsula to Route 101 near Leggett via the coast route through Jenner and Westport.

The definition omits Route 1's concurrencies with Routes 101 and 280 instead of duplicating those segments in the other routes' definitions in the code. And while control of the former portions of Route 1 have been relinquished by the state to the cities of Dana Point, Newport Beach, Santa Monica, and Oxnard, section 301 subdivision (g) further mandates that those cities must still "maintain within their respective jurisdictions signs directing motorists to the continuation of Route 1". In addition to the relinquished portions listed under subdivision (a), sections 301 subdivision (h), 301.1, 301.3, 303.4 and 301.5 of the code permit the state to relinquish control of select or all portions of Route 1 in the cities of Los Angeles, Torrance, Newport Beach, Laguna Beach and Pismo Beach respectively.

SR 1 is part of the California Freeway and Expressway System, and through the Los Angeles metro area, Monterey, Santa Cruz, and San Francisco metro area is part of the National Highway System, a network of highways that are considered essential to the country's economy, defense, and mobility by the Federal Highway Administration.

The Big Sur section from San Luis Obispo to Carmel is an official National Scenic Byway. SR 1 is eligible to be included in the State Scenic Highway System; however, only a few stretches between Los Angeles and San Francisco have officially been designated as a scenic highway, meaning that there are substantial sections of highway passing through a "memorable landscape" with no "visual intrusions", where the potential designation has gained popular favor with the community.

The entire route is designated as a Blue Star Memorial Highway to recognize those in the United States armed forces; this designation is sponsored by the California Garden Clubs, but the organization has not erected such markers along SR 1 yet. In 1959, the legislature officially designated the segment in Southern California between Interstate 5 (I-5) in Dana Point and US 101 near Oxnard as the Pacific Coast Highway (commonly referred to as "PCH", without the definite article "the", unlike other freeway numbers in the Los Angeles area). Between US 101 at the Las Cruces junction (8 miles [13 km] south of Buellton) and US 101 in Pismo Beach, and between US 101 in San Luis Obispo and Interstate 280 in San Francisco, the legislature also designated SR 1 as the Cabrillo Highway in 1959, after the explorer Juan Rodríguez Cabrillo who sailed along the coast line. The legislature also designated the route as the Shoreline Highway in 1957 between the Manzanita Junction near Marin City and Leggett. Smaller segments of the highway have been assigned several other names by the state and municipal governments.

For the most part, SR 1 runs parallel to the coastline, or close to it, but does turn several miles inland at various locations to avoid several federally controlled or protected areas such as Vandenberg Space Force Base, Diablo Canyon Power Plant and Point Reyes National Seashore. In addition to connecting the coastal cities and communities along its path, the route provides access to beaches, parks, and other attractions along the coast, making it a popular route for tourists. The route annually helps bring several billion dollars to the state's tourism industry. Segments of SR 1 range from urban freeway to simple rural two-lane road. Under the California Coastal Act, those segments of the highway that run through the rural areas of the protected California Coastal Zone may not be widened beyond a scenic two-lane road.

=== Orange County ===
At its southernmost end in Orange County, SR 1 terminates at I-5 in Capistrano Beach in Dana Point. It then travels west into the city center. After leaving Dana Point, Pacific Coast Highway (PCH) becomes simply "Coast Highway" while at the same time continuing northwest along the coast through Laguna Beach (where it meets the southern terminus of SR 133) and Crystal Cove State Park.

SR 1 then enters Newport Beach and passes through several affluent neighborhoods, including Newport Coast and Corona Del Mar, spans the entrance to the Upper Newport Bay, which marks the boundary between East Coast Highway and West Coast Highway, and crosses California State Route 55 near its southern terminus. Upon crossing the Santa Ana River mouth and entering Huntington Beach, SR 1 regains the Pacific Coast Highway designation. It passes Huntington State Beach and the southern terminus of California State Route 39 before reaching Bolsa Chica State Beach and the Bolsa Chica Ecological Reserve. PCH then continues along the coast into Seal Beach, the final city on its journey in Orange County.

=== Los Angeles and Ventura counties ===
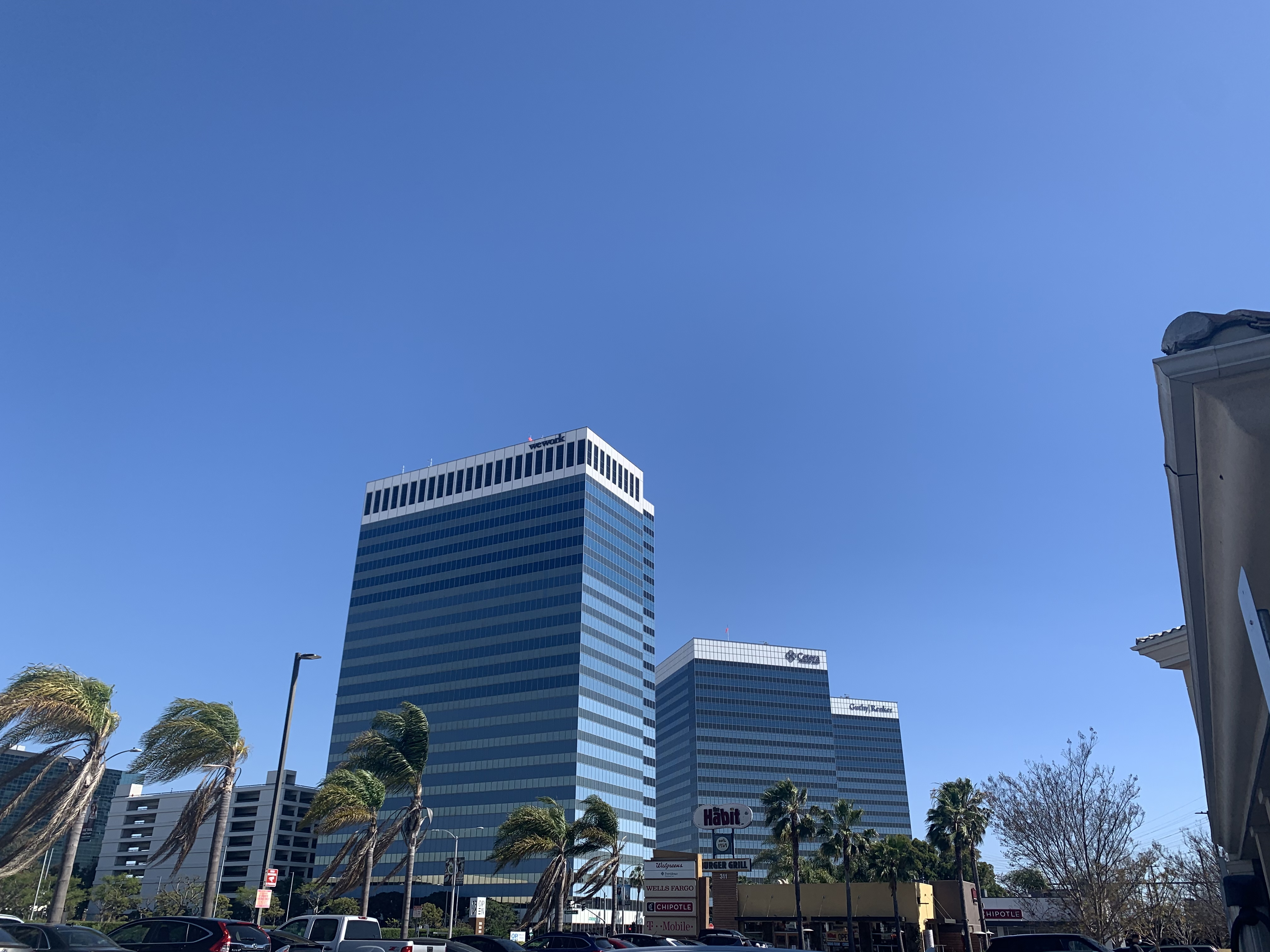
The Pacific Corporate Towers alongside PCH in El Segundo, California

PCH enters Los Angeles County and the city of Long Beach after crossing the San Gabriel River. SR 1 then continues northwest through the city to its junction with Lakewood Boulevard (State Route 19) and Los Coyotes Diagonal at the Los Alamitos Circle, more than 2 miles (3.2 km) from the coast. From the traffic circle, it continues inland west through Long Beach, including approximately one mile adjacent to the southern boundary of Signal Hill. PCH is marked as such in Long Beach, but originally bore the name of Hathaway Avenue east of the traffic circle and State Street west of there. PCH then passes through the Los Angeles districts of Wilmington and Harbor City. While bypassing the immediate coastline of Palos Verdes, SR 1 continues to head west into the cities of Lomita and Torrance along the route of the former Redondo-Wilmington Boulevard.

PCH then turns north through Redondo Beach and Hermosa Beach. Upon entering Manhattan Beach, it becomes Sepulveda Boulevard and turns back into PCH designation through El Segundo. At Imperial Highway, it regains the name Sepulveda Boulevard as it descends and passes under two runways of Los Angeles International Airport (LAX) via the Airport Tunnel.

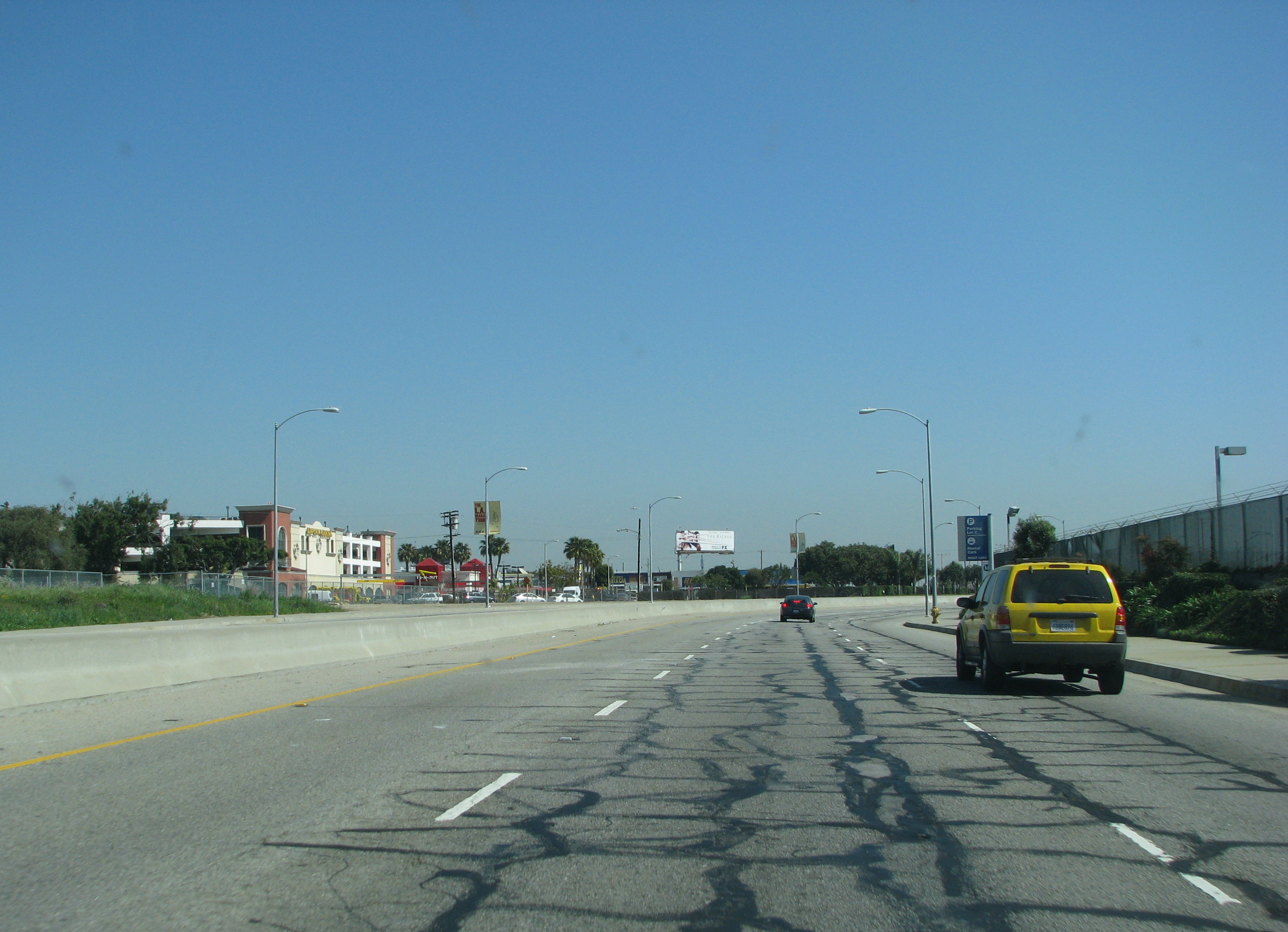
Southbound SR 1 near the intersection of Lincoln and Sepulveda Boulevards north of LAX

After leaving LAX, SR 1 splits from Sepulveda and turns northwest, becoming Lincoln Boulevard and passing through the Los Angeles neighborhoods of Westchester, Playa Vista, and Venice, as well as the unincorporated community of Marina Del Rey. This portion of SR 1 suffers heavy congestion at most times due to the shortage of alternate north-south arterial roads west of Interstate 405. It then enters the city of Santa Monica, where SR 1 turns southwest, merging onto the westernmost segment of the Santa Monica Freeway. Passing through the McClure Tunnel (which also serves as the national western terminus of Interstate 10), SR 1 emerges along the beachfront in Santa Monica as PCH again and continues along the coast, separated from Downtown Santa Monica by the palisades north of Santa Monica Pier; this portion is also known locally as Palisades Beach Road and formerly as Roosevelt Highway. Upon leaving Santa Monica, PCH continues to follow the coast, curving west through the Pacific Palisades neighborhood of Los Angeles before becoming the main thoroughfare of the city of Malibu while traversing the entire 21 miles (34 km) of that city.

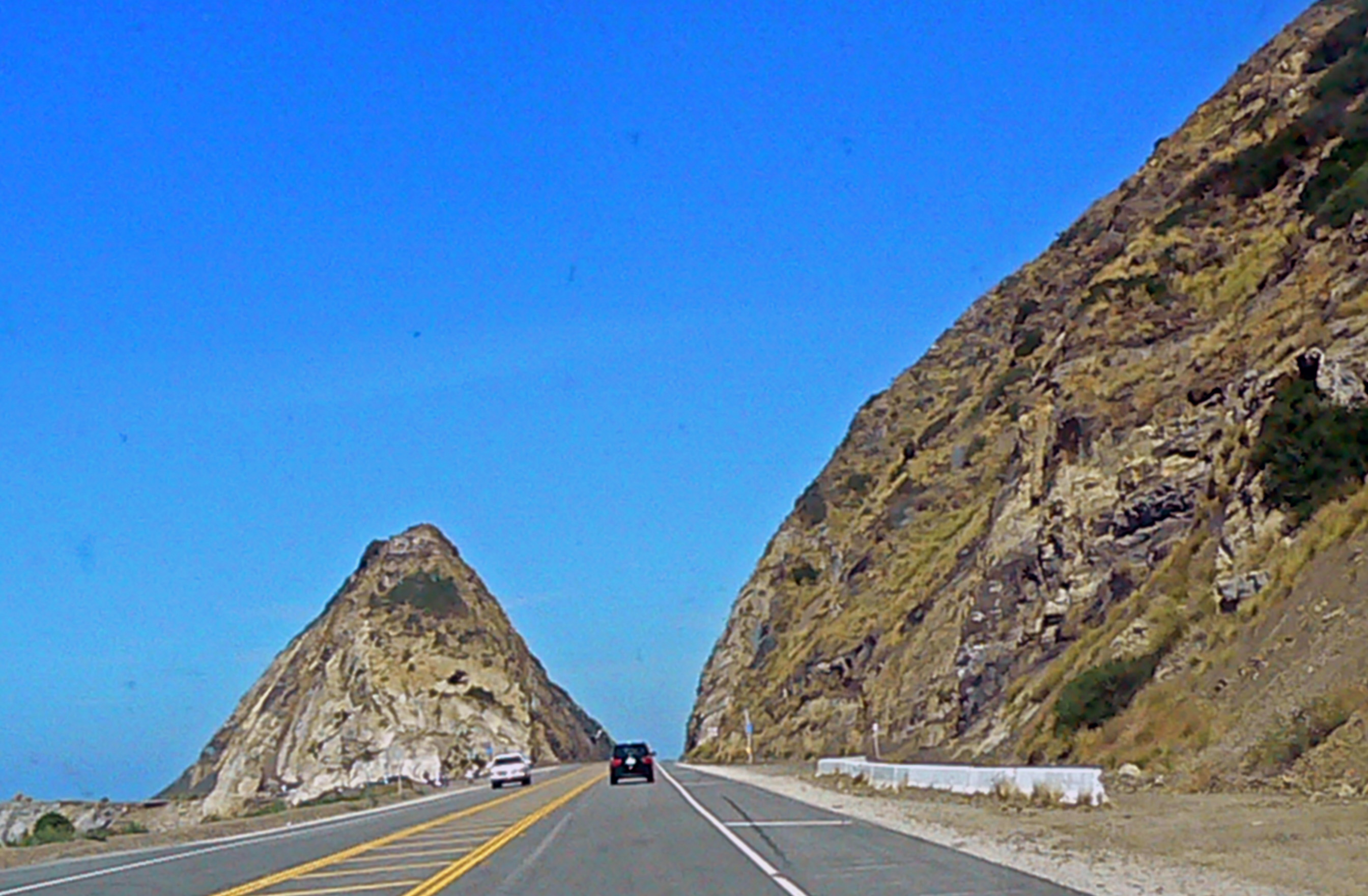
PCH passing Mugu Rock at Point Mugu

SR 1 crosses the county line and continues through the Ventura County portion of the Malibu coast through Leo Carrillo State Park and Point Mugu State Park. After passing through a notch in the promontory that marks Point Mugu, the western end of the Santa Monica Mountains, and the beginning of the Oxnard Plain. The road cut left a very large rock formation at the tip of the point that is called the Mugu Rock. At that point, PCH leaves the coast and heads north, and then northwest as a freeway along the northeastern boundary of Naval Base Ventura County Point Mugu for several miles to an interchange at Rice Avenue, Pleasant Valley Road, and Oxnard Boulevard in Oxnard. The reconstructed interchange at Rice Avenue and Pleasant Valley Road channels traffic north on the surface street, Rice Avenue, towards the interchange with US 101. The historic route along Oxnard Boulevard was relinquished in 2014. Truck traffic to and from the Port of Hueneme also uses this designated route at the Rice Avenue/Hueneme Road connector to connect with Route 101 at the Rice Avenue Interchange.

After traveling through Ventura, SR 1 separates from US 101 to travel the historic beach route along the Rincon coast that was originally opened up by the construction of the Railroad Coastal Route from Emma Wood State Beach to the Mobil Pier Undercrossing near Sea Cliff, where it rejoins US 101 about 3 miles (4.8 km) south of the Santa Barbara County line near La Conchita.

=== Central Coast ===
The US 101/SR 1 concurrency (although actual signage mentioning SR 1 through this segment is nonexistent) from the Mobil Pier Undercrossing runs for 54 miles (87 km), passing through the City of Santa Barbara and its neighboring communities along the coast of Santa Barbara County. The route then turns away from the Gaviota Coast at Gaviota State Beach, avoiding Point Conception, and heads due north through Gaviota State Park and the Gaviota Tunnel. In Las Cruces, SR 1, now named Cabrillo Highway, splits again from US 101 and heads northwest to the city of Lompoc. It is briefly joined with SR 246 along Lompoc's east–west Ocean Avenue, before turning north as H Street to Harris Grade Road, where it then regains the Cabrillo Highway name.

After reaching the main entrance to Vandenberg Space Force Base, SR 1 turns northeast, away from the immediate coastline of the base, to join SR 135. SR 135 then splits from SR 1 south of Orcutt, and the Cabrillo Highway turns northwest back towards the coast to Guadalupe. It enters San Luis Obispo County, avoiding the immediate coastline of the protected Guadalupe-Nipomo Dunes, before passing through Grover Beach and subsequently joining US 101 for the third time at Pismo Beach. The US 101/SR 1 concurrency then avoids the immediate coastline of Avila Beach and Diablo Canyon Power Plant, and instead heads straight inland to San Luis Obispo.

SR 1 splits from US 101 at Santa Rosa Street in San Luis Obispo and then resumes as a four-lane road as the Cabrillo Highway. It rejoins the coast in Morro Bay, running through that city as a freeway, where it crosses Morro Creek at the site of a prehistoric Chumash settlement dating to the Millingstone Horizon. From there, SR 1 proceeds north to Cayucos until it again becomes a winding, two-lane road with occasional passing lanes. It then continues along the coast through Cambria and San Simeon, and past the elephant seal colony at Piedras Blancas Light Station. SR 1 provides access to Hearst Castle in San Simeon in Northern San Luis Obispo County.

=== Big Sur ===
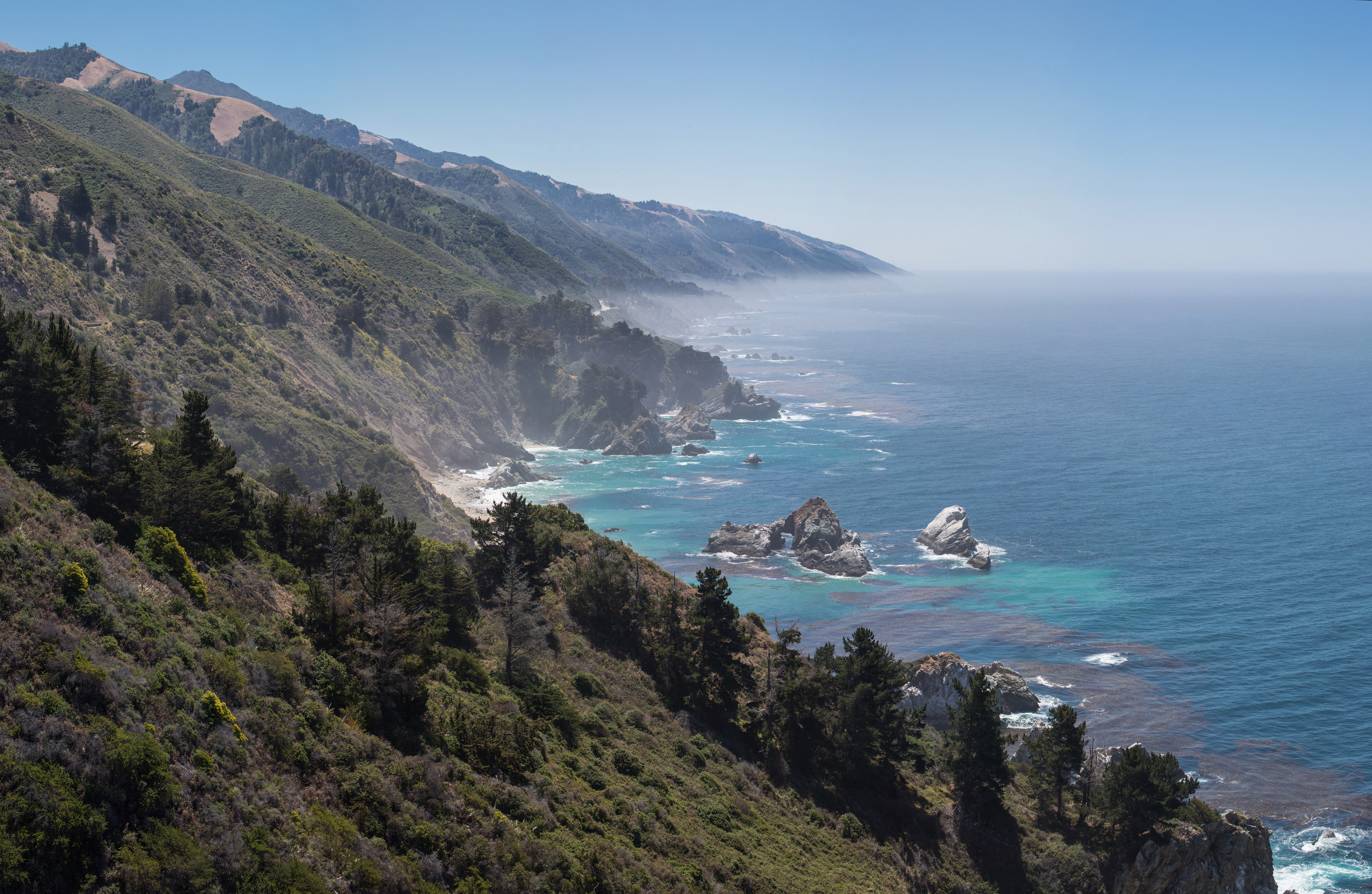
Looking south, showing the McWay Rocks, about 16 mi (26 km) south of Big Sur

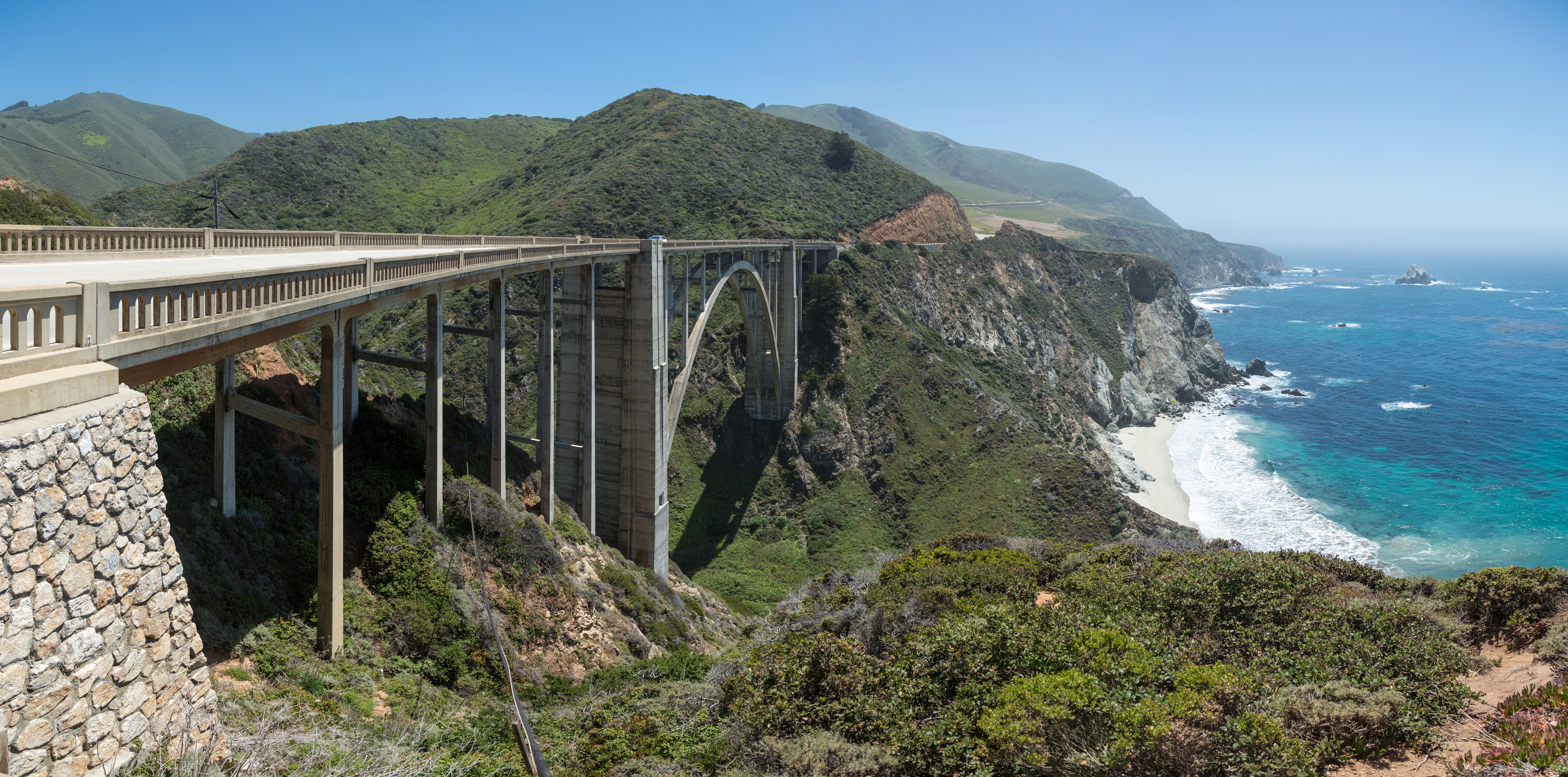
The Bixby Bridge in Big Sur

SR 1 then enters the Big Sur region, crossing San Carpóforo Creek just south of the Monterey County line. For about 72 miles (116 km) from San Carpóforo Creek to Malpaso Creek, the road winds and hugs the cliffs of Big Sur, passing various coastal parks in the area, with no connection to the other side of the Santa Lucia Mountains except for Nacimiento-Fergusson Road. The road briefly leaves the coast for a few miles, passing through a redwood forest in the Big Sur River valley. The Big Sur segment of the highway, built between 1919 and 1937, also crosses a number of historic bridges, including the scenic Bixby Bridge, a reinforced concrete arch with a 320-foot (98 m) span that passes over the Bixby Creek gorge, the Rocky Creek Bridge, and the Big Creek Bridge. The segment of SR 1 through Big Sur is "considered one of the most beautiful drives in the world" and "attracts tourists from all over the world".

=== Monterey Bay Area ===
After crossing the Carmel River, SR 1 turns inland and runs along the eastern boundary of Carmel and the western boundary of Carmel Valley before becoming a freeway in Monterey. After bypassing the immediate coastline of Pebble Beach and the rest of the Monterey Peninsula, the freeway heads north along the coast of Monterey Bay through Sand City, Seaside, and Marina. At the interchange with SR 156 near Castroville, SR 1 continues north as a two-lane rural road to Moss Landing.

SR 1 becomes a freeway once again just before entering into Santa Cruz County. This four-lane freeway continues up the Monterey Bay coast through Watsonville to its interchange with SR 17 in Santa Cruz. (This trumpet interchange is locally known as The Fishhook due to its tight loop ramps that resemble a fishhook when viewed from above). After a short expressway section, it skirts downtown Santa Cruz as four-lane Mission Street, regaining the Cabrillo Highway designation (local/historic name is "Coast Road") after it leaves the city and continues north-west as a two-lane road (with occasional four-lane sections) up the coast through Davenport.

=== San Francisco Bay Area ===
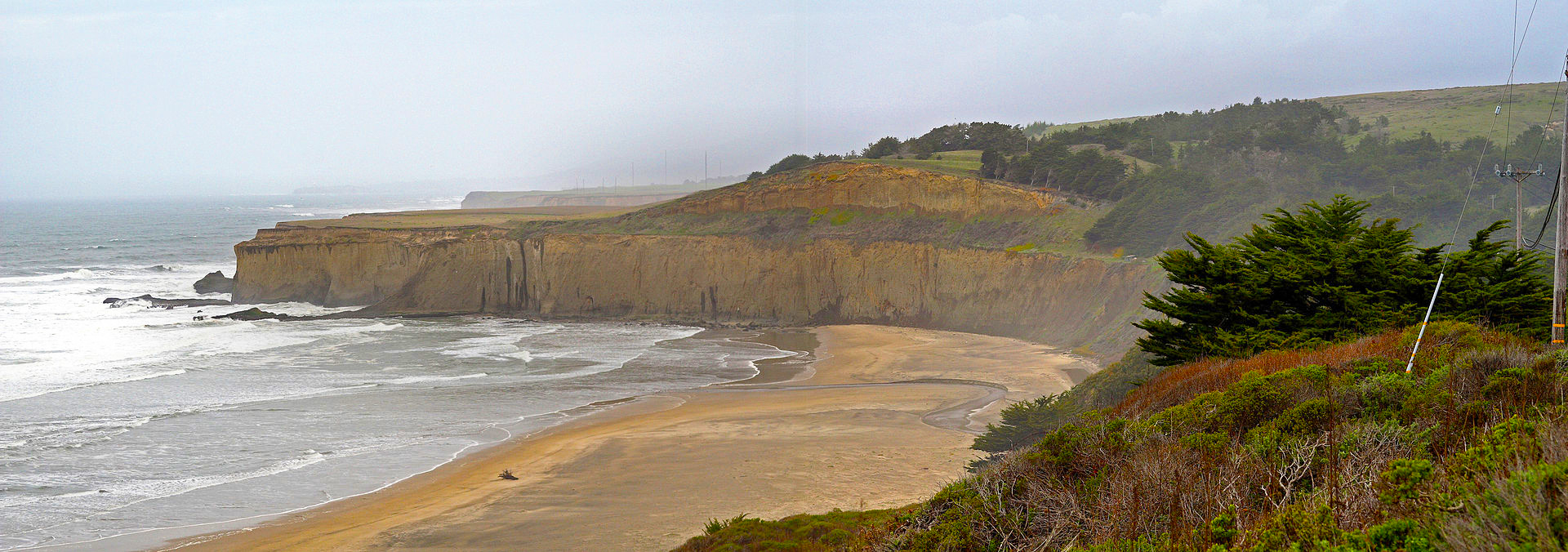
Scene from SR 1 near Half Moon Bay at Tunitas Creek Beach

Entering San Mateo County, SR 1 follows the west coast of the San Francisco Peninsula, passing by the marine mammal colonies at Año Nuevo State Park, and the historic Pigeon Point Lighthouse, before reaching Half Moon Bay. Between Half Moon Bay and Pacifica, the highway bypasses a treacherous stretch known as Devil's Slide via the Tom Lantos Tunnels.

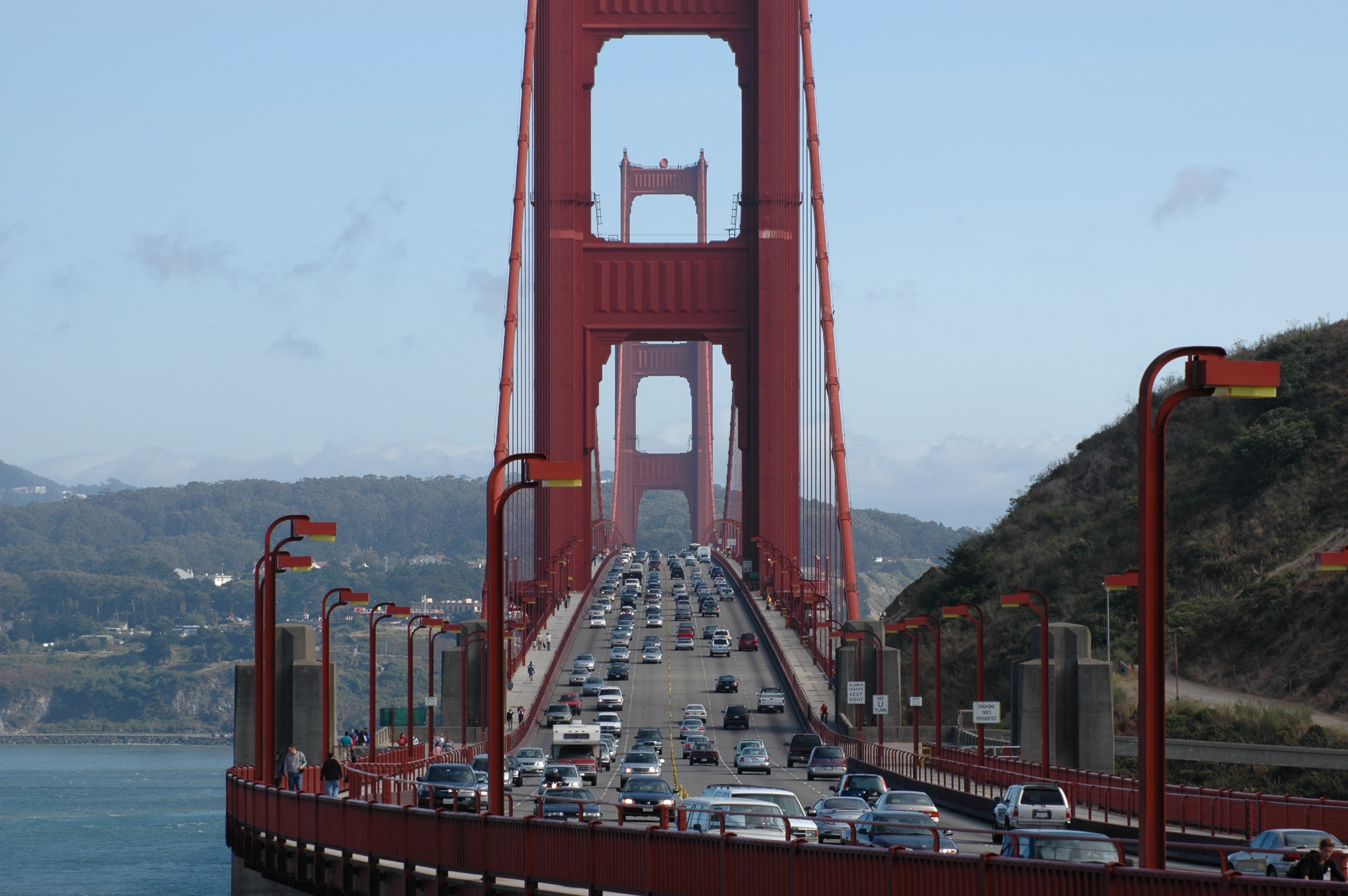
The Golden Gate Bridge, which SR 1 shares with US 101

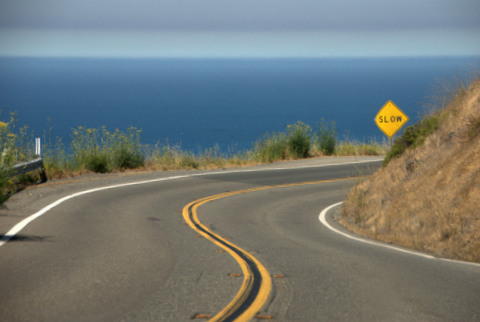
SR 1 winds along the Marin County coast

SR 1 then becomes a freeway once again at Sharp Park in Pacifica before turning inland to join Interstate 280 in Daly City. Just short of reaching the City and County of San Francisco, SR 1 splits from Interstate 280, where the road becomes Junipero Serra Boulevard. Shortly thereafter, the highway makes a slight left, becoming the six-lane wide 19th Avenue; the San Francisco Municipal Railway's M Ocean View streetcar line runs in the median from this point until a junction to a rail only right-of-way near Rossmoor Drive. SR 1 then turns into Park Presidio Boulevard after it passes through the city's Golden Gate Park. Then after entering the Presidio of San Francisco, it goes through the MacArthur Tunnel before joining US 101 for a fourth time on the approach to the Golden Gate Bridge known as Doyle Drive.

After crossing the bridge and entering Marin County, SR 1 then splits from US 101 again near Marin City, where it leaves the city and, as the Shoreline Highway, returns to a winding, two lane road as it passes over the Marin Hills to rejoin the coast at Muir Beach. After passing Stinson Beach and the Bolinas Lagoon, SR 1 avoids the immediate coastline of Point Reyes National Seashore and the rest of the Point Reyes Peninsula, and instead heads towards, and then along, the eastern shore of Tomales Bay.

Leaving Tomales Bay, SR 1 heads further inland to intersect with Valley Ford Road just north of the Sonoma County border. It then rejoins the coast in Bodega Bay, where its name changes to Coast Highway past the Sonoma Coast State Beaches. After bridging the Russian River at Jenner, SR 1 continues to wind along the rugged coast to Fort Ross, Salt Point State Parks, and the planned community of Sea Ranch.

=== Mendocino County ===
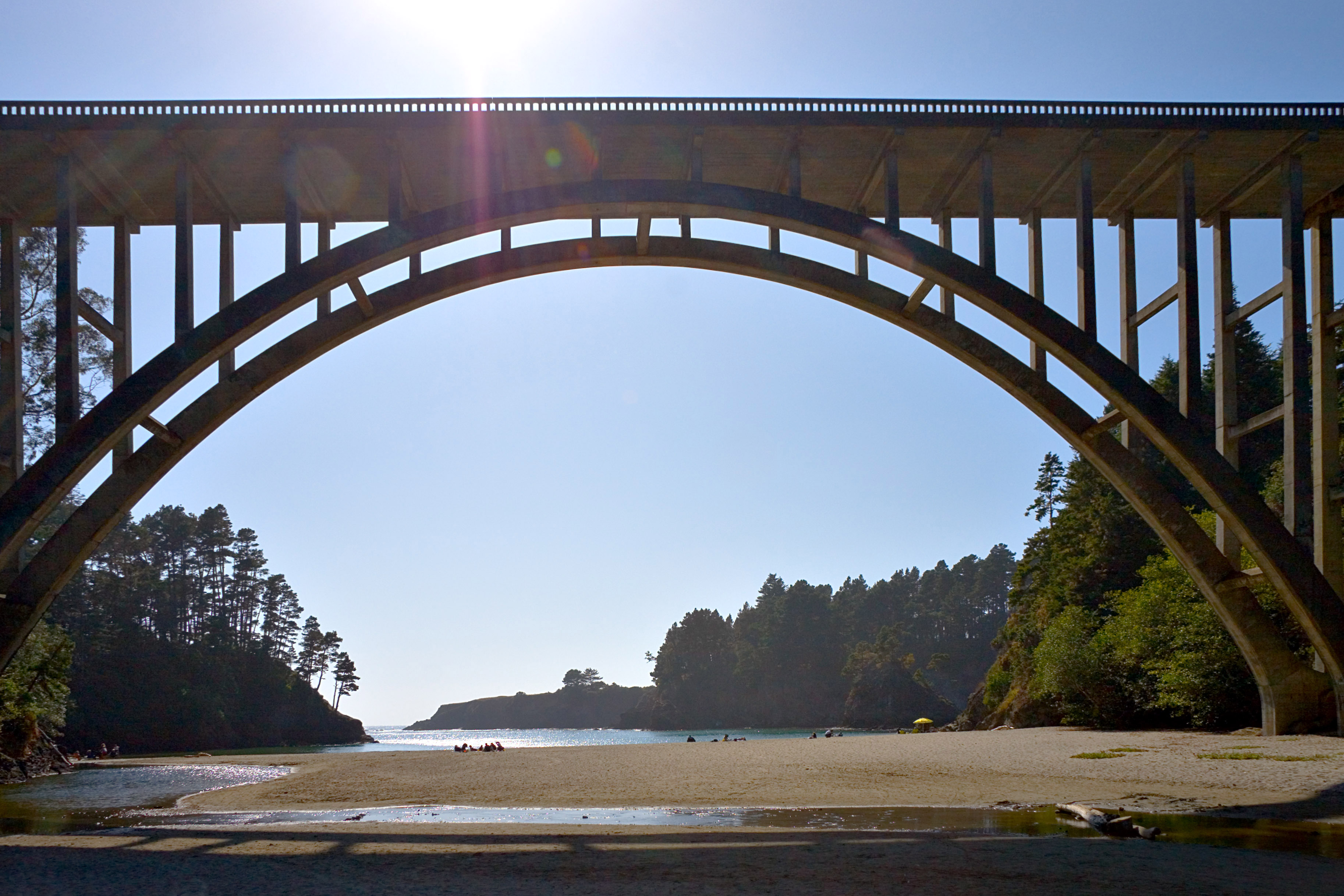
SR 1 crosses Russian Gulch State Park on the Frederick W. Panhorst Bridge

SR 1 then crosses the Gualala River and enters Mendocino County. The highway enters the city of Point Arena, in which it becomes Main Street, before following School Street to the northwest and then becoming Shoreline Highway once again. It bridges the Garcia River and then, near Elk, the Navarro River, where it meets SR 128.

At the town of Albion, the Albion River is spanned by the Albion River Bridge, the only remaining wooden trestle bridge on the highway. SR 1 then passes through Little River and Van Damme State Park, crosses Big River and passes through Mendocino Headlands State Park and the Victorian community of Mendocino. Continuing north, SR 1 crosses Russian Gulch State Park on the Frederick W. Panhorst Bridge, and passes through the town of Caspar. It passes through a roundabout just south of the intersection with the western terminus of SR 20, where it widens to two lanes, then bridges the Noyo River at Noyo, becomes Main Street of Fort Bragg, and crosses the California Western Railroad.

North of Fort Bragg as a two-lane highway again, SR 1 passes MacKerricher State Park and the towns of Cleone and Inglenook before crossing Ten Mile River. After passing Westport-Union Landing State Beach, the road goes through a series of redwood-forested switchbacks before reaching Rockport. North of Rockport, the highway turns away from the Lost Coast to avoid steep and unstable highlands created by Mendocino triple junction uplift. The highway follows Cottaneva Creek inland through redwood-forested mountainous terrain before terminating at US 101 just outside Leggett.

== History ==
SR 1 has become famous worldwide, but the highway was signed as several other routes prior to 1964. When the road was first envisioned in the World War I era, California highways were referred to by either a highway name or a route number. The route numbers were used by state highway planners and the Legislature from 1915 until 1964, but were never posted on highways, referred to by the auto clubs or public, nor used on maps. The SR 1 designation was first assigned in 1939. Various portions of SR 1 have been posted and referred to by various names and numbers over the years. State construction of what became SR 1 started after the state's third highway bond issue passed before 1910.

=== Segments initially constructed ===
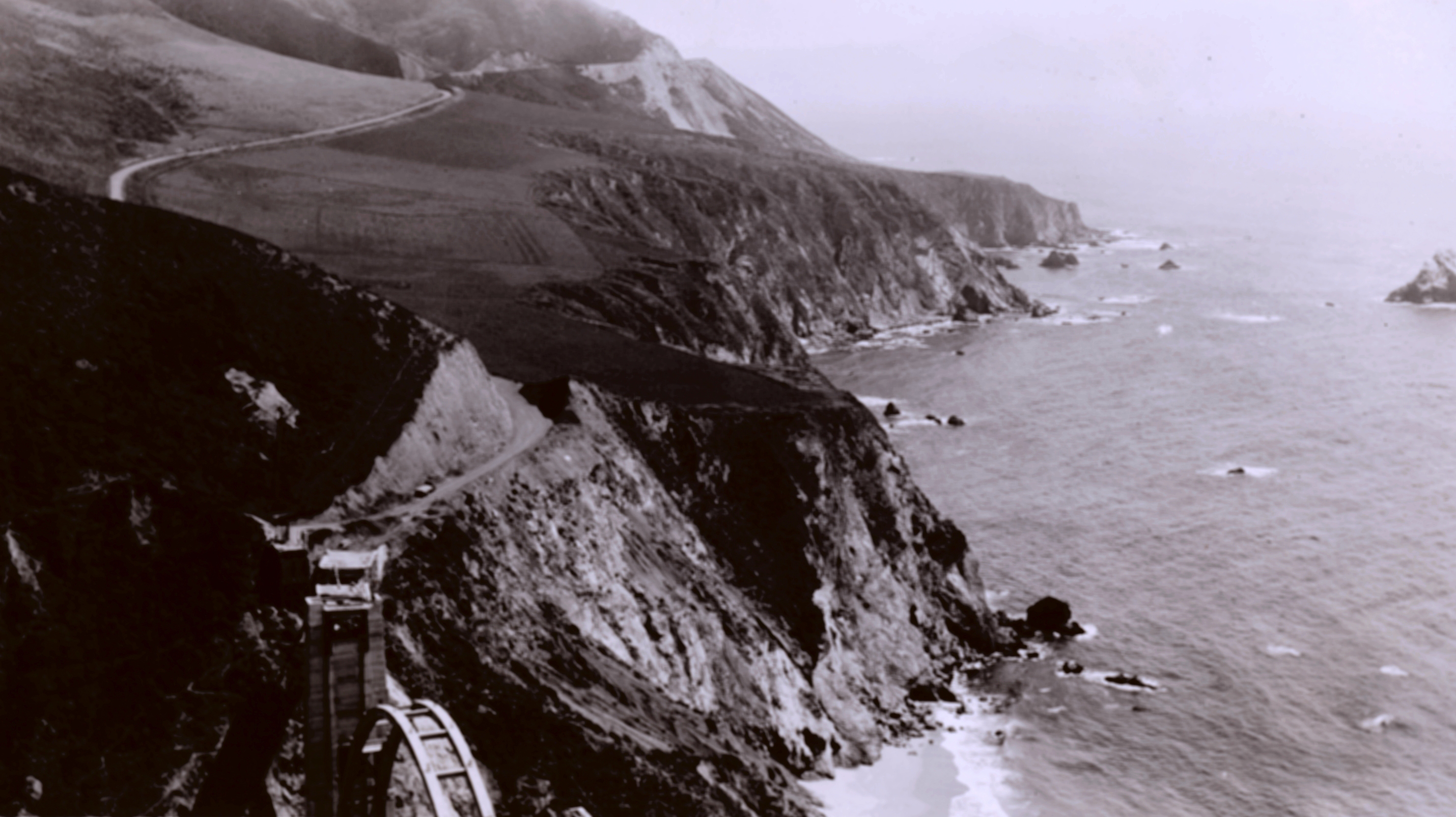
Bixby Bridge under construction in 1932

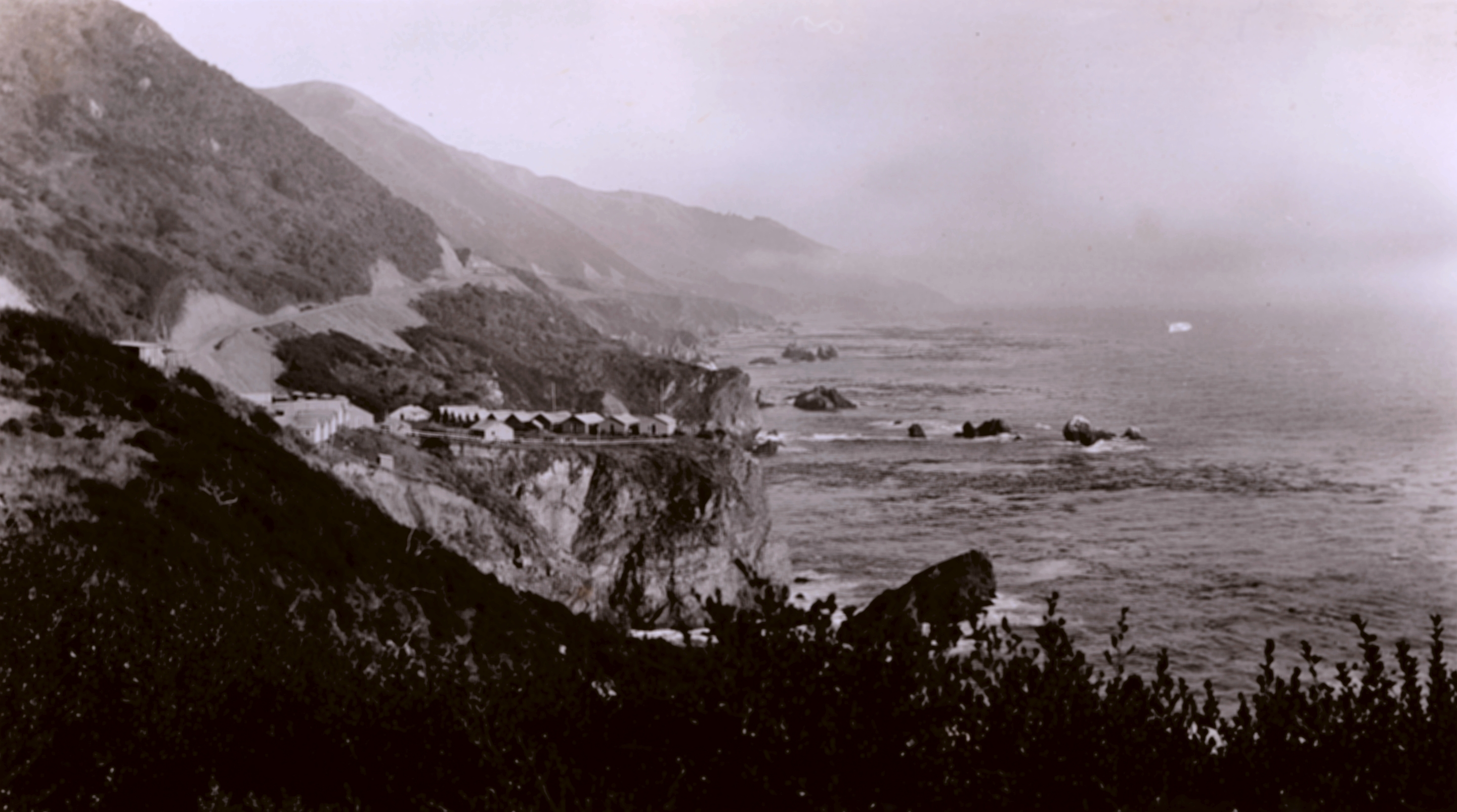
Convict labor from Folsom Prison was paid 35 cents per day to help build the roadway.

Eager for a direct coastal route between Ventura and Santa Barbara, civic boosters used locally raised funds to begin building the Rincon Sea Level Road in 1911. The route between the Ventura River and Carpinteria had been an unimproved route along small alluvial fan beaches that skirted coastal bluff rock outcroppings at low tide. Construction of the Southern Pacific Coast Line railroad had created a road flanked by riprap along this area. In order to make this part of the first coastal route for motorists driving from San Francisco to Los Angeles, they paved the road and built wooden causeways where the route flooded from the ocean waves. Local funding ran out, but the newly formed State Highway Commission took over and completed the road in 1913.

One of the most difficult routes to build was along the Big Sur coast. The state first approved building Route 56, or the Carmel-San Simeon Highway, to connect Big Sur to the rest of California in 1919. Federal funds were appropriated and in 1921 voters approved additional state funds. San Quentin State Prison set up three temporary prison camps to provide unskilled convict labor to help with road construction. One was set up by Little Sur River, one at Kirk Creek and a third was later established in the south at Anderson Creek. Inmates were paid 35 cents per day and had their prison sentences reduced in return. The route necessitated construction of 33 bridges, the largest of which was the Bixby Bridge. Six more concrete arch bridges were built between Point Sur and Carmel.

After 18 years of construction, aided by New Deal funds during the Great Depression, the paved two-lane road was completed and opened on June 17, 1937. The road was initially called the Carmel-San Simeon Highway (Route 56), but was better known as the Roosevelt Highway, honoring the current President Franklin D. Roosevelt. A 1921 law extended Route 56 south over the county road to Cambria.

Route 60, from Oxnard via the coast to San Juan Capistrano, was extended from Oxnard to El Rio (midway to Ventura, now the site of the Oxnard Boulevard interchange with US 101), in 1925. At Point Mugu, a path for the highway was cut through the mountains using surplus World War I explosives, thus creating Mugu Rock. The 1921 legislation, in theory, made Route 60 a continuous coastal loop, with both ends at what became US 101 in Oxnard and at Capistrano Beach (since 1964 the southern terminus of SR 1 at Interstate 5 in Orange County). Route 56 was extended further south from Cambria to connect to present-day US 101 in San Luis Obispo in 1931.

The route from San Simeon to Carmel (connecting with existing county highways at each end) was one of two sections designated as SR 1. It and Route 60 were intended as links in a continuous coastal roadway from Oregon to Mexico,

A large expansion of the state highway system in 1933 resulted in Route 56 being extended in both directions. To the south, a second section was added, beginning at Pismo Beach on US 101 (Route 2) and heading south through Guadalupe and Lompoc to rejoin US 101 at a junction called Los Cruces (sic), just north of Gaviota Pass. (A short piece near Orcutt and Los Alamos had been part of Route 2, which originally followed present SR 135 from Los Alamos to Santa Maria.) To the north, Route 56 was continued along the coast from Carmel through Santa Cruz to San Francisco. Several discontinuous pieces were added north of San Francisco, one from Route 1 (US 101) north of the Golden Gate to the county line near Valley Ford, another from the Russian River near Jenner (where the new Route 104 ended) to Westport, and a third from Ferndale to Route 1 near Fernbridge. Except for the gaps in Route 56 north of San Francisco, these additions completed the coastal highway, with other sections formed by Routes 1, 2, and 71.

The section of SR 1 from Santa Monica to Oxnard, via Malibu, went out to contract in 1925 as "Coast Boulevard", but was designated "Theodore Roosevelt Highway" when it was dedicated in 1929. Before the completion of its present alignment in 1937, a narrow, winding, steep road known as Pedro Mountain Road connected Montara with Pacifica. That highway was completed in 1914 and provided competition to the Ocean Shore Railroad, which operated between San Francisco and Tunitas Creek from 1907 to 1920. SR 1 also used to run along the coast between Pacifica and Daly City, but this segment was damaged and rendered unusable after a 5.3 magnitude earthquake on March 22, 1957. A small stub remains near Thornton Beach.

Route 56 along Big Sur was incorporated into the state highway system and re-designated as SR 1 in 1939. The section of road along the Big Sur Coast was declared the first State Scenic Highway in 1965, and in 1966 the first lady, Lady Bird Johnson, led the official designation ceremony at Bixby Bridge. The route was designated as an All American Road by the US Government.

=== Signs first posted ===
State Route 3
- Location: San Juan Capistrano–Oxnard
- Existed: 1934–1935

U.S. Route 101 Alternate
- Location: San Juan Capistrano–Oxnard
- Existed: 1936–1964

State Route 208
- Location: Rockport–Leggett
- Existed: 1964–1984

SR 1 signs first went up after California decided to number its highways, in 1934. The section for Humboldt, Mendocino, Sonoma, Marin, San Francisco, San Mateo, Santa Cruz, Monterey, San Luis Obispo and Santa Barbara counties was posted as SR 1, that section of the road known Route 56 (Las Cruces to Fernbridge). For Ventura, Los Angeles and Orange counties, Route 60 (San Juan Capistrano to the Oxnard area) became SR 3, and a few SR 3 signs were actually posted. The SR 3 signs were replaced by US 101 Alt. shields by 1936, as the road was built out; this change also allowed the extension of US 66 to end at another U.S. Route, in Santa Monica.

The gaps of non-state highway along the northern coast were finally filled in by the Legislature in 1951, though the State Department of Public Works was not required to maintain the newly added portions immediately. A connection from near Rockport to Legislative Route 1 (signed US 101) at Leggett was also added to the Legislative Route 56 definition, as the existing county road north from Rockport to Ferndale had not yet been paved.

A portion of the road heading to the Golden Gate Bridge was widened to four lanes as part of a project competed in 1954.

The state Legislature in 1963 tossed out the old conflicting Legislative Route Numbers (1964 renumbering), got rid of some famous old U.S. routes, and renumbered many state highways. It abolished US 101A in Los Angeles, Orange and Ventura counties and renumbered it as SR 1. The Rockport to Leggett connection then became State Route 208. The cover of California Highways magazine for in early 1964 shows state engineers posting the new shield at Point Mugu. The same year, the Legislature by state law named SR 1 "Pacific Coast Highway" in Orange, Los Angeles and Ventura counties, "Cabrillo Highway" from Santa Barbara north to San Francisco, and "Shoreline Highway" from Marin County to its northern terminus. Many cities, however, did not change the name of city streets that are part of SR 1, such as Lincoln and Sepulveda boulevards in Los Angeles, Santa Monica and El Segundo; and Junipero Serra and Park Presidio boulevards in San Francisco. Several other cities and communities like Newport Beach, Laguna Beach and Bodega Bay merely named their respective city streets as "Coast Highway".

=== Modern alignments ===
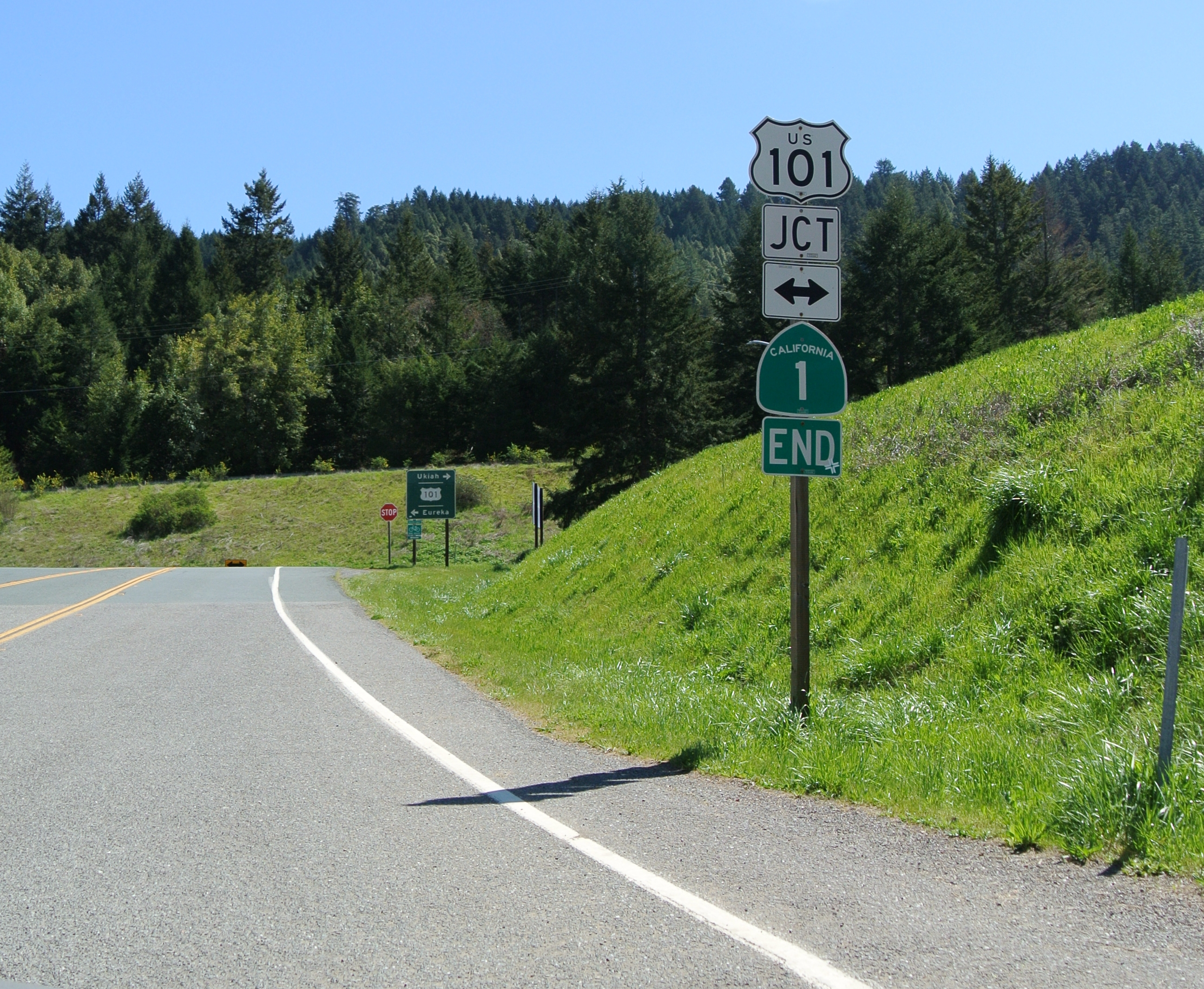
Signs marking the northern terminus of SR 1 near Leggett; the route was originally proposed to run further north, but these plans were abandoned to avoid the steep and unstable highlands of the Lost Coast region.

The freeway portion of SR 1 from Highway 68 in Monterey to Munras Avenue opened in 1956–1960. The segment from Munras Avenue to the northern border of Sand City and Seaside opened in 1968, and bypasses the original highway alignment of Munras Avenue and Fremont Street in Monterey, and Fremont Boulevard through Seaside. North of Seaside, the freeway was built over the original SR 1 alignment through Fort Ord in 1973. North of Fort Ord, SR 1 now veers to the left of the original alignment and bypasses Marina to the west. This segment including the interchange with SR 156 and the short, 2-lane Castroville Bypass opened in 1976. Originally SR 1 followed the SR 156 alignment to the SR 183 intersection in Castroville, then turned northwest, following the present-day SR 183 through Castroville before rejoining its existing alignment at the northern terminus of the Castroville Bypass.

Plans to upgrade SR 1 to a freeway from its southern terminus all the way to Oxnard, including building an offshore causeway from the Santa Monica Pier to Topanga Canyon Boulevard south of Malibu, were ultimately killed by 1971 due to local opposition. In 1980, another section was added northwest of Ventura near Emma Wood State Beach, when several miles of the old two-lane alignment of U.S. Route 101 were posted as SR 1 where the freeway had bypassed it in about 1960. Then in 1988, the segment from Purisima Road in Lompoc to SR 135 was re-routed from Harris Grade Road to the former County Route S20 so it could directly serve Vandenberg Air Force Base.

Construction to bridge the gap in the Lost Coast region between Rockport and Ferndale was eventually abandoned. The steepness and related geotechnical challenges of the coastal mountains made this stretch of coastline too costly for highway builders to establish routes through the area. In 1984, SR 1 was then re-routed to replace State Highway 208, connecting Rockport and Leggett, while the segment between Ferndale and Fernbridge was renumbered as State Highway 211. Most of the coastline in the area is now part of Sinkyone Wilderness State Park and the King Range National Conservation Area.

The roadway along Devil's Slide, south of Pacifica, became the site of frequent deadly crashes and roadway-closing landslides. Beginning in 1958, Caltrans supported a plan to construct an inland bypass over Montara Mountain as an alternate route, but was eventually opposed by community and environmental groups who supported a tunnel instead. After decades of legal disputes, the Federal Highway Administration ordered Caltrans in 1995 to re-evaluate the proposed tunnel. Then on November 5, 1996, San Mateo County voters approved Measure T to change the county's official preference from the bypass to the tunnel. Ground eventually broke in 2005, and the Tom Lantos Tunnels opened in April 2013.

In 2014, two-way traffic was restored along the original PCH segment from Copper Lantern to Blue Lantern streets in the Dana Point city center after 25 years of one-way operation. During that period, only northbound traffic had flowed along this section of PCH while southbound traffic had been diverted onto the parallel Del Prado Avenue.

SR 1 has never been planned to extend south into San Diego, or north into Crescent City, where I-5 (which replaced the US 101 designation and signage between Los Angeles and San Diego) and US 101 serve as the coastal highways in those areas, respectively.

=== As a cycling venue ===
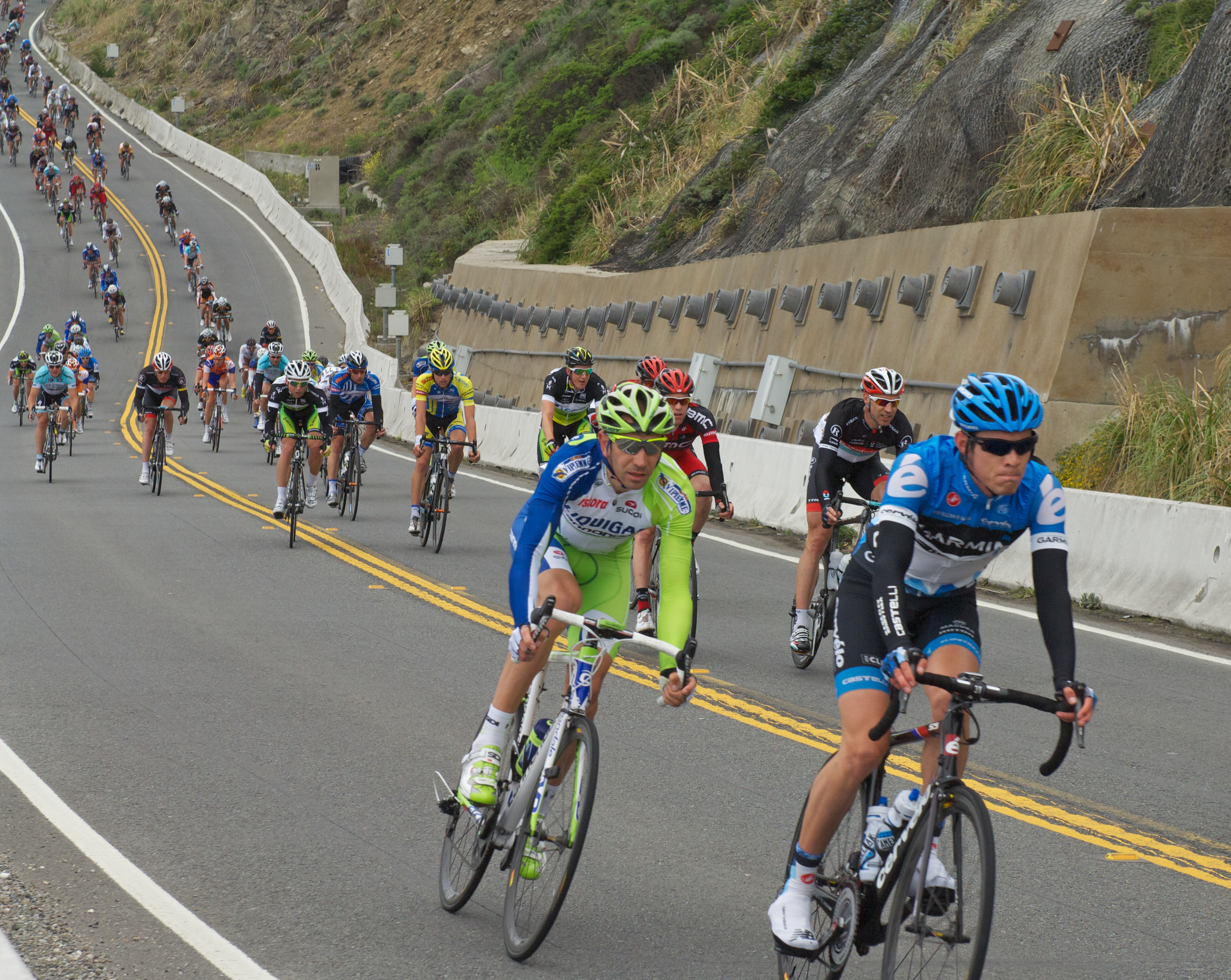
Cyclists descend SR 1 at Devil's Slide on Stage 2 of the 2012 Tour of California before the segment was bypassed one year later by the Tom Lantos Tunnels

For the 1932 Summer Olympics, the segment of the SR 1 between Oxnard and Santa Monica (then known as the Theodore Roosevelt Highway) hosted part of the road cycling events. Portions of SR 1 have also hosted stages of the Tour of California.

== Maintenance ==
California's coastline is constantly changing and continually presents us with challenges. Through hard work and determination, we continue to keep this scenic highway open.

— Malcolm Dougherty, director of Caltrans.

=== Landslides ===
Frequent landslides and erosion along the coast have caused portions of SR 1 to either be closed for long periods of time, or be re-routed entirely. Some of these include:

- A segment along the coast between Pacifica and Daly City in what is now Thornton Beach was damaged and rendered unusable after a 5.3 magnitude earthquake on March 22, 1957. SR 1 was then eventually re-routed to turn inland to join Interstate 280.
- The Piedras Blancas Realignment Project plans to re-route the road up to 475 feet (145 m) further inland to avoid the expected coastal erosion from the Piedras Blancas Light Station to the Arroyo de la Cruz Bridge in San Luis Obispo County.
- Big Rock Mesa landslide in September 1983 in Malibu was one of the worst in state history. A total of 250 homes collapsed, cracked or slid off their foundation with 30 homes being condemned. The state agreed to pay forty million dollars as cutting through the hillside to build Pacific Coast Highway was a contributing cause.
- The Devil's Slide area has been prone to major landslides. One slide in 1995 caused the road to be closed for five months, while another in 2006 led to a four-month closure. The Tom Lantos Tunnels, named after former U.S. Congressman Tom Lantos, opened in 2013 to bypass the area.
- In 2011, major reconstruction was completed between Muir Beach and Stinson Beach, including the addition of a 523-foot-long (159 m), 20-foot-high (6.1 m), but mostly buried, retaining wall. This followed a four-month, $25 million reconstruction that repaired damage from a 2007 landslide.
- A March 2011 landslide in the Big Sur region forced Caltrans to close the highway for several months. A section south of Lucia that is also prone to frequent landslides, known as Pitkins Curve and Rain Rocks, was replaced with a bridge and a covered rock shed.
- During the winter of 2016–2017, the Big Sur region received more than 60 inches (150 cm) of rain. The road was closed or partially closed due to mudslides and landslides in at least six locations. On February 20, Caltrans declared that the Pfeiffer Canyon Bridge just south of Pfeiffer Big Sur State Park was damaged beyond repair, closing that segment of SR 1 for eight months, and effectively splitting Big Sur in half. Some businesses, cut off from customers and without access to supplies, were forced to close. For some residents, the only means of getting out was via helicopter. In March, Caltrans demolished the bridge and began construction of the replacement. The rebuilt bridge opened on October 13, 2017, at a cost of $24 million.
- Another major slide at Mud Creek closed a 30-mile (48 km) stretch of the highway in May 2017. The huge slide at Mud Creek covered about one-third mile (0.54 km) of road with 40 feet (12 m) of dirt and rock. The slide was on a section of the road that was already closed due to smaller slides. The scale of the slide was compared to a very large slide during the winter of 1983–1984 that closed SR 1 for more than a year. A replacement roadway was built over the landslide and opened in July 2018, at a cost of $40 million.
- After heavy rainfall, a section of the highway at mile marker 30, near Rat Creek in Monterey County, collapsed into the ocean in January 2021. It reopened in April 2021.
- Multiple landslides during successive storm systems in January 2023 forced the closure of nearly 40 miles (64 km) of the highway. As of April 2023, over 25 miles (40 km) of the highway remained closed. A 7-mile (11 km) stretch of the highway near Lucia would remain closed until January 2026.
- Landslides in March 2024 forced the closure of a 1.4-mile (2.3 km) stretch north of the Rocky Creek Bridge in the Big Sur region.

=== Future projects ===
In 2014, Caltrans relinquished the portion of SR 1 in Oxnard along Oxnard Boulevard. The plan is then for PCH between Pleasant Valley Road and US 101 to be re-routed from Oxnard Boulevard onto Rice Avenue. That segment of Rice Avenue includes a railroad grade crossing at 5th Avenue that was the site of the February 2015 Oxnard train derailment, which eventually led to one death and 29 injuries. This was the twelfth accident at the crossing in ten years. An overpass has been planned at that site for almost two decades, but funding has not been available in Ventura County for the estimated $35 million grade separation project. On July 12, 2023, the Ventura County Transportation Commission and the City of Oxnard received $15 million in state funding to build an overpass. The project was estimated to be completed by the fall of 2027. As of February 2025, $134.5 million has been invested in the project. Construction started on March 19, and is estimated to be completed in December 2029.

In 2015, a $20 million project was proposed to add over 150 safety improvements to the stretch of the highway in Malibu. This follows a string of fatal accidents in the area, including one involving Caitlyn Jenner that claimed another person's life.

The Calera Parkway project proposes to widen the non-freeway segment in Pacifica between the Rockaway Beach and Vallemar districts, but is facing opposition by local residents and environmentalists.

== Major intersections ==
Except where prefixed with a letter, postmiles were measured on the road as it was in 1964, based on the alignment that existed at the time, and do not necessarily reflect current mileage. Postmile prefixes include: R reflecting a realignment in the route since then, M indicating a second realignment, L referring to an overlap due to a correction or change, and T indicating postmiles classified as temporary. Segments that remain unconstructed or have been relinquished to local control may be omitted. The numbers reset at county lines; the start and end postmiles in each county are given in the county column.

County	Location	Postmile	Exit	Destinations	Notes
Orange; ORA R0.13-33.71	Dana Point	R0.13		I-5 (San Diego Freeway) – Santa Ana, San Diego	Interchange; southern terminus; I-5 exit 79; road continues as Camino las Ramblas
Orange; ORA R0.13-33.71	Dana Point	R0.78	—	Coast Highway south, Doheny Park Road – Capistrano Beach	Interchange; former US 101
Orange; ORA R0.13-33.71	Dana Point		Northern end of freeway; northern end of state maintenance (Note: The state has relinquished, and turned over various segments of the highway to local control.)		
Orange; ORA R0.13-33.71	Dana Point–Laguna Beach line		Southern end of state maintenance		
Orange; ORA R0.13-33.71	Laguna Beach	9.42		SR 133 north (Broadway Street, Laguna Canyon Road)	
Orange; ORA R0.13-33.71	Newport Beach	13.47		Newport Coast Drive to SR 73 Toll	Northern end of state maintenance
Orange; ORA R0.13-33.71	Newport Beach	16.25		MacArthur Boulevard	Former SR 73 north; serves John Wayne Airport
Orange; ORA R0.13-33.71	Newport Beach	17.43		Jamboree Road – Balboa Island	Southern end of state maintenance
Orange; ORA R0.13-33.71	Newport Beach	19.80		SR 55 north (Newport Boulevard) – Costa Mesa, Balboa Peninsula	Interchange; SR 55 exit 1
Orange; ORA R0.13-33.71	Huntington Beach	22.09		Brookhurst Street – Fountain Valley	
Orange; ORA R0.13-33.71	Huntington Beach	23.74		SR 39 north (Beach Boulevard)	Southern terminus of SR 39
Los Angeles; LA 0.00-62.69	Long Beach	1.97		SR 22 east (7th Street)	Western terminus of SR 22
Los Angeles; LA 0.00-62.69	Long Beach	3.56		SR 19 north (Lakewood Boulevard) / Los Coyotes Diagonal – Downey, Bellflower	Los Alamitos Circle; southern terminus of SR 19; serves Long Beach Airport
Los Angeles; LA 0.00-62.69	Long Beach	7.29		I-710 (Long Beach Freeway) – Long Beach, Pasadena	Interchange; I-710 exit 2
Los Angeles; LA 0.00-62.69	Long Beach	8.27		SR 103 (Terminal Island Freeway) / Willow Street – Terminal Island	Interchange
Los Angeles; LA 0.00-62.69	Los Angeles	8.43		2200-2400 East Pacific Coast Highway – Port of Los Angeles	Interchange
Los Angeles; LA 0.00-62.69	Los Angeles	9.25		O Street to Alameda Street (SR 47)	Interchange
Los Angeles; LA 0.00-62.69	Los Angeles	11.61		I-110 (Harbor Freeway) – Los Angeles, San Pedro	Interchange; I-110 exit 4
Los Angeles; LA 0.00-62.69	Los Angeles	13.10		SR 213 (Western Avenue)	
Los Angeles; LA 0.00-62.69	Torrance	16.01		SR 107 north / CR N7 south (Hawthorne Boulevard) – Inglewood, Palos Verdes Estates	
Los Angeles; LA 0.00-62.69	Hermosa Beach–Manhattan Beach line	21.92		Artesia Boulevard to SR 91 east	Former western end of SR 91
Los Angeles; LA 0.00-62.69	Los Angeles	25.92		I-105 east (Century Freeway) / Imperial Highway – Norwalk	Interchange; I-105 exit 1
Los Angeles; LA 0.00-62.69	Los Angeles	26.18	Airport Tunnel		
Los Angeles; LA 0.00-62.69	Los Angeles	26.90		Century Boulevard – LAX Airport	Interchange
Los Angeles; LA 0.00-62.69	Los Angeles	27.40		LAX Airport (96th Street)	Interchange
Los Angeles; LA 0.00-62.69	Los Angeles	27.36		Sepulveda Boulevard	No southbound left turn
Los Angeles; LA 0.00-62.69	Los Angeles	28.50		Westchester Parkway	Interchange
Los Angeles; LA 0.00-62.69	Los Angeles	29.08		Manchester Avenue	Former western end of SR 42
Los Angeles; LA 0.00-62.69	Los Angeles–Marina del Rey line			Culver Boulevard	Interchange
Los Angeles; LA 0.00-62.69	Los Angeles	31.29		SR 90 east (Marina Freeway)	
Los Angeles; LA 0.00-62.69	Los Angeles	32.17		Venice Boulevard (SR 187 east) – Culver City, Venice	
Los Angeles; LA 0.00-62.69	Los Angeles–Santa Monica line		Northern end of state maintenance		
Los Angeles; LA 0.00-62.69	Santa Monica	R34.53	Southern end of state maintenance		
Los Angeles; LA 0.00-62.69	Santa Monica	R34.58		I-10 east (Santa Monica Freeway) / Olympic Boulevard – Los Angeles	Eastern end of I-10 concurrency; interchange; former western terminus of SR 2; I-10 east exit 1A, west exit 1B
Los Angeles; LA 0.00-62.69	Santa Monica	R34.58	Southern end of freeway on I-10		
Los Angeles; LA 0.00-62.69	Santa Monica		Western end of I-10 concurrency; western terminus of I-10		
Los Angeles; LA 0.00-62.69	Santa Monica	35.17	McClure Tunnel		
Los Angeles; LA 0.00-62.69	Santa Monica	35.17	Northern end of freeway		
Los Angeles; LA 0.00-62.69	Santa Monica	35.18		Ocean Avenue – Downtown Santa Monica	Interchange; southbound exit and northbound entrance; former SR 187 east
Los Angeles; LA 0.00-62.69	Topanga	40.77		SR 27 north (Topanga Canyon Boulevard)	
Los Angeles; LA 0.00-62.69	Malibu	48.17		CR N1 north (Malibu Canyon Road)	
Los Angeles; LA 0.00-62.69	Malibu	54.02		CR N9 north (Kanan Dume Road)	
Los Angeles; LA 0.00-62.69	Malibu	59.90		SR 23 north (Decker Canyon Road) – Thousand Oaks	
Los Angeles; LA 0.00-62.69		62.30		Mulholland Highway	
Ventura; VEN 0.00-28.48			Southern end of freeway		
Ventura; VEN 0.00-28.48		10.23	107	Las Posas Road – USN Point Mugu	
Ventura; VEN 0.00-28.48		11.59	108	Wood Road – USN Point Mugu	
Ventura; VEN 0.00-28.48		12.79	109	Hueneme Road	
Ventura; VEN 0.00-28.48	Oxnard	13.59	110	Nauman Road	No entrance ramps to SR 1; no access across SR 1
Ventura; VEN 0.00-28.48	Oxnard	R14.67		Rice Avenue south	Southbound exit and northbound entrance
Ventura; VEN 0.00-28.48	Oxnard	15.06	112	Pleasant Valley Road, Oxnard Boulevard	Northern end of state maintenance; Oxnard Boulevard is former SR 1 north
Ventura; VEN 0.00-28.48	Oxnard		Northern end of freeway		
Ventura; VEN 0.00-28.48	Oxnard			Fifth Street (SR 34 east)	
Ventura; VEN 0.00-28.48	Oxnard	22.08 (Note: Indicates that the postmile represents the distance along US 101 rather than SR 1.)		US 101 south (Ventura Freeway) / Santa Clara Avenue – Los Angeles	Southern end of US 101 concurrency; interchange; southern end of state maintenance; US 101 exit 60
Ventura; VEN 0.00-28.48	Oxnard	22.08	Southern end of freeway on US 101		
Ventura; VEN 0.00-28.48	Oxnard	21.01	61 (Note: Exit numbers follow US 101 rather than SR 1.)	Rose Avenue	
Ventura; VEN 0.00-28.48	Oxnard	22.01	62A	SR 232 north (Vineyard Avenue) – Oxnard	
Ventura; VEN 0.00-28.48	Oxnard	22.73	62B	Oxnard Boulevard	Former SR 1 south
Ventura; VEN 0.00-28.48	Oxnard		63A	Ventura Road	Southbound exit only
Ventura; VEN 0.00-28.48	Ventura	R23.45	63B	Johnson Drive	Signed as exit 63 northbound
Ventura; VEN 0.00-28.48	Ventura	R24.65	64	Victoria Avenue – Channel Islands Harbor	
Ventura; VEN 0.00-28.48	Ventura	25.97	65	Telephone Road	Northbound entrance is via Main Street
Ventura; VEN 0.00-28.48	Ventura	26.39	66A	SR 126 east (Santa Paula Freeway) – Santa Clarita	Signed as exit 66 southbound; southbound entrance is via exit 1C from SR 126 west; SR 126 west exit 1A
Ventura; VEN 0.00-28.48	Ventura	26.72	66B	Main Street (US 101 Bus. north)	No southbound exit
Ventura; VEN 0.00-28.48	Ventura	28.45	68	Seaward Avenue	
Ventura; VEN 0.00-28.48	Ventura	29.45	69	Vista del Mar Drive, Sanjon Road	Northbound exit and southbound entrance
Ventura; VEN 0.00-28.48	Ventura	30.15	70A	California Street, Ventura Avenue	
Ventura; VEN 0.00-28.48	Ventura	30.91	70B	SR 33 north (Ojai Freeway) – Ojai	
Ventura; VEN 0.00-28.48	Ventura	31.50	71	Main Street (US 101 Bus. south)	Southbound exit and northbound entrance
Ventura; VEN 0.00-28.48	Solimar Beach	R32.70 21.25	Northern end of freeway on US 101		
Ventura; VEN 0.00-28.48	Solimar Beach	R32.70 21.25		US 101 north (Ventura Freeway)	Northern end of US 101 concurrency; interchange; northbound exit and southbound entrance; US 101 exit 72
Ventura; VEN 0.00-28.48	Sea Cliff	27.68 R38.98		US 101 south (Ventura Freeway) – Los Angeles	Southern end of US 101 concurrency; interchange; US 101 exit 78
Ventura; VEN 0.00-28.48	Sea Cliff	27.68 R38.98	Southern end of freeway on US 101		
Ventura; VEN 0.00-28.48		R39.80	79	Mussel Shoals (Old Pacific Coast Highway)	Southbound exit and entrance
Ventura; VEN 0.00-28.48		41.00	81	La Conchita (West Surfside Street)	Northbound exit and entrance
Ventura; VEN 0.00-28.48		R43.57	83	Bates Road	
Santa Barbara; SB R0.00-50.60	Carpinteria	R0.63	84	SR 150 east – Ojai, Lake Casitas	
Santa Barbara; SB R0.00-50.60	Carpinteria	1.61	85	Bailard Avenue	
Santa Barbara; SB R0.00-50.60	Carpinteria	2.64	86A	Casitas Pass Road	Signed as exit 86 northbound; former SR 224
Santa Barbara; SB R0.00-50.60	Carpinteria	3.06	86B	Linden Avenue	Southbound exit and northbound entrance
Santa Barbara; SB R0.00-50.60	Carpinteria	3.77	87A	Reynolds Avenue, Santa Monica Road	Signed as exit 87 northbound
Santa Barbara; SB R0.00-50.60	Carpinteria	4.34	87B	Carpinteria Avenue	Southbound exit only
Santa Barbara; SB R0.00-50.60	Toro Canyon	R5.28	88	Padaro Lane, Santa Claus Lane	
Santa Barbara; SB R0.00-50.60	Summerland	R7.14	90	Padaro Lane – Summerland	
Santa Barbara; SB R0.00-50.60	Summerland	R8.26	91	Evans Avenue – Summerland	
Santa Barbara; SB R0.00-50.60	Montecito	9.00	92	Sheffield Drive	
Santa Barbara; SB R0.00-50.60	Montecito	10.02	93	San Ysidro Road	
Santa Barbara; SB R0.00-50.60	Montecito	10.54	94A	Olive Mill Road, Coast Village Road	No northbound entrance
Santa Barbara; SB R0.00-50.60	Santa Barbara	11.10	94B	Hermosillo Drive	Northbound exit only
Santa Barbara; SB R0.00-50.60	Santa Barbara	11.41	94C	Cabrillo Boulevard, Coast Village Road	No southbound entrance; signed as exit 94B southbound
Santa Barbara; SB R0.00-50.60	Santa Barbara		95	Los Patos Way (unsigned)	Southbound exit only
Santa Barbara; SB R0.00-50.60	Santa Barbara	12.10	95	Salinas Street	Northbound exit and entrance
Santa Barbara; SB R0.00-50.60	Santa Barbara	12.75	96	Milpas Street	Former SR 144; northbound exit signed as exit 96A; southbound as exits 96B and 96A
Santa Barbara; SB R0.00-50.60	Santa Barbara	13.49	96	Laguna Street, Garden Street – Downtown Santa Barbara	Laguna Street/Garden Street northbound exit signed as exit 96B; Garden Street southbound exit signed as exit 96C
Santa Barbara; SB R0.00-50.60	Santa Barbara	R14.19	97	Bath Street, Castillo Street; Santa Barbara Harbor	
Santa Barbara; SB R0.00-50.60	Santa Barbara	R14.76	98A	Carrillo Street – Downtown Santa Barbara	Signed as exit 98 southbound
Santa Barbara; SB R0.00-50.60	Santa Barbara	15.26	98B	Arrellaga Street	Northbound exit and entrance
Santa Barbara; SB R0.00-50.60	Santa Barbara	R15.73	99A	Mission Street	Signed as exit 99 southbound
Santa Barbara; SB R0.00-50.60	Santa Barbara	16.05	99B	Pueblo Street	Northbound exit only
Santa Barbara; SB R0.00-50.60	Santa Barbara	16.55	100	Las Positas Road	Former SR 225
Santa Barbara; SB R0.00-50.60	Santa Barbara	17.78	101A	La Cumbre Road, Hope Avenue	
Santa Barbara; SB R0.00-50.60	Santa Barbara	18.38	101B	SR 154 west / State Street – Cachuma Lake	
Santa Barbara; SB R0.00-50.60	Eastern Goleta Valley	18.92	102	El Sueno Road	Northbound exit and entrance
Santa Barbara; SB R0.00-50.60	Eastern Goleta Valley	20.06	103	Turnpike Road	
Santa Barbara; SB R0.00-50.60	Goleta	21.15	104A	Patterson Avenue	Signed as exit 104 southbound
Santa Barbara; SB R0.00-50.60	Goleta	21.41	104B	SR 217 west – Airport, UCSB	Northbound exit and southbound entrance
Santa Barbara; SB R0.00-50.60	Goleta	22.53	105	Fairview Avenue	
Santa Barbara; SB R0.00-50.60	Goleta	23.72	107	Los Carneros Road	
Santa Barbara; SB R0.00-50.60	Goleta	24.77	108	Glen Annie Road, Storke Road	
Santa Barbara; SB R0.00-50.60	Goleta	26.91	110	Winchester Canyon Road, Hollister Avenue	All ramps are via Cathedral Oaks Road
Santa Barbara; SB R0.00-50.60			Northern end of freeway on US 101		
Santa Barbara; SB R0.00-50.60			Southern end of freeway on US 101		
Santa Barbara; SB R0.00-50.60		30.06	113	Dos Pueblos Canyon Road	
Santa Barbara; SB R0.00-50.60			Northern end of freeway on US 101		
Santa Barbara; SB R0.00-50.60			Southern end of freeway on US 101		
Santa Barbara; SB R0.00-50.60		32.84	116	El Capitan Ranch Road	
Santa Barbara; SB R0.00-50.60		33.85	117	El Capitan State Beach	
Santa Barbara; SB R0.00-50.60		36.62	120	Refugio Road – Refugio State Beach	
Santa Barbara; SB R0.00-50.60			Northern end of freeway on US 101		
Santa Barbara; SB R0.00-50.60		44.82	128	Mariposa Reina	Interchange
Santa Barbara; SB R0.00-50.60				Gaviota State Beach (Gaviota Beach Road)	At-grade intersection
Santa Barbara; SB R0.00-50.60	Gaviota Pass	46.30– 46.90	Gaviota Rest Area		
Santa Barbara; SB R0.00-50.60	Gaviota Pass	47.19	Gaviota Gorge Tunnel (northbound only)		
Santa Barbara; SB R0.00-50.60			Southern end of freeway on US 101		
Santa Barbara; SB R0.00-50.60	Las Cruces	R48.85 R0.00	Northern end of freeway on US 101		
Santa Barbara; SB R0.00-50.60	Las Cruces	R48.85 R0.00		US 101 north – San Luis Obispo, San Francisco	Northern end of US 101 concurrency; interchange; US 101 exit 132
Santa Barbara; SB R0.00-50.60	Lompoc	19.25		SR 246 east / 12th Street – Buellton	Southern end of SR 246 concurrency
Santa Barbara; SB R0.00-50.60	Lompoc	20.57		SR 246 west (Ocean Avenue) / H Street – NASA/Vandenberg SFB South Gate, Surf	Northern end of SR 246 concurrency
Santa Barbara; SB R0.00-50.60	Lompoc	23.30		Harris Grade Road, Purisima Road – Buellton	
Santa Barbara; SB R0.00-50.60	Vandenberg Village	R25.07	211	Constellation Road	Interchange
Santa Barbara; SB R0.00-50.60	Vandenberg SFB	M29.89		California Boulevard, Lompoc Casmalia Road – Vandenberg SFB	
Santa Barbara; SB R0.00-50.60	Vandenberg SFB			San Antonio Road West – Casmalia	
Santa Barbara; SB R0.00-50.60	Vandenberg SFB	M33.30		San Antonio Road East – Los Alamos	
Santa Barbara; SB R0.00-50.60	Vandenberg SFB	M36.19 R31.04	Southern end of freeway		
Santa Barbara; SB R0.00-50.60	Vandenberg SFB	M36.19 R31.04		SR 135 south – Los Alamos	Southern end of SR 135 concurrency; interchange; southbound left exit and northbound entrance
Santa Barbara; SB R0.00-50.60	Orcutt	R34.78	226	SR 135 north – Orcutt, Santa Maria	Northern end of SR 135 concurrency; northbound exit and southbound entrance
Santa Barbara; SB R0.00-50.60	Orcutt		Northern end of freeway		
Santa Barbara; SB R0.00-50.60	Orcutt	R35.53		Clark Avenue to SR 135 – Orcutt	
Santa Barbara; SB R0.00-50.60	Guadalupe	49.20		SR 166 east (Main Street) – Santa Maria	
San Luis Obispo; SLO 0.00-74.32				Valley Road – Arroyo Grande	
San Luis Obispo; SLO 0.00-74.32	Pismo Beach			Price Street (US 101 Bus. south) to US 101 south	Southern end of US 101 Bus. concurrency
San Luis Obispo; SLO 0.00-74.32	Pismo Beach	L16.54 17.75		US 101 south	Northern end of US 101 Bus. concurrency; southern end of US 101 concurrency; interchange; no northbound exit; SR 1 south follows exit 191A
San Luis Obispo; SLO 0.00-74.32	Pismo Beach	L16.54 17.75	Southern end of freeway on US 101		
San Luis Obispo; SLO 0.00-74.32	Pismo Beach	R19.81	193	Spyglass Drive	Northbound signage
San Luis Obispo; SLO 0.00-74.32	Pismo Beach	R19.81	193	Shell Beach Road	Southbound signage
San Luis Obispo; SLO 0.00-74.32	Avila Beach	R21.11	195	Avilla Beach Drive	
San Luis Obispo; SLO 0.00-74.32	Avila Beach	R22.29	196	San Luis Bay Drive – See Canyon, Avila Beach	
San Luis Obispo; SLO 0.00-74.32		R24.30	198	Higuera Street	
San Luis Obispo; SLO 0.00-74.32	San Luis Obispo	25.91	200A	Los Osos Valley Road	Signed as exit 200 southbound
San Luis Obispo; SLO 0.00-74.32	San Luis Obispo	26.83	200B	Prado Road, Elks Lane	Northbound exit and entrance
San Luis Obispo; SLO 0.00-74.32	San Luis Obispo	27.50	201	SR 227 south (Madonna Road)	
San Luis Obispo; SLO 0.00-74.32	San Luis Obispo	28.07	202A	Marsh Street	
San Luis Obispo; SLO 0.00-74.32	San Luis Obispo	28.81	202B	Broad Street	
San Luis Obispo; SLO 0.00-74.32	San Luis Obispo	29.08	203A	Osos Street, Santa Rosa Street	
San Luis Obispo; SLO 0.00-74.32	San Luis Obispo	29.08 16.77	Northern end of freeway on US 101		
San Luis Obispo; SLO 0.00-74.32	San Luis Obispo	29.08 16.77		US 101 / Santa Rosa Street	Northern end of US 101 concurrency; interchange; US 101 exit 203B
San Luis Obispo; SLO 0.00-74.32			Southern end of freeway		
San Luis Obispo; SLO 0.00-74.32	Morro Bay	27.88	277	Los Osos/Baywood Park (South Bay Boulevard)	
San Luis Obispo; SLO 0.00-74.32	Morro Bay	28.82	278	Morro Bay Boulevard	
San Luis Obispo; SLO 0.00-74.32	Morro Bay	29.62	279A	Main Street	
San Luis Obispo; SLO 0.00-74.32	Morro Bay	30.14	279B	SR 41 north – Atascadero	
San Luis Obispo; SLO 0.00-74.32			Northern end of freeway		
San Luis Obispo; SLO 0.00-74.32	Cayucos		Southern end of freeway		
San Luis Obispo; SLO 0.00-74.32	Cayucos	R34.91	284	Cayucos (SR 1 Bus. north)	Northbound exit and southbound entrance
San Luis Obispo; SLO 0.00-74.32	Cayucos	R35.96	285	Cayucos Drive	
San Luis Obispo; SLO 0.00-74.32	Cayucos		Northern end of freeway		
San Luis Obispo; SLO 0.00-74.32	Cayucos			North Ocean Avenue (SR 1 Bus. south) – Cayucos	
San Luis Obispo; SLO 0.00-74.32		45.99		SR 46 east (Green Valley Road) – Paso Robles	
San Luis Obispo; SLO 0.00-74.32	Cambria	48.26		SR 1 Bus. north (Main Street) / Ardath Drive – Cambria	
San Luis Obispo; SLO 0.00-74.32	Cambria			SR 1 Bus. south (Windsor Boulevard) / Moonstone Beach Drive – Cambria	
San Luis Obispo; SLO 0.00-74.32	San Simeon	56.39		Hearst Castle	
San Luis Obispo; SLO 0.00-74.32		71.34		San Carpóforo Creek Bridge	Marks southern end of the Big Sur coastline
Monterey; MON 0.00-R102.03		18.91		Nacimiento-Fergusson Road	Intersects at the southern end of Kirk Creek Bridge
Monterey; MON 0.00-R102.03		28.09	Big Creek Bridge		
Monterey; MON 0.00-R102.03		45.52		Pfeiffer Canyon Bridge	Demolished in March 2017 because of irreparable damage suffered during February 2017 landslides, effectively splitting Big Sur in half. The replacement bridge reopened in October 2017.
Monterey; MON 0.00-R102.03		59.37	Bixby Bridge		
Monterey; MON 0.00-R102.03		60.05	Rocky Creek Bridge		
Monterey; MON 0.00-R102.03		72.28		Carmel River Bridge	Marks northern end of the Big Sur coastline
Monterey; MON 0.00-R102.03		72.92		CR G16 east (Carmel Valley Road)	
Monterey; MON 0.00-R102.03			Southern end of freeway		
Monterey; MON 0.00-R102.03	Monterey	75.14	399A	SR 68 west – Pacific Grove, Pebble Beach	Southern end of SR 68 concurrency
Monterey; MON 0.00-R102.03	Monterey	R75.75	399B	Munras Avenue (SR 1 Bus. north) – Monterey	No northbound entrance
Monterey; MON 0.00-R102.03	Monterey	R76.00	399C	Soledad Drive, Munras Avenue	Southbound exit and northbound entrance
Monterey; MON 0.00-R102.03	Monterey	R77.38	401A	Aguajito Road (SR 1 Bus. south) – Monterey	
Monterey; MON 0.00-R102.03	Monterey	R78.12	401B	SR 68 east – Salinas	Northern end of SR 68 concurrency; SR 68 west exit 7B
Monterey; MON 0.00-R102.03	Monterey	R78.18	401B	North Fremont Street (SR 1 Bus. north)	Northbound exit and southbound entrance
Monterey; MON 0.00-R102.03	Monterey	R78.45	402A	Casa Verde Way	
Monterey; MON 0.00-R102.03	Monterey	R78.88	402B	Del Monte Avenue – Pacific Grove	
Monterey; MON 0.00-R102.03	Monterey	R79.36	403	SR 218 east (Canyon del Rey Boulevard) – Seaside, Del Rey Oaks	
Monterey; MON 0.00-R102.03	Sand City	R80.27	404	Fremont Boulevard (SR 1 Bus. south) / Del Monte Boulevard	
Monterey; MON 0.00-R102.03	Seaside	R82.89	406	Lightfighter Drive	
Monterey; MON 0.00-R102.03	Marina	R84.48	408	Imjin Parkway	
Monterey; MON 0.00-R102.03	Marina	R85.14	409	Del Monte Boulevard (SR 1 Bus. north)	Northbound exit and southbound entrance
Monterey; MON 0.00-R102.03	Marina	R86.48	410	Reservation Road (CR G17)	
Monterey; MON 0.00-R102.03		R88.64	412	Del Monte Boulevard (SR 1 Bus. south) – Marina	
Monterey; MON 0.00-R102.03		R90.39	414A	Nashua Road, Molera Road	Signed as exit 414 southbound
Monterey; MON 0.00-R102.03	Castroville	R90.98	414B	SR 156 east to US 101 – Castroville, San Jose	Northbound exit and southbound left entrance
Monterey; MON 0.00-R102.03	Castroville		Northern end of freeway		
Monterey; MON 0.00-R102.03	Castroville	T92.21		SR 183 south (Merritt Street) to SR 156 east – Castroville, Salinas	
Monterey; MON 0.00-R102.03	Moss Landing	96.10		Dolan Road – Elkhorn Slough Reserve	
Monterey; MON 0.00-R102.03			Southern end of freeway		
Monterey; MON 0.00-R102.03		R101.04	423	Salinas Road	Interchange; former at-grade intersection
Santa Cruz; SCR R0.00-37.45		R0.72	425	SR 129 east (Riverside Drive) to SR 152 east – Watsonville	
Santa Cruz; SCR R0.00-37.45	Watsonville	R2.27	426	Harkins Slough Road, Green Valley Road	Northbound exit and southbound entrance
Santa Cruz; SCR R0.00-37.45	Watsonville	R2.68	426	SR 152 east (Main Street)	Southbound exit and northbound entrance
Santa Cruz; SCR R0.00-37.45	Watsonville	R3.18	427	Airport Boulevard	Serves Watsonville Municipal Airport
Santa Cruz; SCR R0.00-37.45	Aptos Hills-Larkin Valley	R4.07	428	Buena Vista Drive	
Santa Cruz; SCR R0.00-37.45	Aptos Hills-Larkin Valley–La Selva Beach line	R6.69	431	Mar Monte Avenue	
Santa Cruz; SCR R0.00-37.45	Aptos Hills-Larkin Valley–La Selva Beach– Rio del Mar tripoint	R7.66	432	San Andreas Road, Larkin Valley Road	
Santa Cruz; SCR R0.00-37.45	Aptos Hills-Larkin Valley–Aptos– Rio del Mar tripoint	8.35	433A	Freedom Boulevard	
Santa Cruz; SCR R0.00-37.45	Aptos–Rio del Mar line	9.15	433B	Rio del Mar Boulevard	
Santa Cruz; SCR R0.00-37.45	Aptos–Seacliff line	10.54	435	State Park Drive	
Santa Cruz; SCR R0.00-37.45	Capitola–Soquel line	12.09	436	Park Avenue	
Santa Cruz; SCR R0.00-37.45	Capitola–Soquel line	13.19	437	Porter Street, Bay Avenue	
Santa Cruz; SCR R0.00-37.45	Capitola–Soquel line	13.62	438	41st Avenue	
Santa Cruz; SCR R0.00-37.45	Live Oak	14.86	439	Soquel Drive	Northbound signage just lists "Soquel Drive"
Santa Cruz; SCR R0.00-37.45	Live Oak	14.86	439	Soquel Avenue	Southbound signage just lists the separate "Soquel Avenue"
Santa Cruz; SCR R0.00-37.45	Santa Cruz	15.82	440	Morrissey Boulevard	
Santa Cruz; SCR R0.00-37.45	Santa Cruz	16.63	441A	Emeline Avenue	Northbound exit only
Santa Cruz; SCR R0.00-37.45	Santa Cruz	16.82	441B	SR 17 north – San Jose, Oakland	Signed as exit 441 southbound; SR 17 exits 1A-B
Santa Cruz; SCR R0.00-37.45	Santa Cruz	17.24	442	Ocean Street – Beaches	
Santa Cruz; SCR R0.00-37.45	Santa Cruz		Northern end of freeway		
Santa Cruz; SCR R0.00-37.45	Santa Cruz	17.56		SR 9 north (River Street) – Boulder Creek, Big Basin, Downtown Santa Cruz	
Santa Cruz; SCR R0.00-37.45	Santa Cruz	19.00		Bay Street – UC Santa Cruz	
Santa Cruz; SCR R0.00-37.45		27.62		Bonny Doon Road	
Santa Cruz; SCR R0.00-37.45		30.44		Swanton Road	
San Mateo; SM 0.00-R48.55		13.58		Pescadero Road, Pescadero State Beach	
San Mateo; SM 0.00-R48.55	San Gregorio	18.19		SR 84 east – San Gregorio, La Honda, Redwood City	
San Mateo; SM 0.00-R48.55	Half Moon Bay	29.04		SR 92 east – San Mateo	
San Mateo; SM 0.00-R48.55		R39.00	Tom Lantos Tunnels		
San Mateo; SM 0.00-R48.55	Pacifica	40.75– 40.96		Linda Mar Boulevard, San Pedro Avenue	
San Mateo; SM 0.00-R48.55	Pacifica	42.01		Rockaway Beach Avenue, Fassler Avenue – Rockaway Beach	
San Mateo; SM 0.00-R48.55	Pacifica	R42.58		Reina Del Mar Avenue	
San Mateo; SM 0.00-R48.55	Pacifica		Southern end of freeway		
San Mateo; SM 0.00-R48.55	Pacifica	R43.46	505A	Sharp Park Road, Fairway Drive – San Bruno	Signed as exit 505 southbound
San Mateo; SM 0.00-R48.55	Pacifica	R43.74	505B	Clarendon Road, Oceana Boulevard	Northbound exit only
San Mateo; SM 0.00-R48.55	Pacifica	R44.21	506	Paloma Avenue, Francisco Boulevard	Southbound exit and northbound entrance
San Mateo; SM 0.00-R48.55	Pacifica	R45.12	507	Manor Drive, Monterey Road, Palmetto Avenue	Palmetto Avenue not signed northbound; Monterey Road not signed southbound
San Mateo; SM 0.00-R48.55	Daly City	R46.72	508	SR 35 (Skyline Boulevard)	Signed as exit 508A (south) and 508B (north) southbound; SR 35 exits 54A-B
San Mateo; SM 0.00-R48.55	Daly City	R47.27	509A	Serramonte Boulevard	Northbound signage
San Mateo; SM 0.00-R48.55	Daly City	R47.27	509	Clarinada Avenue	Southbound signage
San Mateo; SM 0.00-R48.55	Daly City	R47.80	509B	I-280 south (Junipero Serra Freeway) – San Jose	Northbound signage; I-280 north exit 47
San Mateo; SM 0.00-R48.55	Daly City	48.08	510	Eastmoor Avenue	Northbound exit and southbound entrance; I-280 north exit 47
San Mateo; SM 0.00-R48.55	Daly City	R47.80 R25.28 (Note: Indicates that the postmile represents the distance along I-280 rather than SR 1.)	—	I-280 south (Junipero Serra Freeway) – San Jose	Southern end of I-280 concurrency; southbound signage; SR 1 south follows I-280 south exit 47B
San Mateo; SM 0.00-R48.55	Daly City	R28.78	48 (Note: Exit numbers follow I-280 rather than SR 1.)	Eastmoor Avenue, Sullivan Avenue	Southbound exit and northbound entrance
San Mateo; SM 0.00-R48.55	Daly City	M26.50	49A	John Daly Boulevard, Junipero Serra Boulevard	Northbound exit and southbound entrance
San Mateo; SM 0.00-R48.55	Daly City	M27.17 R48.05	—	I-280 north – San Francisco, Bay Bridge	Northern end of I-280 concurrency; SR 1 north follows I-280 north exit 49B; SR 1 southbound access via exit 49
San Mateo; SM 0.00-R48.55	Daly City	48.55	49 (Note: Although the southbound exit to John Daly Boulevard is listed as exit 511 on Caltrans' exit number list, as of 2025 signs on the highway were posted marking it as exit 49, following I-280 instead of SR 1/)	John Daly Boulevard to I-280 north	Southbound exit and northbound entrance
City and County of San Francisco; SF R0.00-7.07		R0.11		Alemany Boulevard	Northbound exit and southbound entrance
City and County of San Francisco; SF R0.00-7.07		R0.11	Northern end of freeway		
City and County of San Francisco; SF R0.00-7.07		R0.31		Brotherhood Way	Interchange; no northbound exit to Brotherhood Way east and no southbound entrance from Brotherhood Way west
City and County of San Francisco; SF R0.00-7.07		1.90		SR 35 south (Sloat Boulevard) – San Francisco Civic Center, Beach, San Francisco Zoo	No northbound left turn
City and County of San Francisco; SF R0.00-7.07		6.33	Southern end of freeway		
City and County of San Francisco; SF R0.00-7.07		6.33	MacArthur Tunnel		
City and County of San Francisco; SF R0.00-7.07		7.08 9.60		US 101 south – Marina Boulevard	Southern end of US 101 concurrency; US 101 south was former SR 480 east; US 101 exit 438
City and County of San Francisco; SF R0.00-7.07		9.71	439	Lincoln Boulevard – View Area, Presidio, Golden Gate NRA, Fort Point	Lincoln Boulevard not signed northbound
Golden Gate		11.18– L0.01	Golden Gate Bridge (Southbound toll only; no state maintenance on bridge)		
Marin; MRN 0.00-50.50	Sausalito	0.10	H. Dana Bower Rest Area and Vista Point (northbound only)		
Marin; MRN 0.00-50.50	Sausalito	0.32	442	Alexander Avenue	Last free exit for southbound traffic
Marin; MRN 0.00-50.50	Sausalito	0.89	Robin Williams Tunnel under Waldo Grade		
Marin; MRN 0.00-50.50	Sausalito	1.52	443	Spencer Avenue, Monte Mar Drive	
Marin; MRN 0.00-50.50	Sausalito	2.48	444	Rodeo Avenue (east)	Northbound exit and entrance only
Marin; MRN 0.00-50.50	Sausalito	2.48	444	Rodeo Avenue (west; not a thru road)	Southbound exit and entrance only; connects to the Rodeo Trailhead at the Golden Gate NRA
Marin; MRN 0.00-50.50	Sausalito	3.33	445A	Sausalito (Bridgeway), Marin City (Donahue Street)	
Marin; MRN 0.00-50.50	Sausalito	4.46 0.00	Northern end of freeway on US 101		
Marin; MRN 0.00-50.50	Sausalito	4.46 0.00		US 101 north – San Rafael, Eureka, Santa Rosa	Northern end of US 101 concurrency; US 101 exit 445B
Marin; MRN 0.00-50.50	Olema	26.51		Sir Francis Drake Boulevard – San Rafael	
Sonoma; SON 0.00-58.58	Jenner	20.10		SR 116 east (River Road) – Guerneville	
Mendocino; MEN 0.00-105.57		40.27		SR 128 east to US 101 – Cloverdale, Boonville	
Mendocino; MEN 0.00-105.57	Albion River	43.74	Albion River Bridge		
Mendocino; MEN 0.00-105.57	Russian Gulch Creek	52.64	Frederick W. Panhorst Bridge		
Mendocino; MEN 0.00-105.57	Fort Bragg	59.80		SR 20 east – Willits	
Mendocino; MEN 0.00-105.57	Fort Bragg	60.23	Noyo River Bridge		
Mendocino; MEN 0.00-105.57	Leggett	105.50		SR 271 south – Leggett, Drive Thru Tree Road	Former US 101
Mendocino; MEN 0.00-105.57	Leggett	105.57		US 101 – Ukiah, Eureka	Northern terminus
1.000 mi = 1.609 km; 1.000 km = 0.621 mi: Closed/former; Concurrency terminus; Electronic toll collection; Incomplete access

== In popular culture ==
Tim Buckley's 1969 album Happy Sad includes a song with the title "Love from Room 109 at the Islander (On Pacific Coast Highway)".

R & B group Con Funk Shun released a song titled "California 1" on their 1981 album Con Funk Shun 7.

In 1999, the Red Hot Chili Peppers released a song titled "Road Trippin'" on the Californication album. It describes a surfing trip along the Big Sur portion of the highway.

In 2002, the Decemberists released a song titled "California One/Youth and Beauty Brigade" on their album Castaways and Cutouts.

In 2008, Old 97's released a song titled "The One" on their album Blame It on Gravity. The song reminisces about their early days as a band being flown from Texas out to Los Angeles to be courted by various big record company labels. In this delightful reimagining, the band ultimately decides it would be easier and more fun to become bank robbers instead, and they make their escape along this famous route ("Let's take The One!").

In 2012, the Beach Boys released a song titled "Pacific Coast Highway" on the album That's Why God Made the Radio. Described by critics as "introspective", "autumnal", and "hymnlike", the song takes the perspective of an aged person driving down the highway during sunset as he reflects on his advancing years in life, deciding that he is more comfortable living alone.
