= Rincon Parkway =

Automobile route along coastline of Ventura County, California that opened in 1913

- Pacific Coast Highway
- Interactive map of Rincon Parkway
- Former name: Rincon Sea Level Road
- Part of: US 101 / SR 1 (Pacific Coast Highway)
- Namesake: Rancho El Rincon
- Type: Historic
- Length: 12 mi (19 km)
- Postal code: 93001
- Coordinates: 34°21′20″N 119°26′10″W

Construction
- Commissioned: 1911
- Completed: 1913

Other
- Known for: One of the original U.S. Routes (US 101)
- Website: www.ventura.org/beach-front-parks/rincon-parkway

The Rincon Parkway is a portion of California State Route 1 along the north coast of Ventura County, California. This narrow coastal area north of the city of Ventura and south of the Santa Barbara County line is commonly referred to as The Rincon. The automobile route along this portion of coastline opened up in 1913 as the Rincon Causeway or the Rincon Sea Level Road as the first driveable coastal route for motorists traveling between San Francisco and Los Angeles, California. The access road alongside the railroad bed, that cut through the area in 1886, provided the basis for building the Rincon Sea Level Road.

== History ==
Historical travel by foot or horseback along the small alluvial fan beaches and coastal bluffs had to wait for the low tide due to the rock outcroppings which have always made travel difficult along this dramatic meeting of the Santa Ynez Mountains with the Pacific Ocean. A safer but longer and steeper route was over Casitas Pass and is the more likely route used to travel between Mission San Buenaventura and Mission Santa Barbara than the El Camino Real as designated with commemorative bell markers. Stagecoaches along the coast were delayed by high tides, storms, mud or rock slides before an alternate route was established in 1878, over the inland Casitas Pass that was accessed by traveling through the narrow Ventura River Valley towards Ojai. The route over the Casitas Pass was still used for stagecoach travel to the Santa Barbara area after the opening of a tunnel through the San Fernando Pass in 1876 which completed the inland railroad route and provided an alternate means of travel to northern California.

As the automobile age began, motorists had to follow the Ventura River Valley towards Nordhoff to the road over Casitas Pass. Civic boosters were eager to open the more direct coastal route. The moment arrived with the construction of the Coast Line by Southern Pacific Railroad. The construction of the railroad had provided an unimproved road flanked by rip-rap but it was often flooded in several sections from the ocean waves.

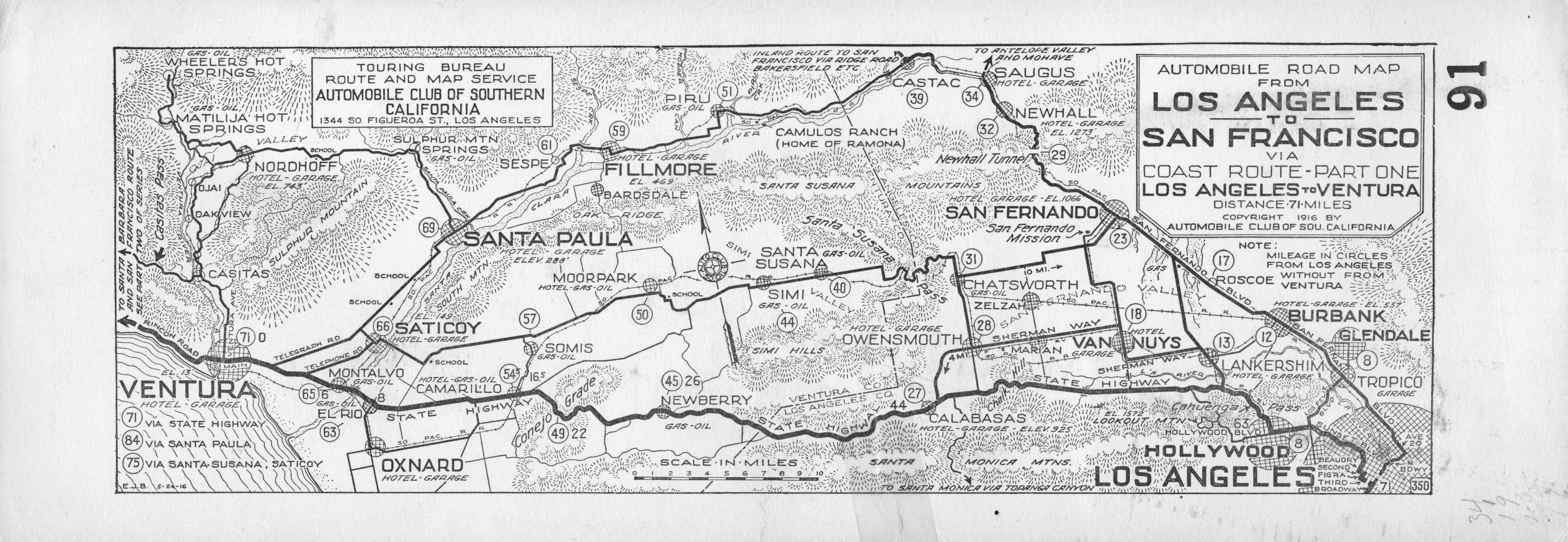
Map of automobile road from Los Angeles to San Francisco via coast route shows Rincon Road.

Civic boosters started raising funds locally to pave the road and build wooden causeways where needed. Ventura resident E. P. Foster was a leader in this effort together with Franklin E. Kellogg, secretary of the Santa Barbara Chamber of Commerce. Sufficient funds to complete the project had not been raised locally when the newly formed State Highway Commission took over and completed the road. Waves hit the pilings during storm surges and regular maintenance was required. In 1926, US 101 was established as one of the original U.S. Routes. The road was modernized with a concrete seawall and the "rickey elevated road was scrapped".

Motor Age magazine from the era described the project in some detail.

The method of construction is simple. Eucalyptus piles are driven, cross-beams are laid, then the floor of the causeway, and the wooden railings on each side. Asphalt will in time be laid. All causeways are twenty feet wide.

A new bridge over the Ventura River also opened in 1913 when the causeways were complete being forerunners to the impact automobiles would have in the 1920s.

In 1960, a freeway bypass was completed from Emma Wood State Beach north to the Mobil Pier Undercrossing near Sea Cliff. US 101 was then re-routed onto this freeway bypass, while the original two-lane alignment of this portion of the Rincon Sea Level Road was re-signed as part of State Route 1. In other segments of the old Rincon Sea Level Road, US 101 has been upgraded to either a four-lane freeway or expressway.

== Recreation ==
The beaches along the coast are a popular destination for day use with recreational vehicle camping available along the edge of the roadway in several areas. As part of the California Coastal Trail, the bike route is popular with a mix of road and designated bike paths.

== See also ==
History of California's state highway system
