= Presidio (disambiguation) =

A presidio is a Spanish fortified base established in the early modern era, e.g. in the Mediterranean, the Philippines, or North America.

Presidio may also refer to:

- The Presidio (film), a film starring Sean Connery
- Presidio, Texas, a place in the State of Texas in the United States of America
- Presidio School of Management, an educational institution
- Presidio of San Francisco, National Park Service site and former Army base in San Francisco, United States
- Presidio of Monterey, California, an active United States Army installation in Monterey, California
- AMD Presidio, a computing platform developed by Advanced Micro Devices
- Park Presidio Boulevard, street in San Francisco, California, which carries California State Route 1

== See also ==
- State of the Presidi
