= California State Route 225 =

Highway in California

State Route 225
- SR 225's last routing highlighted in red

Route information
- Maintained by Caltrans
- Length: 4.643 mi (7.472 km)
- Existed: 1963–2014

Major junctions
- West end: SR 1 / US 101 in Santa Barbara
- East end: SR 1 / US 101 in Santa Barbara

Location
- Country: United States
- State: California
- Counties: Santa Barbara

Highway system
- State highways in California; Interstate; US; State; Scenic; History; Pre‑1964; Unconstructed; Deleted; Freeways
← SR 224	→ SR 227

State Route 225 (SR 225) is a decommissioned state highway in the U.S. state of California that was a loop route of U.S. Route 101 that served the beach areas of the Santa Barbara area. The route was originally defined in 1963. In 2014, control of the highway was transferred from the state to the city of Santa Barbara, effectively decommissioning it. While the California State Legislature has not yet removed its definition from section 525 of the California Streets and Highways Code, the highway is no longer valid in the Caltrans-maintained postmile database and logs.

== Route description ==
Route 225 remains defined in section 525, subdivision (a), of the California Streets and Highways Code, last amended by the California State Legislature in 2011, and that the highway is "from Route 101 near Santa Barbara to Route 101 near the Santa Barbara Central Business District". Subdivision (b) permitted the state to relinquish control of the entire segment in Santa Barbara to the city, and "Route 225 shall cease to be a state highway" after it is transferred.

SR 225 was a route that closely followed the beaches of the city of Santa Barbara. It started off near the Earl Warren Showgrounds at the junction of U.S. Route 101 and Las Positas Road and headed south towards the coast before turning east on Cliff Drive. It then climbed up a small viaduct before descending near Santa Barbara City College and ended at Castillo Street and US 101.

== History ==
Until 1998, SR 225 followed Cabrillo Boulevard along the beach, ending near Montecito. On January 30, 2014, Caltrans transferred control of SR 225 to the city of Santa Barbara. However, the route remains defined in section 525 of the California Streets and Highways Code, last amended by the California State Legislature in 2011.

== Major intersections ==
Except where prefixed with a letter, postmiles were measured on the road as it was in 1964, based on the alignment that existed at the time, and do not necessarily reflect current mileage. Postmile prefixes include: R reflecting a realignment in the route since then, M indicating a second realignment, L referring to an overlap due to a correction or change, and T indicating postmiles classified as temporary. Segments that remain unconstructed or have been relinquished to local control may be omitted. The entire route is in Santa Barbara, Santa Barbara County.

Postmile	Destinations	Notes
0.00	Las Positas Road	Continuation beyond US 101
0.00	US 101 (SR 1)	Interchange; west end of SR 225
R4.64	US 101 (SR 1)	Interchange; east end of SR 225
R4.64	Castillo Street	Continuation beyond US 101
1.000 mi = 1.609 km; 1.000 km = 0.621 mi
