= Airport Tunnel (Los Angeles) =

Tunnel in Los Angeles, California, US

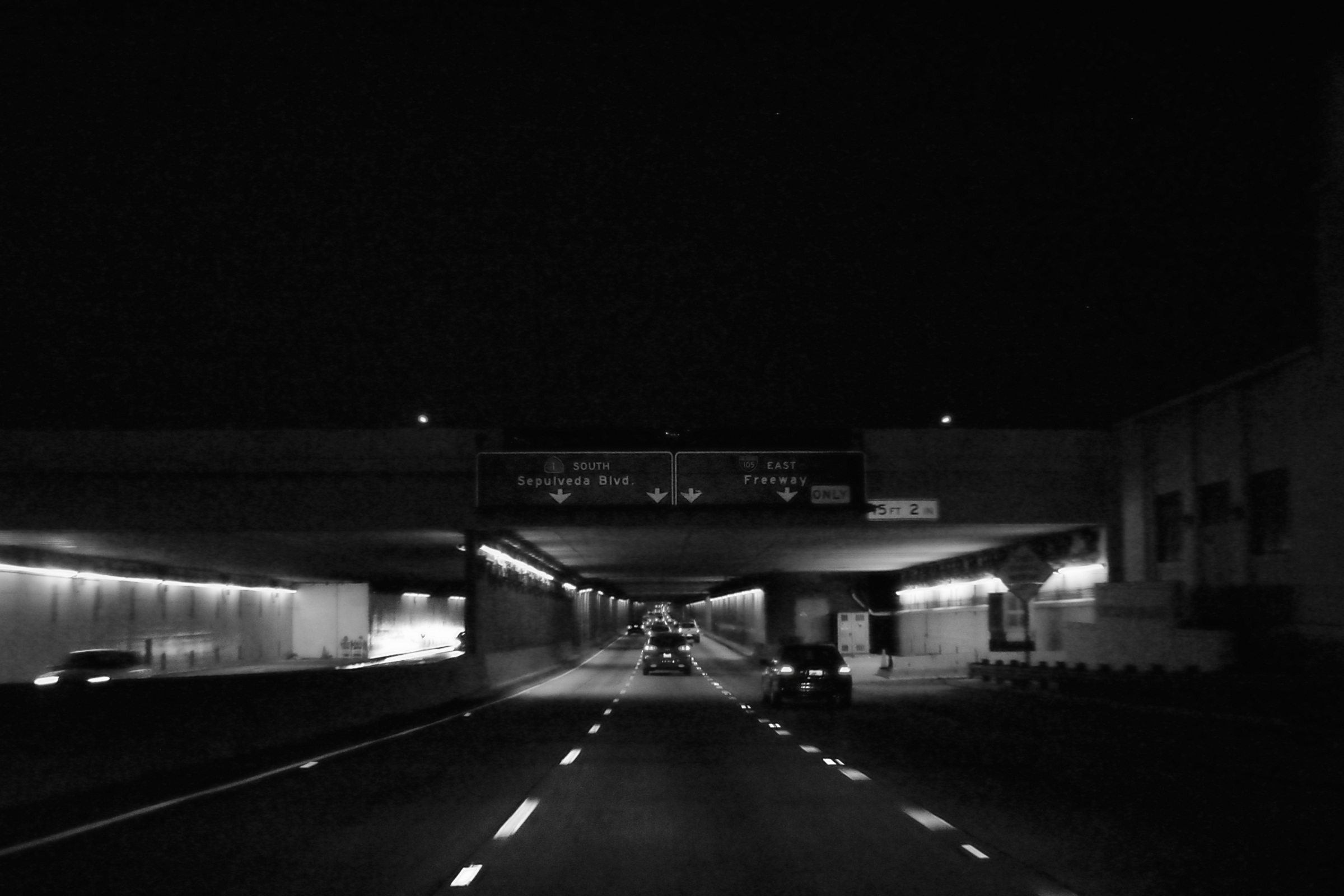
- The northern portal of the Airport Tunnel at night

Overview
- Other names: Sepulveda Boulevard Tunnel; Sepulveda Tunnel; LAX Tunnel
- Location: Los Angeles International Airport; Los Angeles, California
- Coordinates: 33°56′25″N 118°23′46″W
- Status: Open
- Route: SR 1 / Sepulveda Boulevard
- Crosses: Runways and taxiways on the south side of Los Angeles International Airport
- Start: Near I-105
- End: Near Century Boulevard

Operation
- Work began: October 1949
- Opened: April 21, 1953; 73 years ago
- Owner: Caltrans; City of Los Angeles

Technical
- Length: 1,909 feet (582 m)
- No. of lanes: 6 (3 in each direction)
- Operating speed: 40 mph (64 km/h)
- Tunnel clearance: 15–15.08 feet (4.57–4.60 m) (northbound); 15.17 feet (4.62 m) (southbound)
- Width: 80 feet (24 m)

The Airport Tunnel, also known as the Sepulveda Boulevard Tunnel, is a highway tunnel in Los Angeles, carrying Sepulveda Boulevard underneath the two runways (25L/25R) and taxiways on the south side of the Los Angeles International Airport (LAX). This section of Sepulveda is a part of California State Route 1. The tunnel was the first in the United States to run under an airport runway.

== History ==
In the late-1940s, LAX (then known as Mines Field) was set to have its runways extended. However, Sepulveda Boulevard stood in the way, largely prohibiting the possibility of expansion. Initially, the thoroughfare was rerouted to go around the western end of the runways. In a move to allow Sepulveda Boulevard to return to its original straight-line path, Airport Tunnel was created. The US$3.5 million (equivalent to $63 million in 2025) of funding for the project was split between a 1945 bond issue and a federal grant. Construction began in October 1949 and was completed by March 1953.

An opening ceremony, held on April 21, 1953, was officiated by Los Angeles Mayor Fletcher Bowron and the first 100 motorists to pass through the tunnel received souvenirs. The tunnel was considered experimental at the time, as the concept had never been built before.

The tunnel featured some complex engineering for its time. Two ventilation houses with four fans each were built to both push fresh air into the tunnel and pull out exhaust fumes and a power substation was built to supply energy to the thousands of vapor lights in the tunnel and the eight fans. Rainwater is gathered by a drain system and empties into vaults where the water is pumped out.

The road has six lanes (three in each direction) along with six turnouts, each large enough to hold three cars, for vehicles that break down in the tunnel.

Over the years, motorists complained about the poor lighting in the tunnel being a safety hazard. The lighting system was overhauled in 1965 and was revamped with LED lights in 2012. Due to exhaust soot buildup, the tunnel is periodically closed for cleaning.

== See also ==
- LAX color tunnels
