= California State Route 224 =

Former state highway in California

State Route 224

- SR 224's former routing highlighted in red

Route information
- Maintained by Caltrans
- Length: 1.8 mi (2.9 km)
- Existed: 1964–1996

Major junctions
- South end: Carpinteria State Beach
- North end: US 101 in Carpinteria

Location
- Country: United States
- State: California
- Counties: Santa Barbara

Highway system
- State highways in California; Interstate; US; State; Scenic; History; Pre‑1964; Unconstructed; Deleted; Freeways
← SR 223	→ SR 225

State Route 224 (SR 224) was a state highway in the U.S. state of California that served as a spur route in Santa Barbara County from U.S. Route 101 in Carpinteria to Carpinteria State Beach. The route existed from 1964 to 1996.

== Route description ==
The route ran from Route 101 at its junction with, and south on, Casitas Pass Road in Carpinteria. Route 224 then turned west on Carpinteria Avenue before heading south along Palm Avenue, ending at Carpinteria State Beach.

== History ==
In 1933, a road from Carpinteria to the state park was added to the state highway system. It was given the number of Route 152 in 1935. SR 224 was defined in the 1964 state highway renumbering. The route was deleted in 1996 by the California State Legislature.

== Junction list ==
Except where prefixed with a letter, postmiles were measured on the road as it was in 1964, based on the alignment that existed at the time, and do not necessarily reflect current mileage. Postmile prefixes include: R reflecting a realignment in the route since then, M indicating a second realignment, L referring to an overlap due to a correction or change, and T indicating postmiles classified as temporary. Segments that remain unconstructed or have been relinquished to local control may be omitted. The entire route was in Carpinteria, Santa Barbara County.

Postmile	Destinations	Notes
R0.00	US 101	
R1.80	Carpinteria State Beach	
1.000 mi = 1.609 km; 1.000 km = 0.621 mi
