= Thornton State Beach =

State park in California, United States

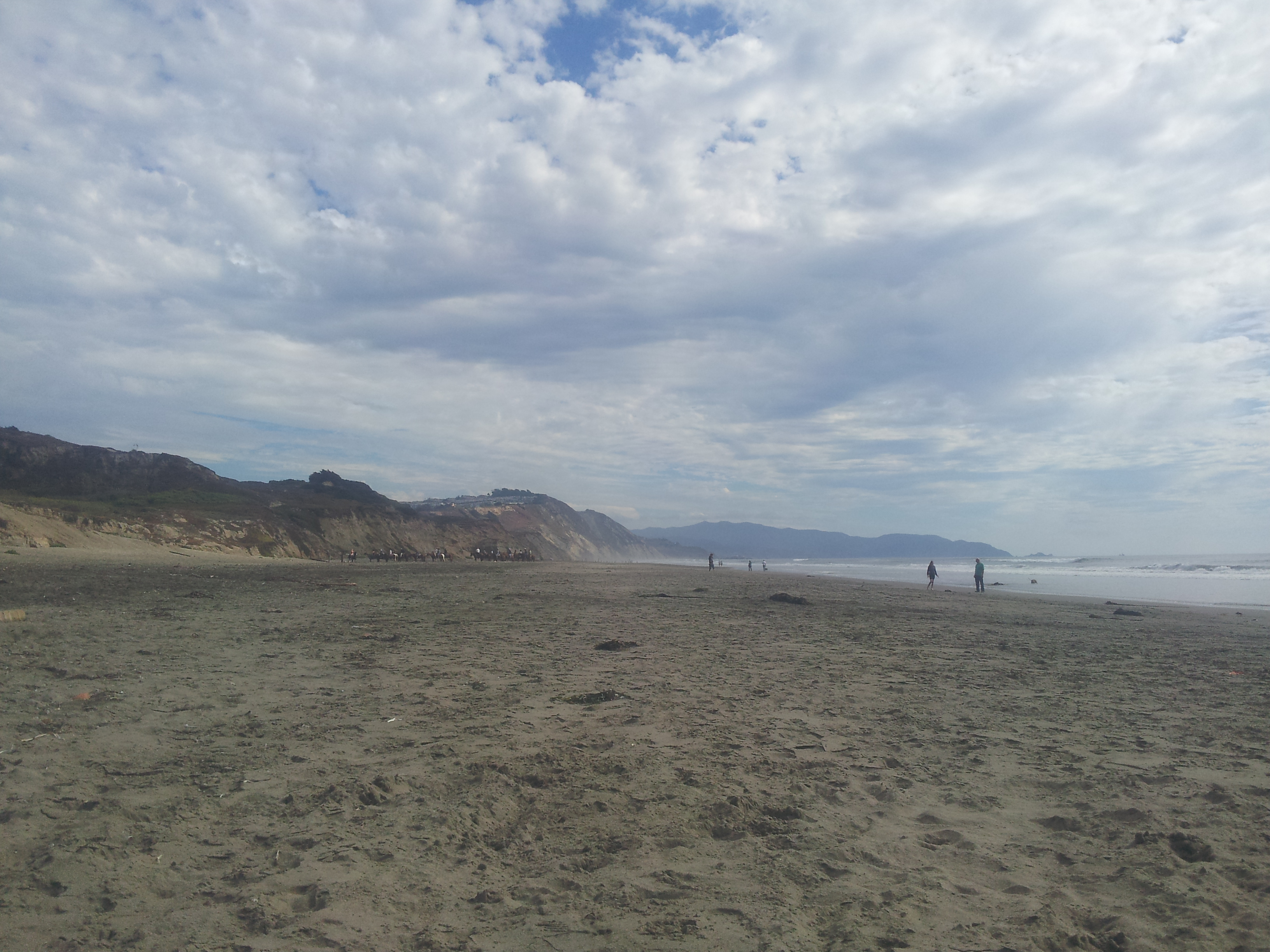

- Location within California Location within the United States
- Location: San Mateo County, California, United States
- Nearest city: Daly City, California
- Coordinates: 37°41′N 122°30′W
- Area: 58 acres (23 ha)
- Established: 1955
- Governing body: California Department of Parks and Recreation

Thornton State Beach is a protected beach in the state park system of California, United States. It is located on the Pacific coast of Daly City in the San Francisco Bay Area. The 58-acre (23 ha) park was established in 1955.

The Mediterranean climate tends toward cold and wind, with fog common in summer.

The beach was named for the first white settler of the area, one Robert S. Thornton of Rhode Island, a blacksmith who had arrived in the San Francisco area in 1851.

The park was closed in 2009 due to damage and continued danger from landslides, but as of late 2021 is fully open.

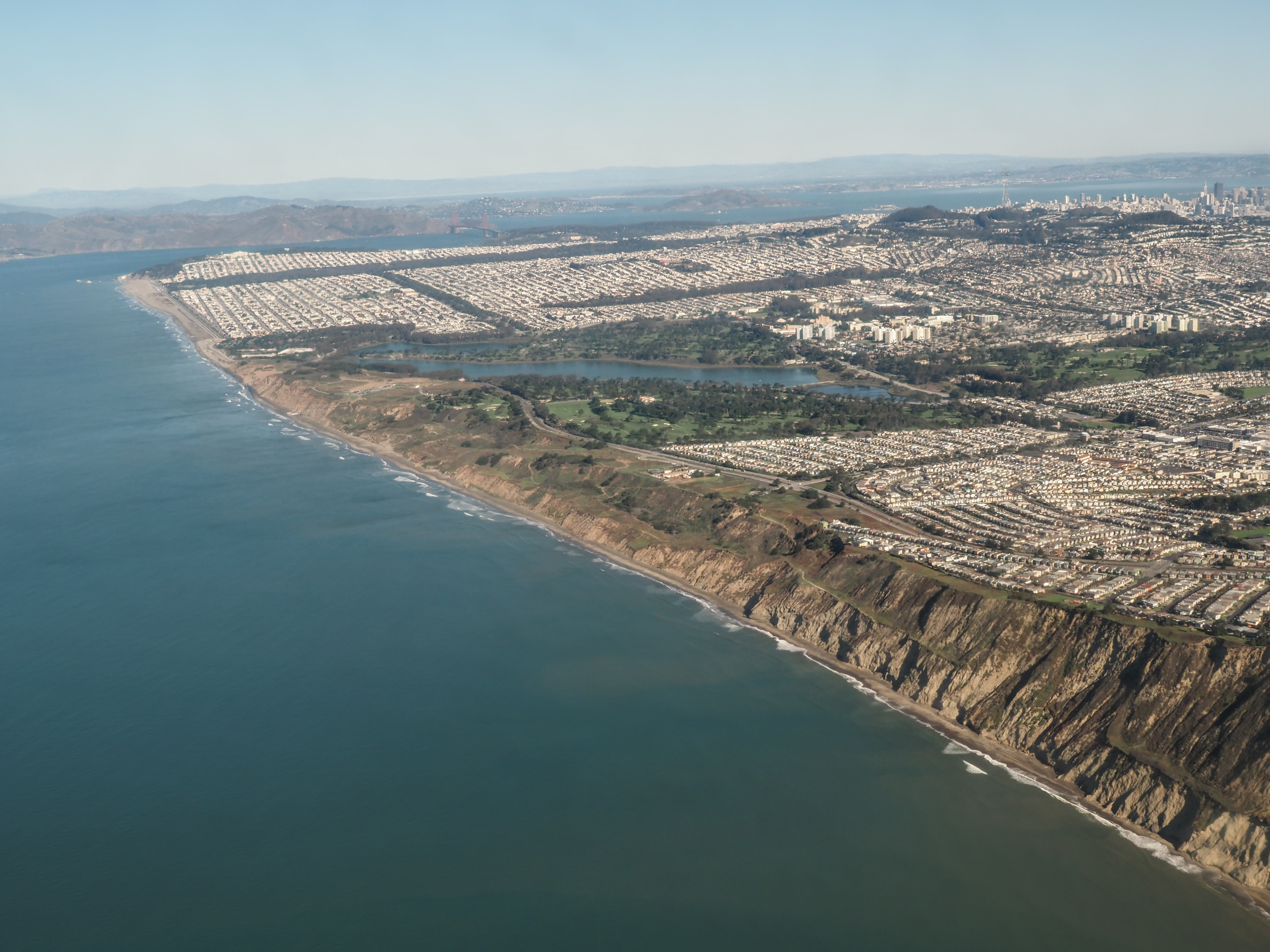
Aerial view of Thornton State Beach (center) and other beaches through San Francisco's Ocean Beach, with Fort Funston atop the bluffs and San Francisco in the background

== See also ==
- List of California state parks
