= Park Presidio Boulevard =

Road and park in San Francisco, California, USA

- Part of: SR 1
- Maintained by: Caltrans and San Francisco Recreation & Parks Department
- South end: Golden Gate Park
- Major junctions: Geary Boulevard, California Street
- North end: Presidio of San Francisco

Park Presidio Boulevard is a road and park located on the West Side of San Francisco, California, which connects Golden Gate Park to the Presidio of San Francisco. It carries California State Route 1 along its entire route.

The land was purchased in 1903, for the sum of $360,000, as an extension of Golden Gate Park.

Running from Crossover Drive near the John F. Kennedy Drive overpass inside Golden Gate Park westward, it turns north and runs between 14th Avenue and Funston Avenue in the Richmond District. Here, the tree-lined boulevard acts as a noise barrier for the adjacent streets. A gravel trail also runs on the east side of the road. At the northern terminus at Lake Street, the road continues into the Presidio as Veterans Boulevard.
