= Sea Cliff, California =

Unincorporated community in California, United States

- Unincorporated community
- Location within California Location within the United States
- Coordinates: 34°20′29″N 119°24′55″W
- Country: United States
- State: California
- County: Ventura
- Elevation: 10 ft (3.0 m)
- Time zone: UTC-8 (Pacific (PST))
  - Summer (DST): UTC-7 (PDT)
- ZIP code: 93001
- Area code: 805
- GNIS feature ID: 254228

Sea Cliff or Seacliff is an unincorporated community in Ventura County, California, United States. The 11-acre (4.5 ha) shoreline group of homes is along U.S. Route 101 and California State Route 1 (the Pacific Coast Highway), about 9 miles (14 km) northwest of Ventura. Known as Seacliff Beach Colony, the gated community contains 49 homes. In 1991, the community was evacuated for a week after a train derailment on the rail line between Los Angeles and San Francisco spilled hydrazine in the area. The homeowners reached an agreement in 2005 to purchase the property from the land company, Seacliff Land LLC. They were all previously leasing the land from Seacliff, which owned the property on which their homes were built.
