= Mendocino Coast Botanical Gardens =

Botanical gardens in Fort Bragg, California, United States

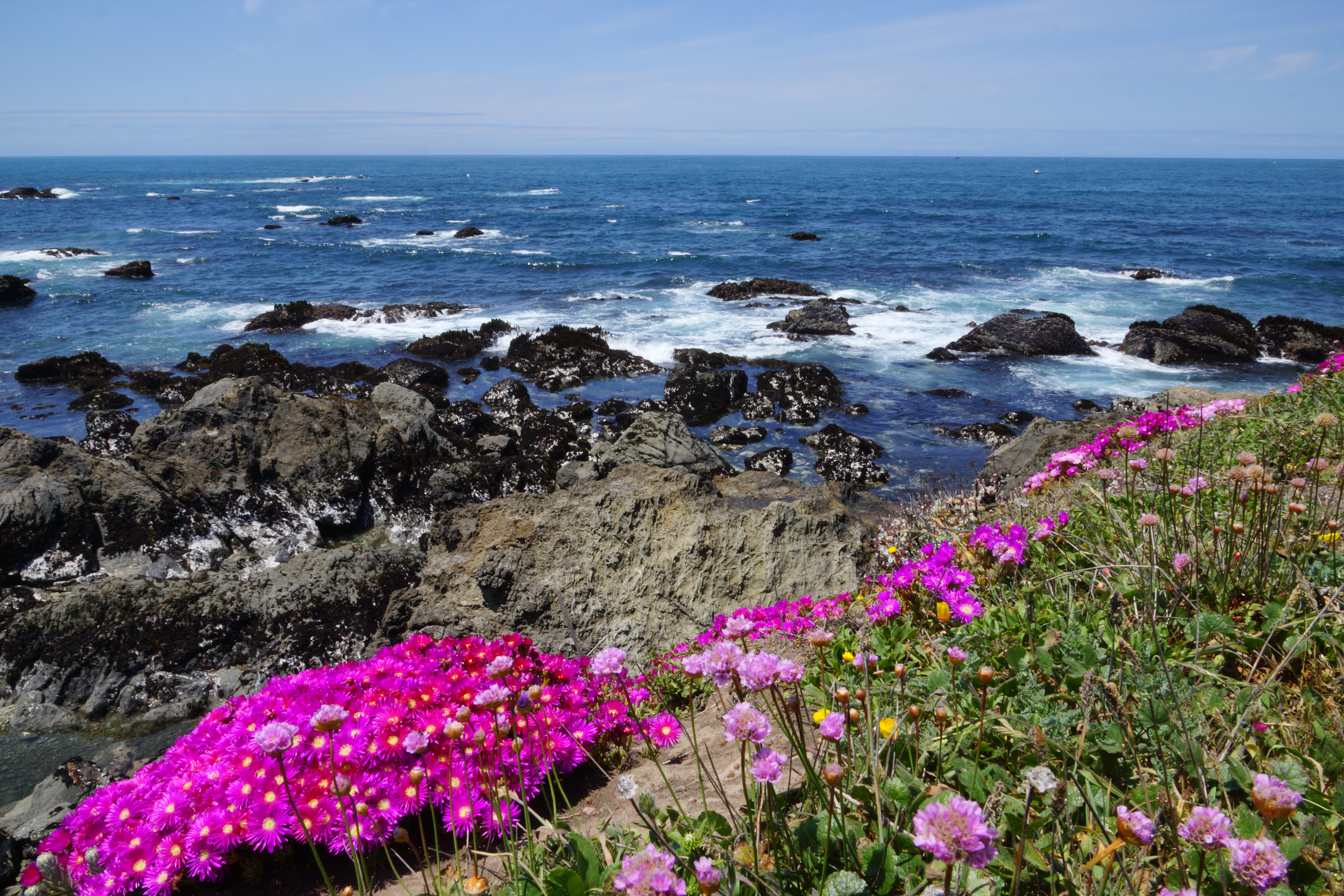
- The Gardens feature over 2,100 feet (640 m) of pristine natural coastline
- Location in Mendocino County, California
- Type: Botanical garden
- Location: Mendocino County, California, United States
- Nearest town: Fort Bragg
- Coordinates: 39°24′29″N 123°48′50″W
- Area: 47 acres (19 hectares)
- Established: 1961
- Opened: May 6, 1966; 60 years ago
- Founder: Ernest and Betty Schoefer
- Designer: Ernest Schoefer
- Owner: Mendocino Coast Recreation and Park District
- Visitors: 86,000 (in 2017)
- Open: Apr–Oct: 9AM–5PM; Nov–Mar: 9AM–4PM
- Designation: California Coastal National Monument
- Website: www.gardenbythesea.org

The Mendocino Coast Botanical Gardens (MCBG) are located on 47 acres (19 hectares) in Mendocino County, California, 2/3 mile (1.1 km) south of Fort Bragg, between California's Shoreline Highway and the Pacific Ocean. The garden property includes canyons, wetlands, coastal bluffs and a closed-cone conifer forest.

The Gardens comprise plant collections suited to its mild, coastal Mediterranean climate and acidic soils, including: native forests and bluff flora, heaths, heathers, rhododendrons, camellias, fuchsias, dahlias, magnolias, maples, succulents, begonias and conifers. The Heath and Heather Collection is part of the National Plant Consortium. MCBG is also recognized as a conifer reference collection by the American Conifer Society. A historic corridor on the south side of the property includes the 19th Century Parrish Family home, orchard and cemetery. In 2013, the demonstration "kitchen garden" developed there provided more than 4,000 lb (1,800 kg) of fresh produce to the local food bank while testing heritage and newly-developed varieties for local success and demonstrating best practices in food gardening for volunteers and visitors.

Admission is charged for entrance to the Gardens, with discounts for children and seniors or through purchase of an annual membership. Both main trails are wheelchair accessible and electric carts are offered on a first-come/first-served basis for visitors with mobility issues. Special ticket purchase is required for fundraising events, including "Art in the Gardens" in August, the "Festival of Lights" on December weekends and a biannual "My Garden" event in May. The Gardens are closed every year on the Saturday following Labor Day for the annual WineSong fundraiser supporting the Adventist Health Mendocino Coast hospital.

== History ==
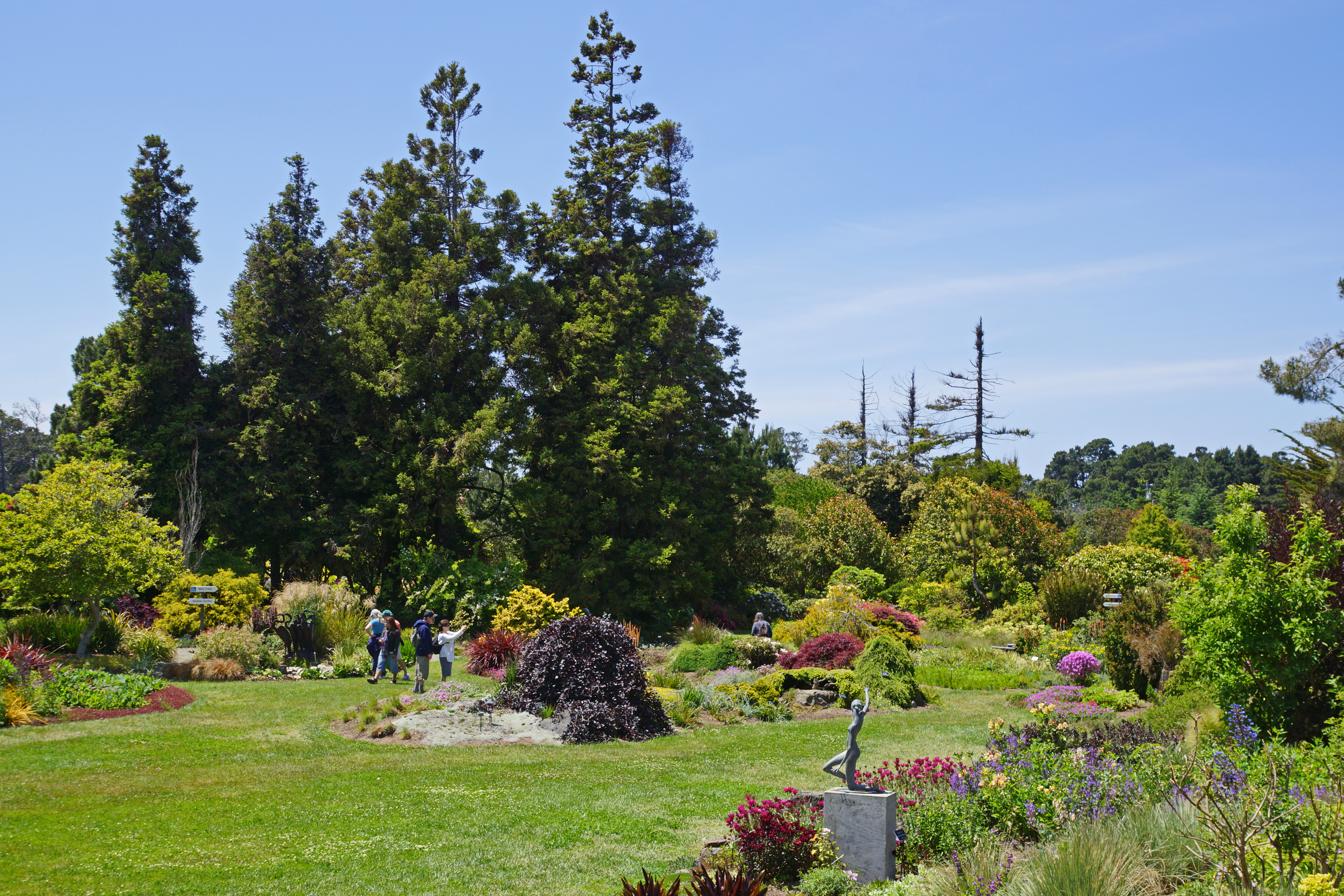
Visitors in the gardens

The Gardens were founded in 1961 by Ernest and Betty Schoefer. For the next 16 years, the Schoefers managed the garden as a private enterprise. In 1978, the property was sold to three investors who, in 1980 sold it to another group of investors who formed Garden Land Partners (GLP) as a limited partnership.

In 1982, the California Coastal Conservancy provided a grant of $232,000 ($774,000 in 2025) to the Mendocino Coast Recreation and Park District (MCRPD) to acquire 12 acres (4.9 hectares) of the original 47 acre garden, an access easement over 5 acres (2.0 hectares) of coastal bluffs, and an easement for 25 parking spaces adjacent to Shoreline Highway. This 12-acre property was leased to the Mendocino Coast Botanical Gardens Preservation Corporation (MCBGPC), a 501(c)(3) non-profit organization, which is responsible for its management and day-to-day operations.

In 1988, when the remaining 35 acres (14 hectares) of the original gardens was available for purchase, the Mendocino County Board of Supervisors and MCRPD asked the Coastal Conservancy to consider funding acquisition of the additional land to be added to the gardens. In June 1988, the Coastal Conservancy gave a $50,000 grant to MCRPD for preparation of a detailed Master Plan for the Gardens. The result was the Mendocino Coast Botanical Gardens Coastal Restoration Plan, presented to the Coastal Conservancy on June 22, 1990.

In June 1991, the Coastal Conservancy reached a unanimous decision to provide a grant of two million dollars to the MCRPD to purchase the remaining 35 acres held by GLP. This restored the Gardens to its original 47 acres, with the title held by Mendocino Coast Recreation and Park District under strict conditions that read:

"The real property is being acquired to accomplish the purposes of the Mendocino Coast Botanical Gardens Restoration Plan, adopted by the Conservancy on June 22, 1990. These purposes include protection of the natural and man-made resources of the Botanical Gardens, preservation of public access, and expansion of recreational opportunities."

MCRPD in turn agreed to a 25-year lease of the property to Gardens Preservation Corporation for $1/year, ending in 2016.

== Image gallery ==
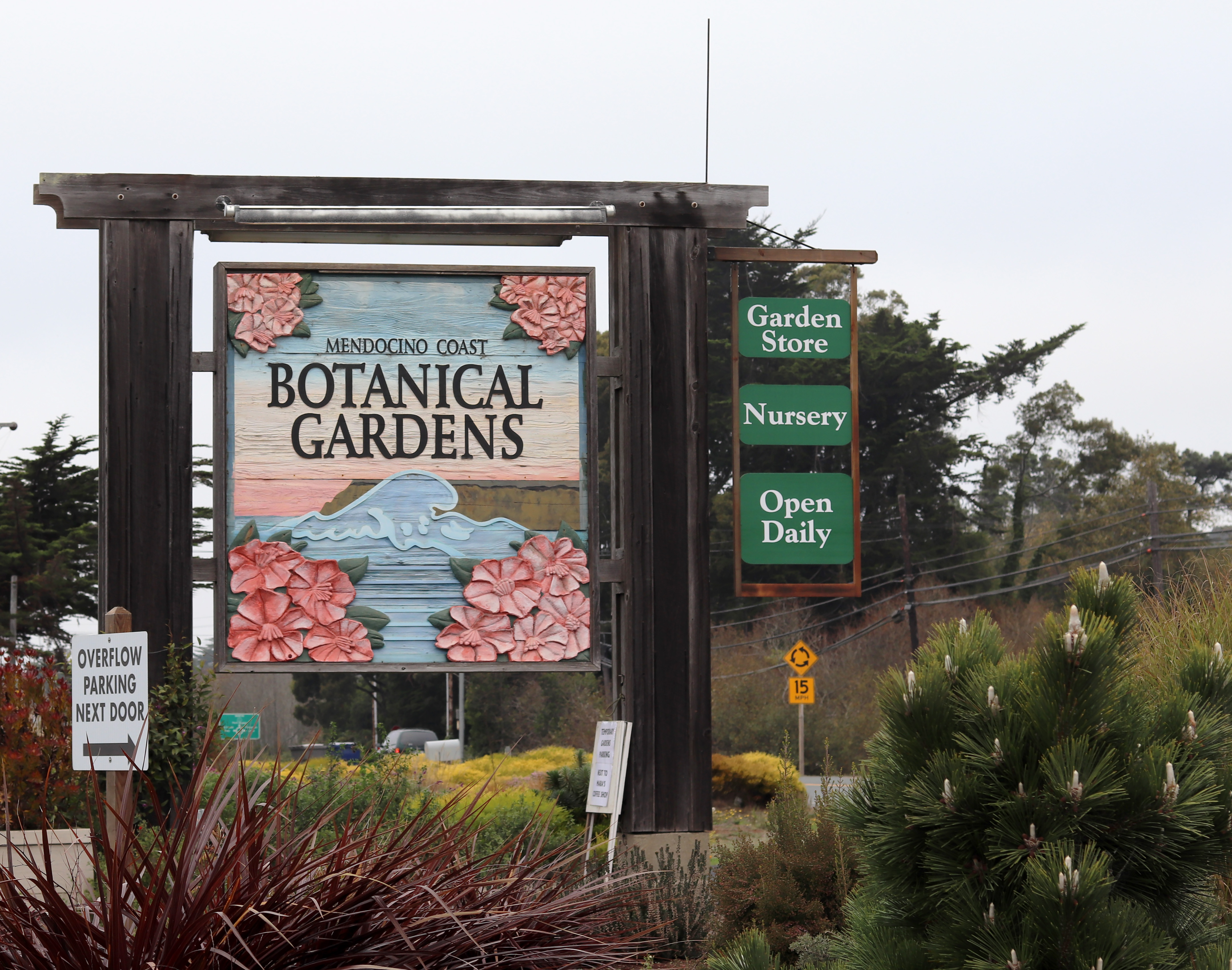
Entrance sign

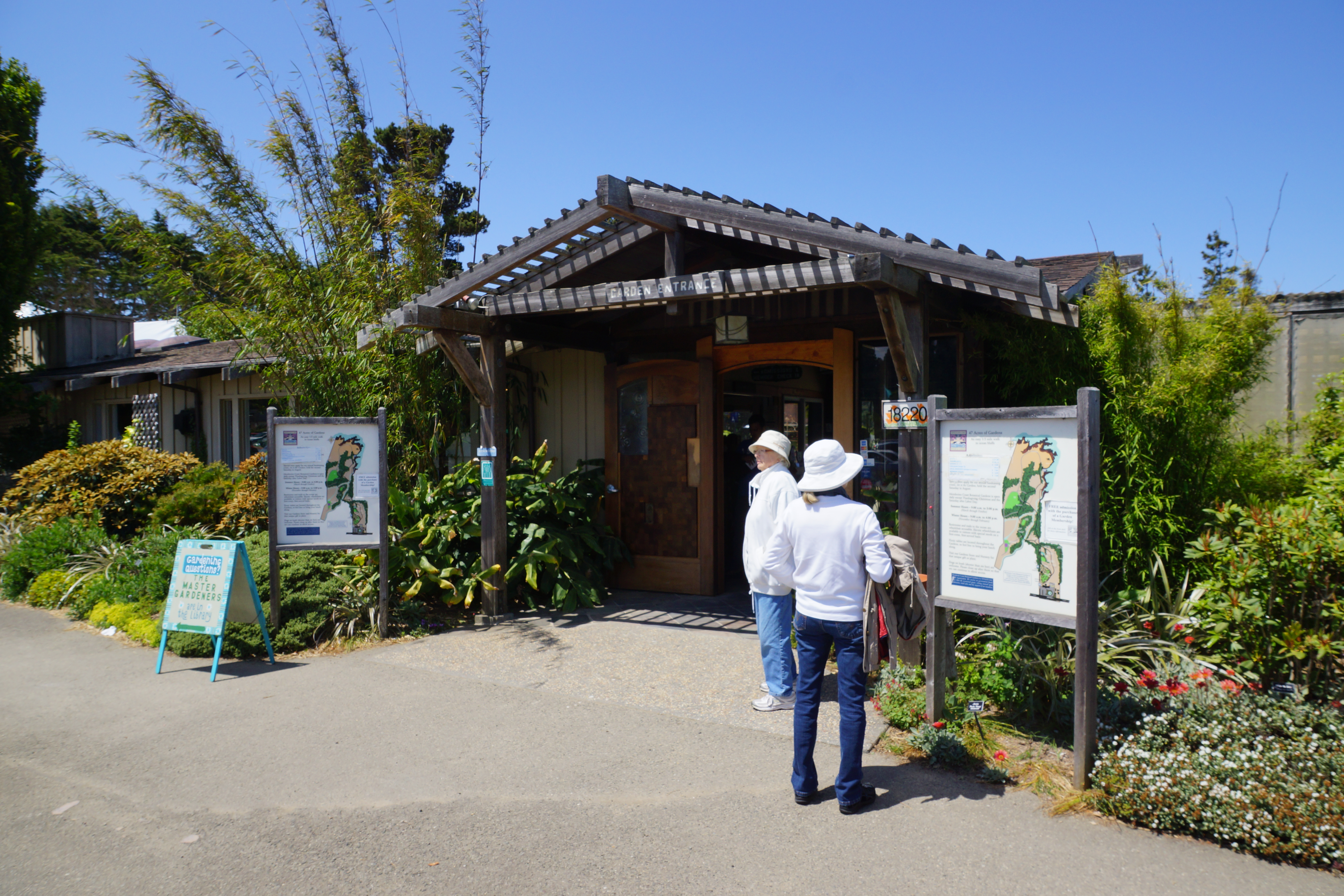
Rhody's Garden Café

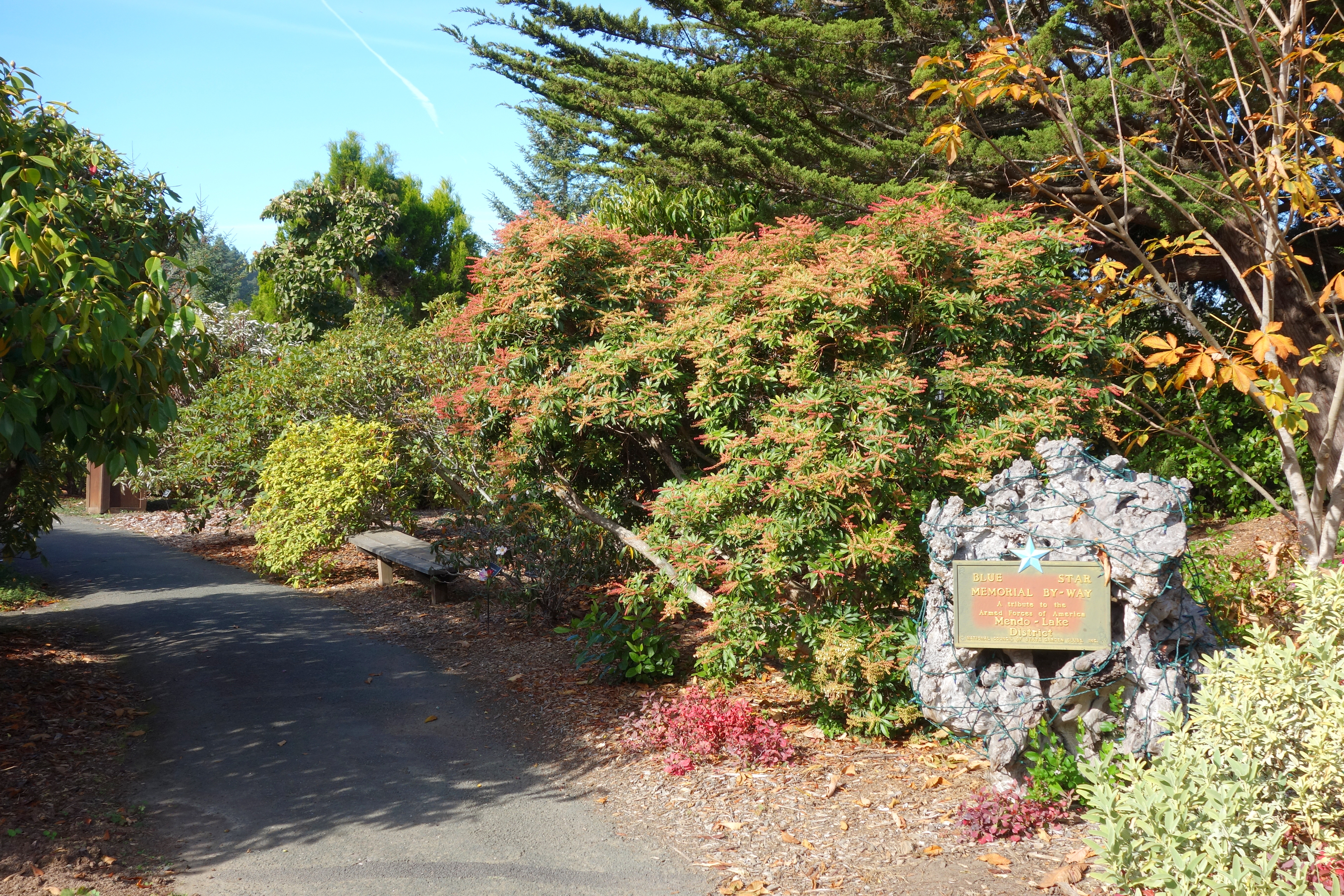
Blue Star Memorial By-Way sign, honoring American soldiers and veterans

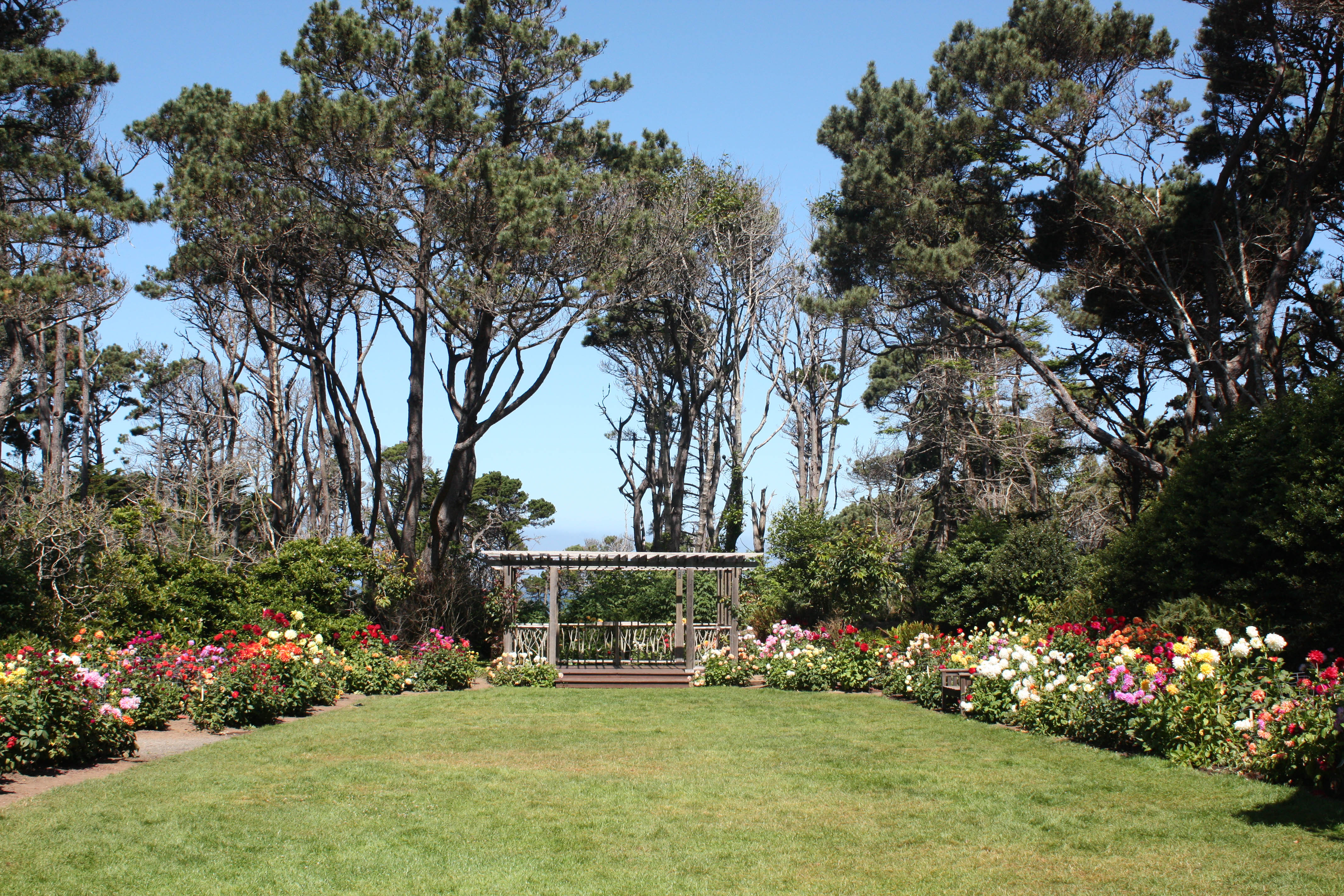
Dahlia Garden

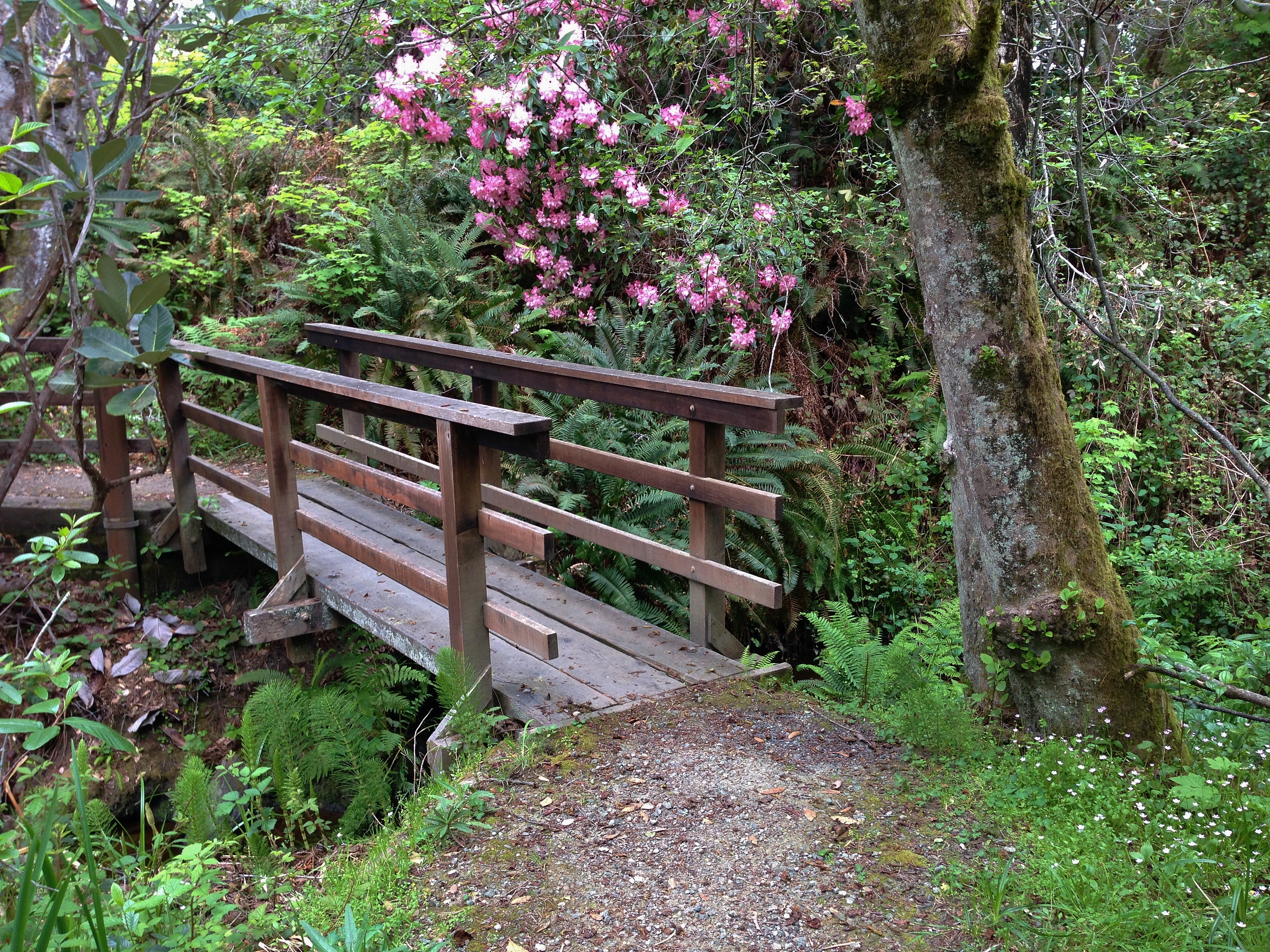
South Trail bridge crossing Digger Creek

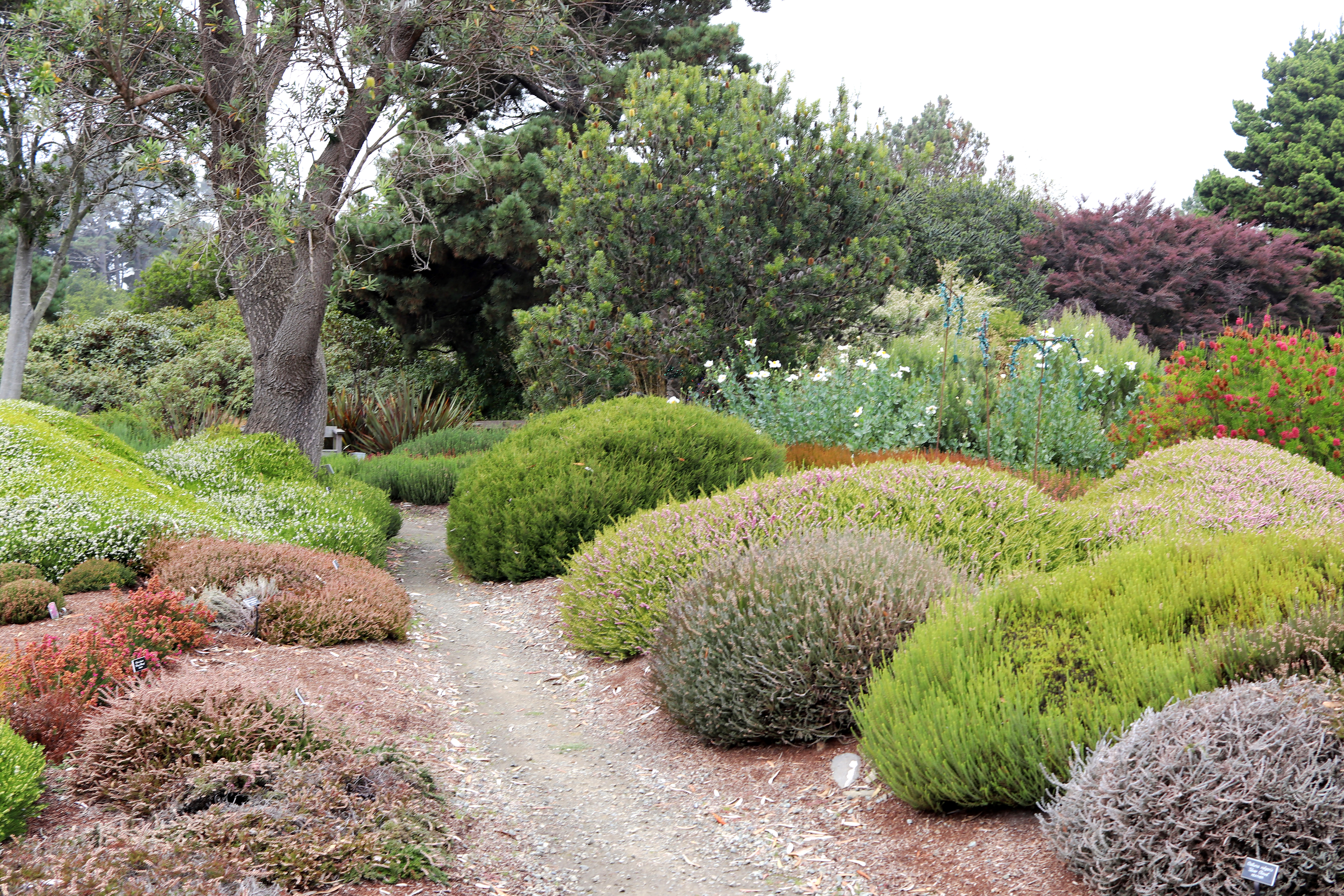
Heath & Heather Collection

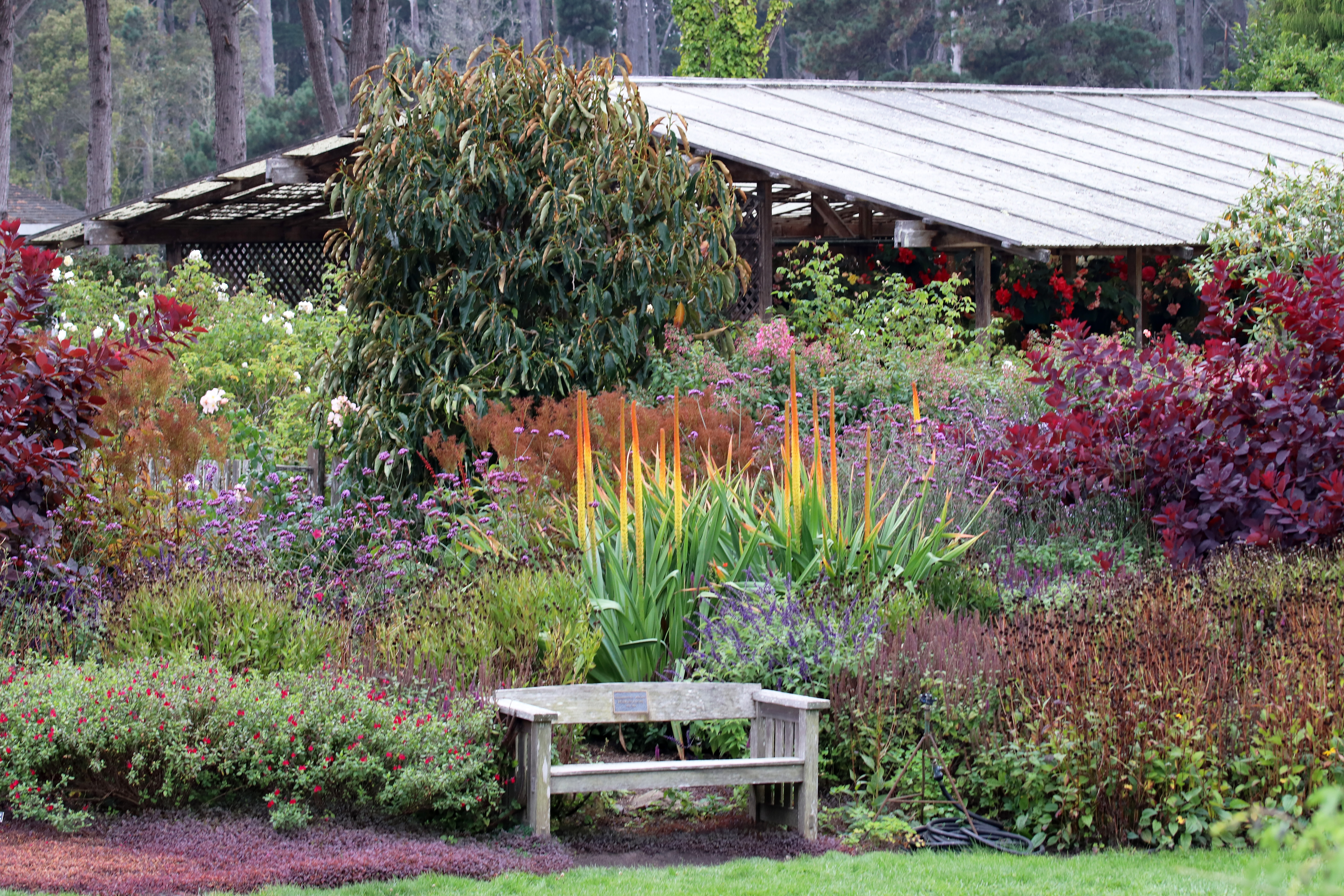
Magnolia Collection

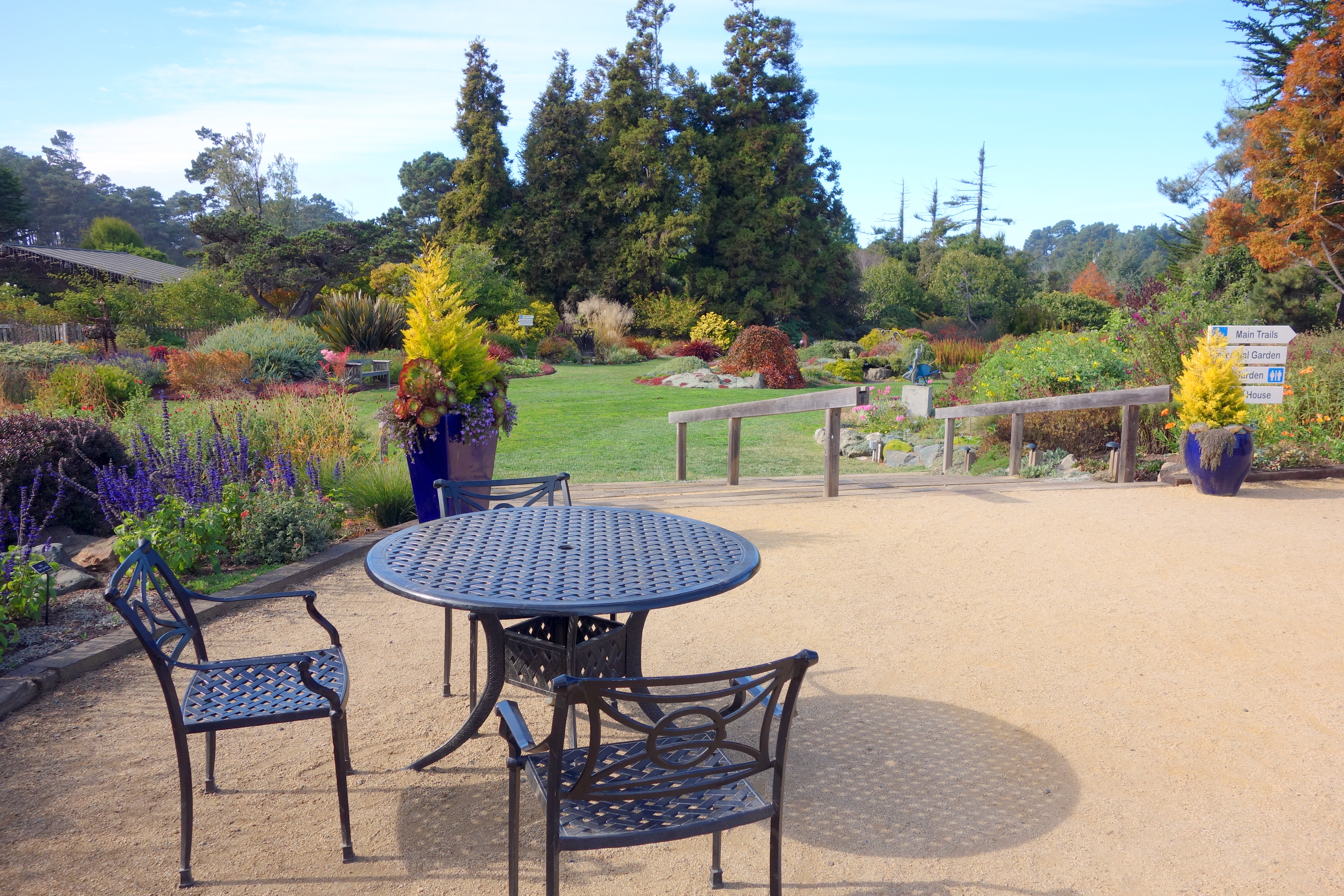
Garden terrace

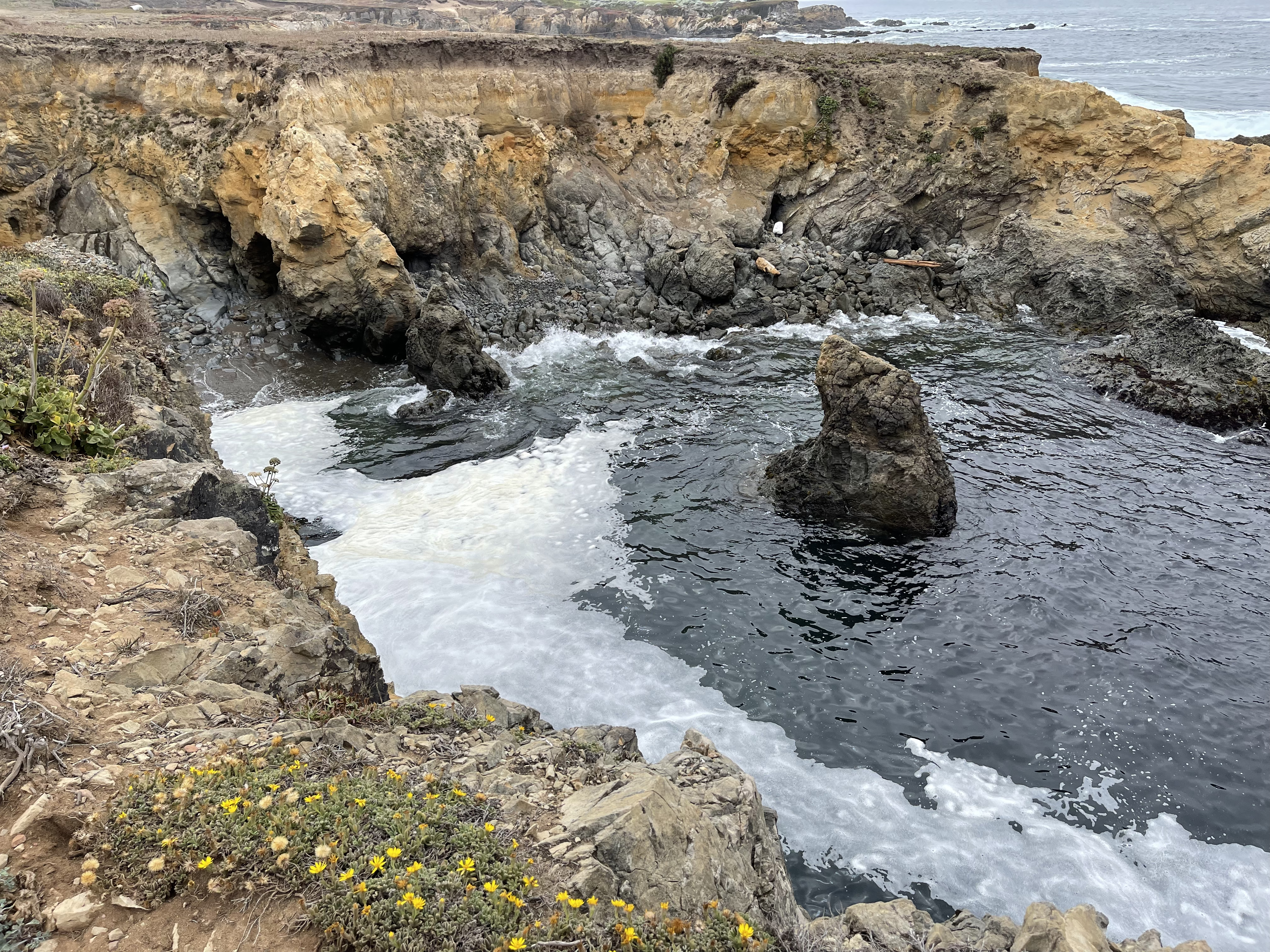
Coastal bluffs, looking south

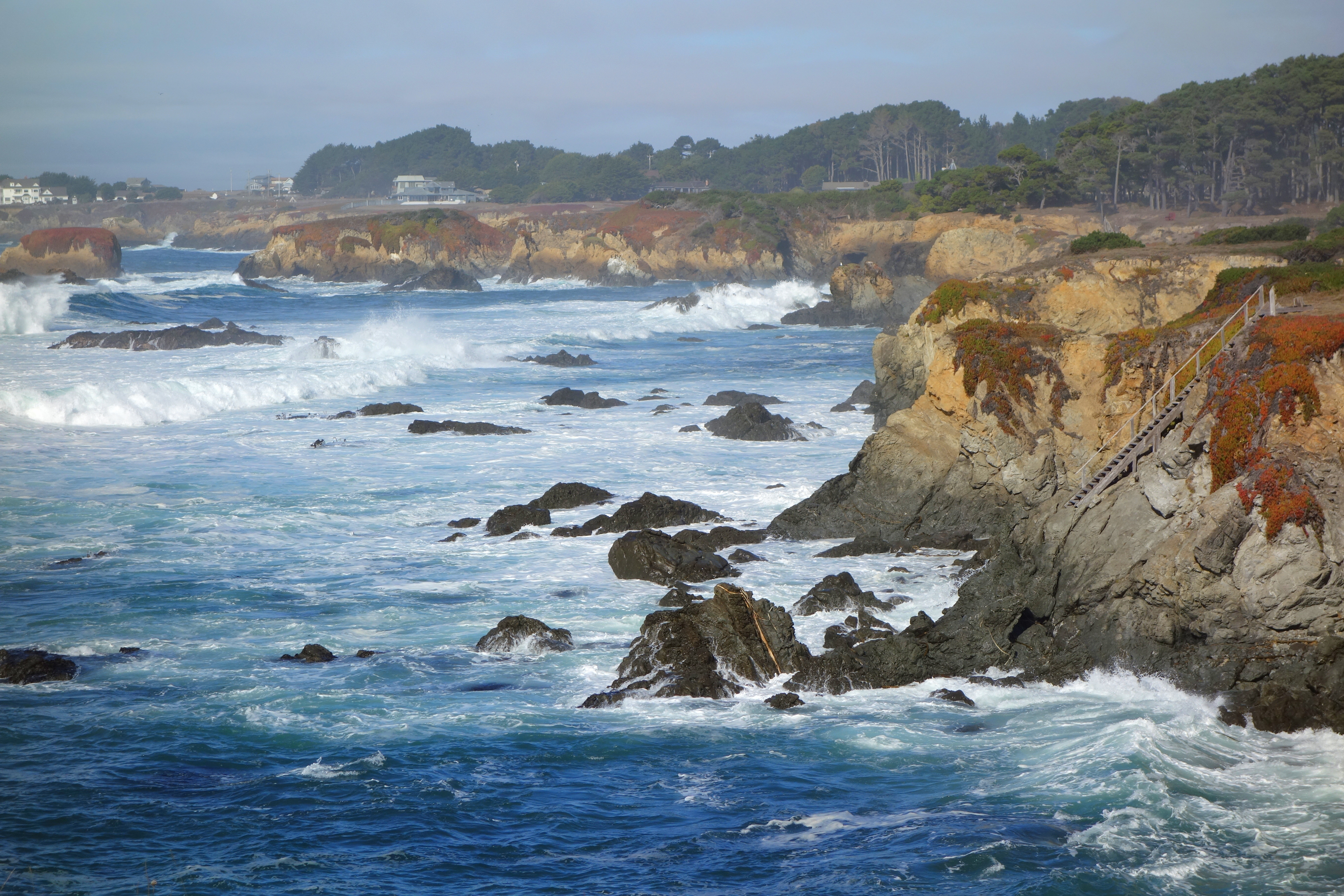
Coastline view, looking north towards Hare Creek Beach

== See also ==
- List of botanical gardens and arboretums in the United States
