= Hare Creek (California) =

Stream in Mendocino County, California

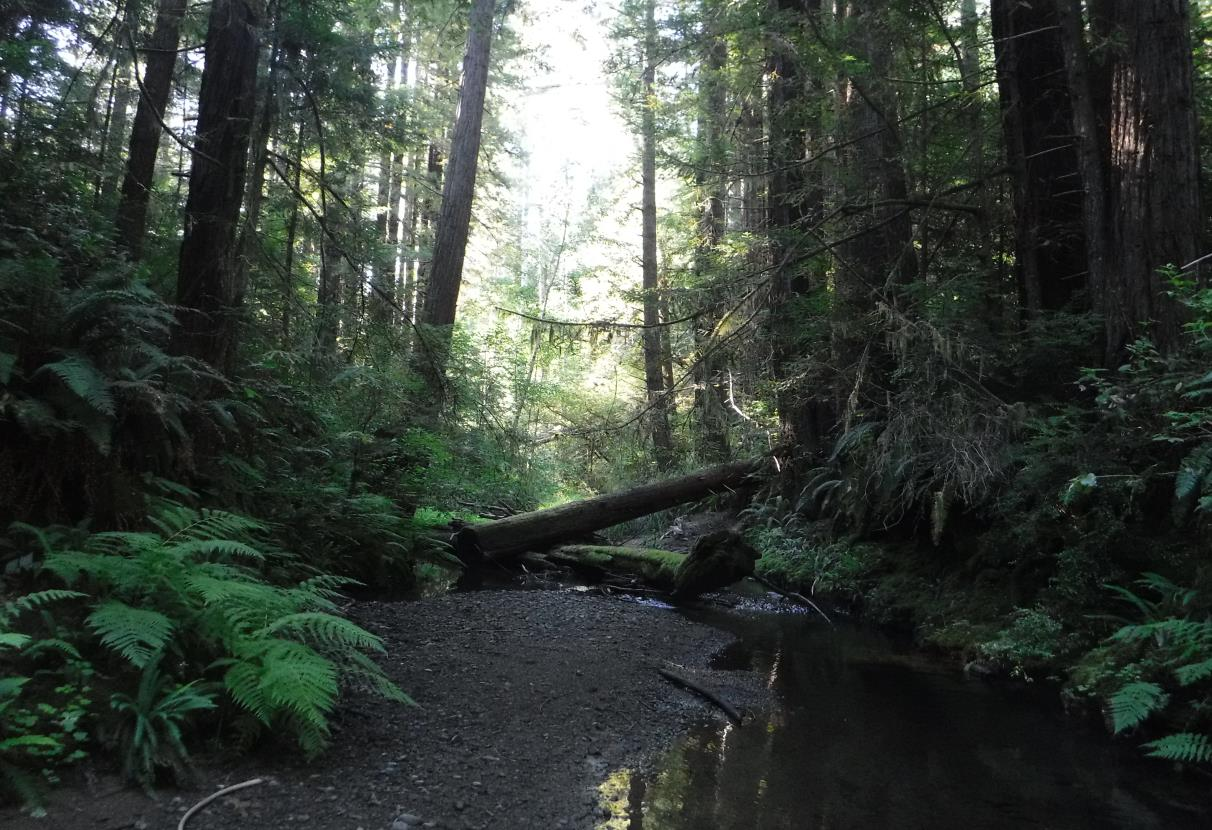

Location
- Country: United States
- State: California
- County: Mendocino
- Protected area: Jackson Demonstration State Forest

Physical characteristics
- Source: Bunker Gulch
  - coordinates: 39.3862°N 123.7274°W
  - elevation: 680 ft (210 m) above MSL
- Mouth: Pacific Ocean
  - coordinates: 39.41718°N 123.81290°W
  - elevation: Local mean sea level
- Length: 8 mi (13 km)
- Basin size: 5.2 mi^{2} (13 km^{2})
- Width
  - minimum: 3 ft (0.91 m)
  - average: 12 ft (3.7 m)
  - maximum: 30 ft (9.1 m)
- Depth
  - minimum: 0.2 ft (0.061 m)
  - average: 1 ft (0.30 m)
  - maximum: 8.5 ft (2.6 m)
- Discharge
  - location: Creek mouth
  - average: 1.5 cu ft/s (0.042 m^{3}/s)
- Discharge
  - location: Valley Road (end)
  - average: 2 cu ft/s (0.057 m^{3}/s)
- Discharge
  - location: Covington Gulch
  - average: 1 cu ft/s (0.028 m^{3}/s)

Basin features
- Tributaries
  - left: South Fork Hare Creek
  - right: Covington Creek
- Gradient: 61ft/mi (11.6m/km)

Hare Creek is a small stream in Mendocino County, California, just south of Fort Bragg. It is approximately 12.4 kilometres (7.7 mi) long and all but the final 1.14 miles (1.83 km) of its watercourse lies within Jackson Demonstration State Forest. With its four tributaries, it drains an area of approximately 2,400 hectares (9.3 mi^{2}). Its watershed is bordered on the north by the Noyo River, and on the south by Digger Creek. It is a significant habitat for coho salmon. It meets the Pacific Ocean at Hare Creek Beach, also known as Babcock Beach, which is owned and operated by the Mendocino Land Trust.

A railway line, the Caspar & Hare Creek Railroad, had formerly carried logs 6 miles (9.7 km) from Hare Creek to a sawmill on Jug Handle Creek.

The Hare Creek Bridge, also known as the Sergeant Emil H. Evensen Memorial Bridge, carries California State Route 1 over the creek, just south of its junction with the western terminus of California State Route 20. Like the Frederick W. Panhorst Bridge and the Jug Handle Bridge several miles to the south, it is a reinforced concrete open-spandrel deck arch bridge, but differs from them in having two partial side arches. It was originally built in 1947. In 2007, its substructure was rated to be in good condition, but its deck was classified as "poor". A Caltrans project, planned to begin in 2025, is set to widen the bridge, upgrade its rails, and retrofit it for seismic safety standards.

In September 2022, the Mendocino County Public Health Office issued a warning to avoid contact with the water at the creek's mouth after routine sampling discovered dangerously high levels of enterococcus bacteria.
