= Caspar, South Fork and Eastern Railroad =

Railway line in the United States of America

Overview
- Headquarters: Caspar, California
- Locale: Mendocino County, California
- Dates of operation: 1874–1945

Technical
- Track gauge: 4 ft 8 1/2 in (1,435 mm) standard gauge

The Caspar, South Fork & Eastern Railroad provided transportation for the Caspar Lumber Company in Mendocino County, California. The railroad operated the first steam locomotive on the coast of Mendocino County in 1875. Caspar Lumber Company lands became Jackson Demonstration State Forest in 1955, named for Caspar Lumber Company founder, Jacob Green Jackson.

== Early history ==
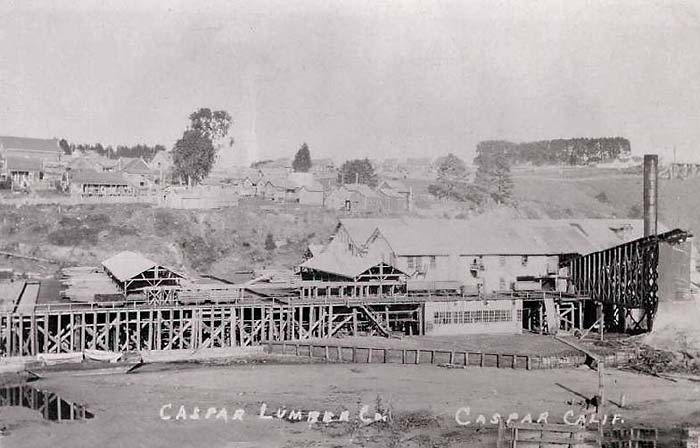
The Caspar Mill sometime in the 19th century

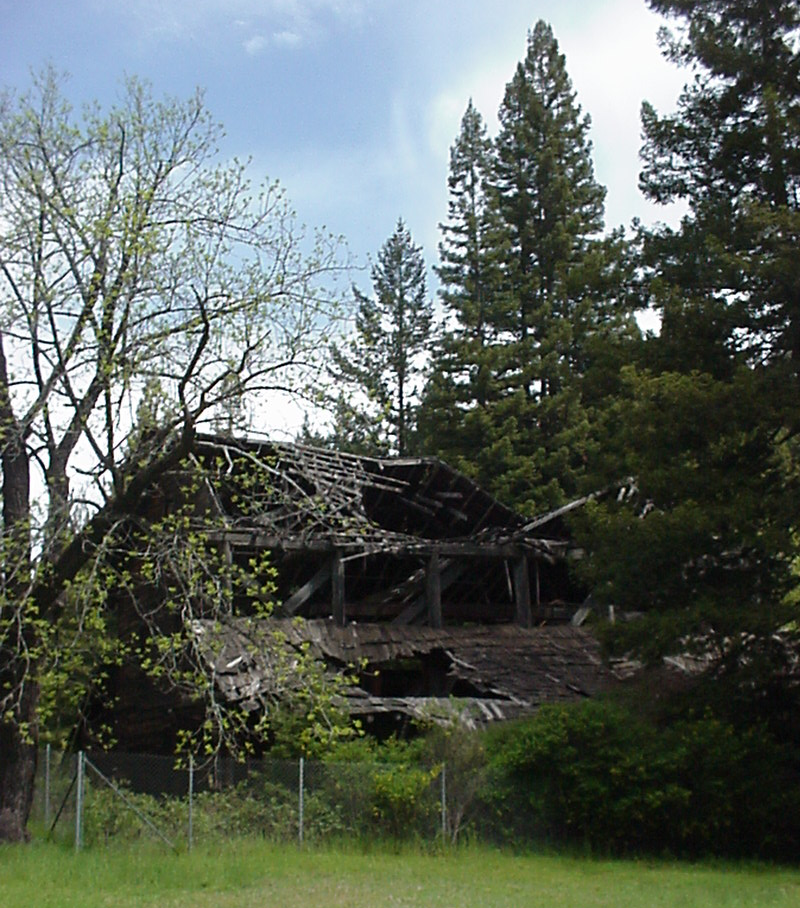
The forest reclaims the Caspar Lumber Company heavy equipment repair shop at Camp 20 - the eastern terminal of the Caspar, South Fork and Eastern Railroad.

Siegfrid Caspar settled in 1860 at the mouth of a stream on the coast of Mendocino County. The stream and the community which developed at the mouth are named for him. A sawmill was built at the mouth of Caspar Creek in 1861. In 1864 this sawmill was purchased by Jacob Jackson, who had been born in Vermont in 1817. About 1870, Jackson purchased the schooner Cora to transport lumber from his sawmill to San Francisco. A second schooner Elvenia was built in 1872. When all timber close to the sawmill had been cut, Jackson build a 1.5-mile (2.4 km) railroad north to Jug Handle Creek in 1874. This "railroad" had ties spaced at 6-foot (2-meter) intervals, and the "rails" were 6-by-8-inch (15 by 20 cm) wooden beams. Logs were transported to the sawmill from Jug Handle Creek on small cars towed by a horse and 5 mules. The wooden rails were shortly capped with iron straps to improve durability. The animal power was replaced in 1875 by a geared locomotive formerly used to transport sand fill behind the Embarcadero (San Francisco) seawall. The strap rail proved troublesome for the locomotive, and was replaced by French iron rail salvaged from a shipwreck. Two more schooners, Abbie and Maxim were purchased in 1876.

Caspar Lumber Company was incorporated in 1880. By that time the railroad had been extended to a length of 3.5 miles (5.6 km) and equipped with ten railcars available for transporting logs. Sawmill capacity was 45,000 board feet per day. A trestle was built over Jughandle Creek in 1884 to reach logs in Hare Creek to the north. The trestle was 1,000 feet (300 meters) long and rails were 160 feet (49 meters) above Jughandle Creek. During dry weather, locomotives sprayed water onto the trestles as they approached to reduce the possibility of smoldering sparks from the smokestack igniting the trestle. The 6-mile (9.7-kilometer) railway from the sawmill to Hare Creek became known as the Caspar & Hare Creek Railroad. Conventional ungeared locomotive number 2 was purchased for better efficiency on the longer rail line. The locomotive was delivered disassembled on schooners. The largest piece weighed 8 tons. The pieces were transported from San Francisco aboard the schooner Abbie in 1885 and transferred to lighters for assembly ashore. The steam schooner Caspar was built in 1888. Rails had been extended up Hare Creek for a total distance of 8 miles (13 kilometers) from the Caspar sawmill by 1890, and the logging train was making five trips per day. Larger locomotive number 3 was purchased in 1894.

Caspar Lumber Company began using steam donkeys in the early 1890s to load logs onto railway cars. The logs were typically 32 feet (9.8 meters) long and up to 12 to 14 feet (4.3 meters) in diameter. Screw jacks had previously been used to load the logs. Steam Donkeys encouraged laying some branch lines too steep for the locomotives. Cars were lowered or raised over these inclined tramways using steam donkey cables. One steam donkey could do the work of ten oxen skidding logs to railway loading points; and bull teams were replaced by steam donkeys between 1907 and 1915.

== Camp One logging headquarters ==
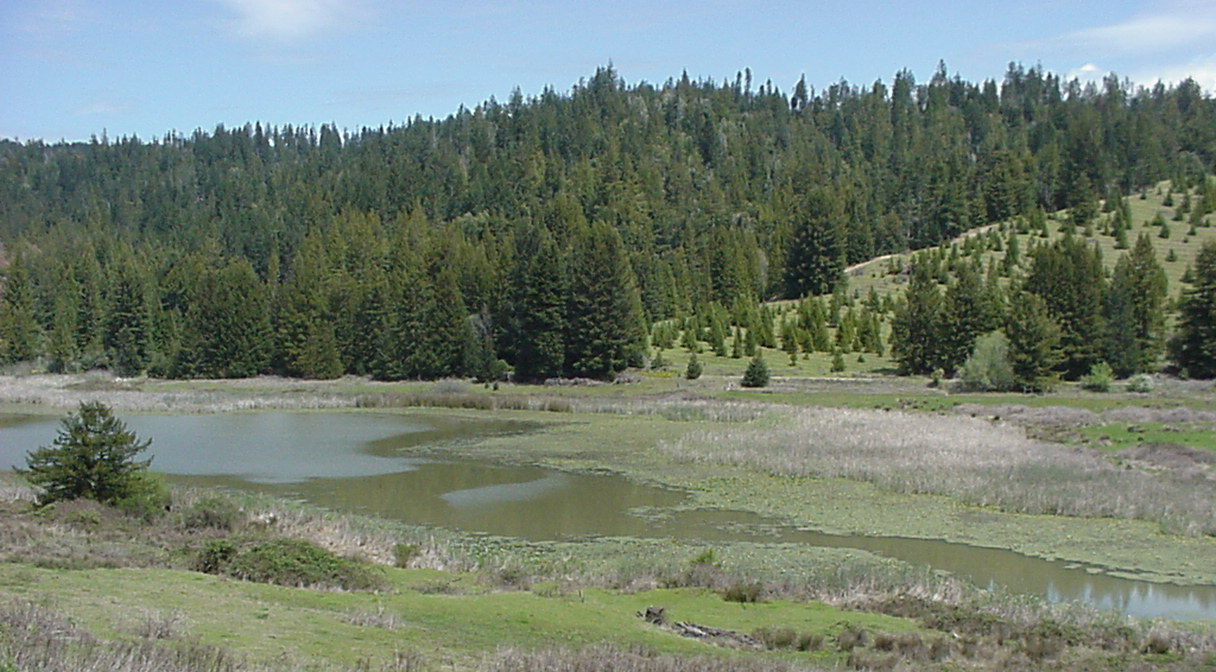
McGuire Pond as viewed from California highway 20 milepost MEN 13.5. The road on the far side of the pond is the former grade of the Caspar, South Fork and Eastern Railroad.

After the death of Jacob Jackson in 1901, his daughter, Abbie E. Krebs-Wilkins, took over as president. In the management of the business, she demonstrated ability and served as its president for more than 20 years. She carried forward the construction of 800 feet (240 m) of tunnel railroad. Under her direction, the company also owned and had in commission several steam schooners. The concern also owned and operated a large and modern lumber mill at Pittsburg, California, and owned a portion of the Mendocino Lumber Company, acquired during Krebs-Wilkins' administration.

The railroad was incorporated as the Caspar, South Fork and Eastern in 1903 with authorization to build to a connection with the Northwestern Pacific Railroad at Willits, California. A 1000-foot (300) meter tunnel to reach the South Fork Noyo River was completed in 1904 passing under the present alignment of California State Route 20 near milepost MEN 7. Camp 1 was constructed on the South Fork Noyo River in 1904; and became the headquarters of logging operations. In addition to redwood logs, carloads of tanoak tree bark were shipped to Caspar and San Francisco from the Noyo River drainage for tanning hides into leather. By 1904 the 15-mile (24 km) railroad had 4 locomotives and 58 cars. A proposed extension of the railway down the South Fork to connect with the California Western Railroad at South Fork was never completed; and the railway never reached Willits. Caspar Lumber Company acquired the Redwood Manufacturers Company plant in Pittsburg, California for seasoning and planing lumber milled at Caspar, and preferred to use its own steamships to transport lumber from Caspar to Pittsburg.

The Jughandle Creek trestle collapsed in the 1906 San Francisco earthquake and was rebuilt. The first Mallet locomotive in the Redwood Empire was delivered in 1910. Like the others, it was assembled in Caspar after arriving in pieces on ships. Wyes were constructed at Caspar and at Camp 1 to turn this large locomotive. Locomotives had previously burned wood, but Mallet number 5 had the capability to burn oil, and locomotives 2, 3 and 4 and the steam donkeys were shortly converted to burn oil. A January, 1914, storm caused a landslide closing the tunnel. The sawmill was closed until the tunnel was reopened that summer. Locomotive number 1 was retired in 1914. Shay locomotive number 6 was purchased to work on an isolated branch line on Three Chop Ridge connected to the remainder of the railway by an inclined tramway. Locomotives 2, 3 and 4 worked on branches out of Camp 1 while Mallet locomotive number 5 pulled trainloads of logs from Camp 1 to the mill at Caspar. On 19 April 1923 locomotive number 5 derailed and wrecked after hitting runaway horses on Digger Creek trestle. Locomotives 2 and 4 were damaged when the Camp 1 engine house burned two months later. The railroad had grown to a length of 30 miles when the last locomotive (Mallet number 7) was delivered in 1924.

== The shift to internal combustion ==
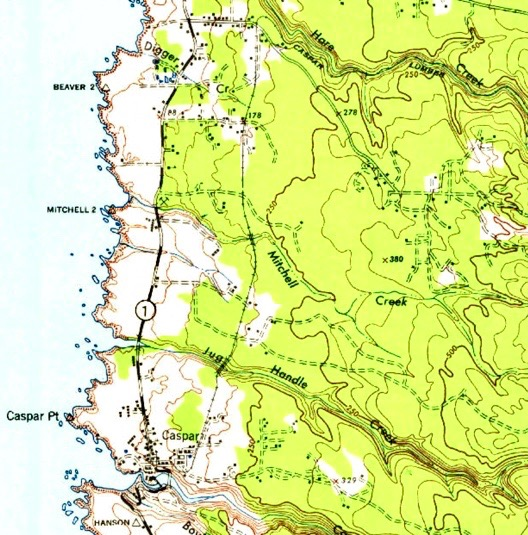
Western route with terminus at Fort Bragg in 1943

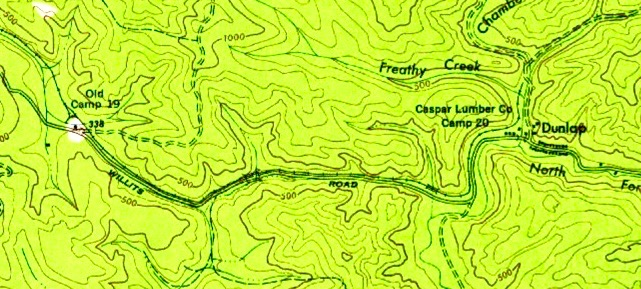
Eastern portion of route in 1943

The branch line up the North Fork of the South Fork of the Noyo River was dismantled in 1927. Caspar Lumber Company began using gasoline-powered Caterpillar tractors in 1928, and the Three Chop Ridge branch line was dismantled that year. Logging headquarters shifted from Camp 1 to Camp 19 in 1929. The Great Depression closed the sawmill from 1931 to 1934. Geared locomotives 4 and 6 were seldom used after the mill reopened as Caterpillar tractors were used in preference to building new branch lines. The last of the steam donkeys were retired when the first Diesel-powered tractors arrived in 1936. Logging headquarters shifted from Camp 19 to Camp 20 in 1939 when Caspar Lumber Company terminated steamship operations and began trucking lumber from Caspar to Pittsburg.

Hare Creek canyon was so narrow the track had been built on cribbing and trestles over the stream. Mallet locomotive number 7 derailed on one of those trestles and rolled into the creek on 30 April 1940. Locomotive number 7 had to be dismantled, and rebuilding at Caspar was not completed until late 1941. All branch lines had been dismantled by 1944. Trucks brought the logs to Camp 20, and Mallet locomotives 5 and 7 pulled trainloads of logs from Camp 20 to the mill at Caspar. The other locomotives rested unused. A labor strike closed the sawmill and railroad in December, 1945. Rail operations were not resumed when the sawmill reopened; although locomotive number 3 would be fired up once a month to move a tank car of fuel oil into the woods from Caspar through 1948. Most of old growth timber on Caspar Lumber Company lands had been cut by 1947. The sawmill operated until 18 November 1955.

Dismantling of the sawmill commenced in September 1956 and was completed within a year. Railroad equipment which had been kept in storage was largely scrapped when the mill was dismantled; although the two Mallet locomotives survived until it was determined their unsuitability for ICC interchange service made future use impractical. Caspar Lumber Company land was acquired by the State of California for Jackson State Forest. One of the locomotives was preserved for display at Camp 20. Camp 20 was the easternmost extent of the 35-mile (56 km) railroad. The locomotive was moved to the California Western Railroad depot in Fort Bragg, California after being damaged by vandalism at Camp 20. In 1978 the locomotive was moved back to the Parlin Fork Conservation Camp (on the site of Caspar Lumber Company Camp 5) for restoration. The former railroad grade may be observed where it closely parallels California State Route 20 from McGuire Pond at milepost MEN 13.5 to Camp 20 at milepost MEN 17.3.

== Locomotives ==
Number	Builder	Type	Date	Works number	Notes
1	Vulcan Iron Works	geared 0-4-0 Tank locomotive	1869	11	purchased 1875 from City Grading Company of San Francisco; originally called Jumbo, then Dirty and Greasy after the arrival of newer locomotives, officially named Pansy, unofficially the Coffeepot; retired 1914; sold 1945 for potential display at San Francisco Playland
2	Baldwin Locomotive Works	0-4-2 Tank locomotive	1885	7558	purchased new; named Daisy; new boiler 1909; preserved by California Department of Forestry and Fire Protection
3	Baldwin Locomotive Works	2-6-2 Tank locomotive	1894	13905	purchased new; named Smilax; new boiler 1926; scrapped 1956
4	Climax Locomotive Works	Climax locomotive	1903	449	purchased new as a 3-truck locomotive; 3rd truck later removed to avoid derailment problems on sharp curves; named Hercules; scrapped 1956
5	Baldwin Locomotive Works	2-6-6-2	1910	34875	purchased new; named Trojan; new boiler 1927; scrapped 1958
6	Lima Locomotive Works	Shay locomotive	1918	3017	formerly Moore Shipbuilding & Drydock #4 purchased 1919; no official name, just the Shay; retired 1930; scrapped 1956
7	Baldwin Locomotive Works	2-6-6-2	1924	57894	purchased new; named Samson; scrapped 1958

== Ships ==
Name	Builder	Type	Date	Capacity	Notes
Cora	Port Orchard, Washington	2-masted schooner	1867	155 tons	wrecked at Caspar when mooring lines parted in heavy seas 13 April 1883
Elvenia	Hans Ditlev Bendixsen, Fairhaven, California	2-masted schooner	1872	148 tons	drifted onto rocks off Caspar while becalmed 4 April 1897
Abbie	Hans Ditlev Bendixsen, Fairhaven, California	2-masted schooner	1876	146 tons	
Maxim	Hans Ditlev Bendixsen, Fairhaven, California	2-masted schooner	1876	117 tons	wrecked January 1907 at unrecorded location between San Francisco and Eureka, California
Caspar	Hanson & Frazer, San Francisco	150-hp wooden steam schooner	1888	300 tons	wrecked on Sanders Reef, Point Arena, California 22 October 1897
Jewel	Alex Hay, San Francisco	150-hp wooden steam schooner	1888	265 tons	grounded in poor visibility and wrecked at Caspar 13 January 1899
Samoa	Fulton Iron Works, San Francisco	350-hp wooden steam schooner	1898	377 tons	purchased 1902 from Beadle Steamship Company; grounded in fog and wrecked at Point Reyes 28 January 1913
South Coast	Charles G. White, San Francisco	150-hp wooden steam schooner	1887	301 tons	purchased 1903 from J.R. Hanify & Company; sold 1917 to Fyfe-Wilson Lumber Company
2nd Caspar	Lindstrom Shipbuilding, Aberdeen, Washington	450-hp wooden steam schooner	1907	648 tons	formerly Capistrano purchased 1911; sold 1930 to Alaska Salmon Company
Excelsior	Matthews, Eureka, California	366-hp wooden steam schooner	1893	526 tons	purchased about 1915; sank at San Francisco 7 February 1916 after being rammed by the passenger steamer Harvard
Lakme	Thomas Peterson, Port Madison, Washington	366-hp wooden steam schooner	1888	529 tons	purchased 1916; scrapped 1927
Nushagak	United Engineering Works, Alameda, California	700-hp steel steam schooner	1904	739 tons	purchased 1925 from Alaska Packers Association; renamed 3rd Caspar in 1930; retired 1939; wrecked in Alaska while being used by United States Army during World War II
