= Jackson Demonstration State Forest =

Protected public forest in Mendocino County, California, US

Coordinates: 39°23′33″N 123°38′56″W

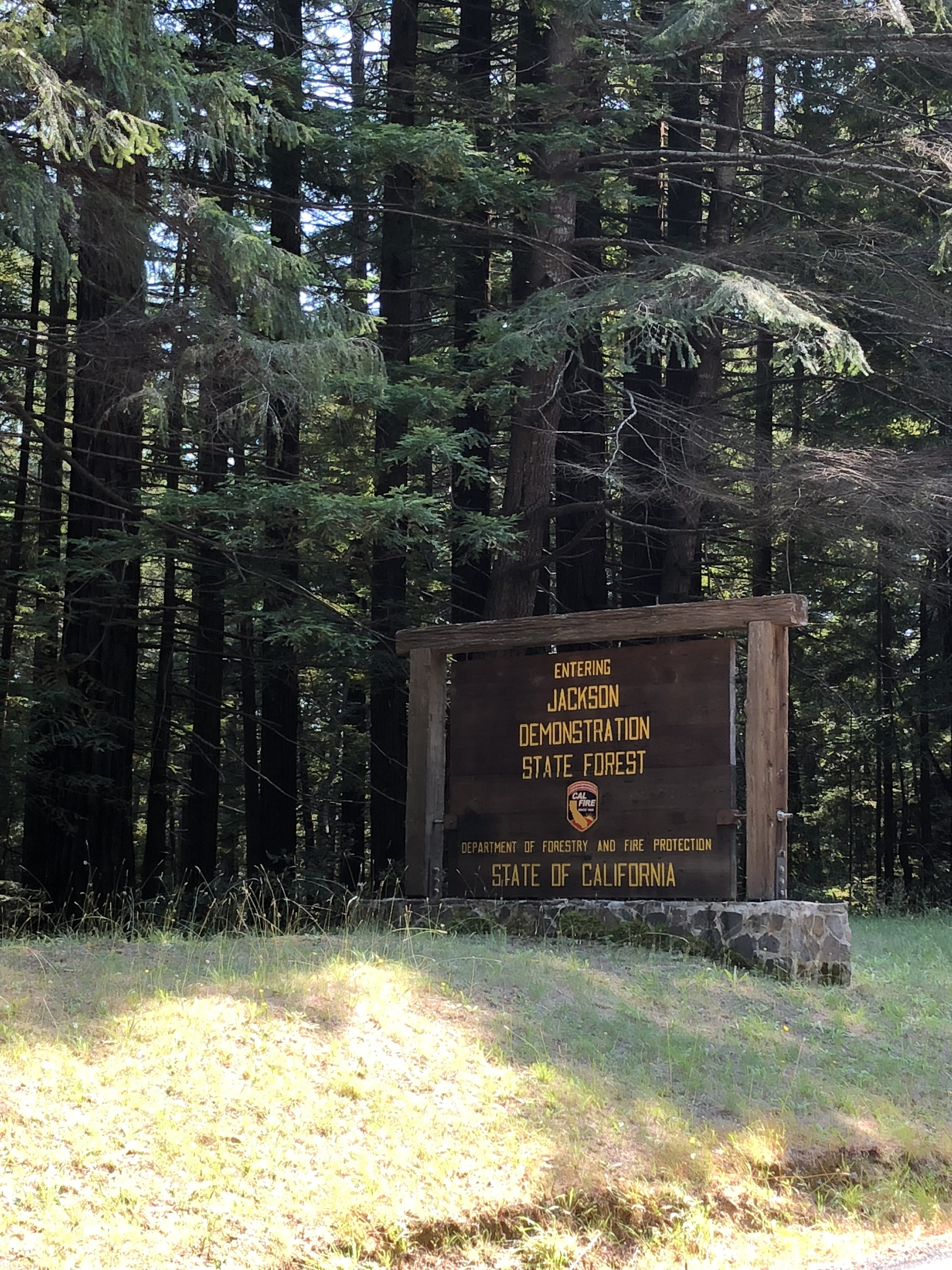
- Western entrance to Jackson Demonstration State Forest
- Interactive map of Jackson Demonstration State Forest

Geography
- Location: Mendocino County, California, USA
- Elevation: 80 feet (24 m) – 2,200 feet (670 m)
- Area: 48,652 acres (19,689 ha; 196.89 km^{2}; 76.019 mi^{2})

Administration
- Established: 1949
- Managedr: California Department of Forestry and Fire Protection

Ecology
- Dominant tree species: Coast redwood, Douglas fir, grand fir, hemlock, bishop pine, tanoak, alder, madrone, bay myrtle

Interactive map of Jackson Demonstration State Forest

Jackson Demonstration State Forest is a public forest in Mendocino County, California managed by the California Department of Forestry and Fire Protection. It is the largest demonstration forest operated by the State of California. The forest land is located along California State Highway 20 between Willits and the coastal city of Fort Bragg. It is named after Jacob Green Jackson, founder of Caspar Lumber Company, which formerly owned the land. The forest holds sacred value as an ancestral home and ceremonial site for the Coyote Valley Band of Pomo Indians.

The 197 km^{2} (76 sq mi) that make up the forest were purchased in 1947 and the demonstration forest was created in 1949. Coast redwood is the most common type of tree in the forest, but there is also Douglas fir, grand fir, hemlock, bishop pine, tanoak, alder, madrone and bay myrtle. The elevation of the land varies from 80 to 2,200 feet (24 to 671 m). Precipitation near the coast averages 39 inches (990 mm) per year, but the average is 70 inches (1,800 mm) per year inland. The temperature reaches a low of 25 °F (−4 °C) and a high of 100 °F (38 °C).

Logging of the area began in 1862, and intense industrial logging has taken place for many decades. There have been several generations of harvests and replantings. The Caspar 500 timber harvest plan sparked opposition around 2020 as it included some very large redwood trees in a 533-acre area (216 ha; 2.16 km^{2}) near the coastal community of Caspar. The area, heavily used for hiking and mountain biking, is closer to residential areas and public access roads than more remote areas that have been logged in the past.
