= Caspar Headlands State Beach =

California State Beach

- Location within California Location within the United States
- Location: Mendocino County, California, United States
- Nearest city: Caspar, California
- Coordinates: 39°21′40″N 123°49′25″W
- Area: 75 acres (30 ha)
- Established: 1972
- Governing body: California Department of Parks and Recreation

Caspar Headlands State Beach is a protected beach in the state park system of California, United States. It is located in Northern California in Mendocino County near the village of Caspar. The 75-acre (30 ha) park was established in 1972.

== History ==
In the early part of the twentieth century, the area was used for logging. The logging operations ceased in 1955. In March 1939 after the completion of the Golden Gate Bridge, the area of California north of the Golden Gate was open to exploration by automobile. Prior to that time, roads into the area were crude or non-existent.

In 1997 the main landowner in Caspar announced that he would be selling approximately 300 acres (120 ha) of the village of Caspar, including part of the beach. In late 1998, the citizens of the village of Caspar persuaded the Trust for Public Land, based out of San Francisco, to protect the land. The Mendocino Land Trust acquired the adjoining beach in 1999. In 2000 the village of Caspar and the Mendocino Land Trust used a grant from the California State Coastal Conservancy as well as state and federal funds to purchase the Caspar Headlands. The Mendocino Land Trust managed the land until the California Department of Parks and Recreation assumed ownership in June 2002. State Senator Wesley Chesbro was present at the opening ceremony.

A hiking trail, part of the California Coastal Trail, was established in 2011 and connects the beach to the Point Cabrillo Light one mile to the south.

== Recreational uses ==
The beach is popular for swimming, boating, hiking, and fishing. This area has miles of undeveloped beach adjacent to the headlands. It is also a popular place to watch migrating gray whales.

== Animal and plant life ==
The area is home to many different types of marine life, birds, as well as many different species of trees and wildflowers. Some types of animal life are: Coho salmon, steelhead trout, osprey, and shorebirds.

== See also ==
- List of beaches in California
- List of California state parks
- Mendocino Headlands State Park
