= Jacob Green Jackson =

American lumberman (1817–1901)

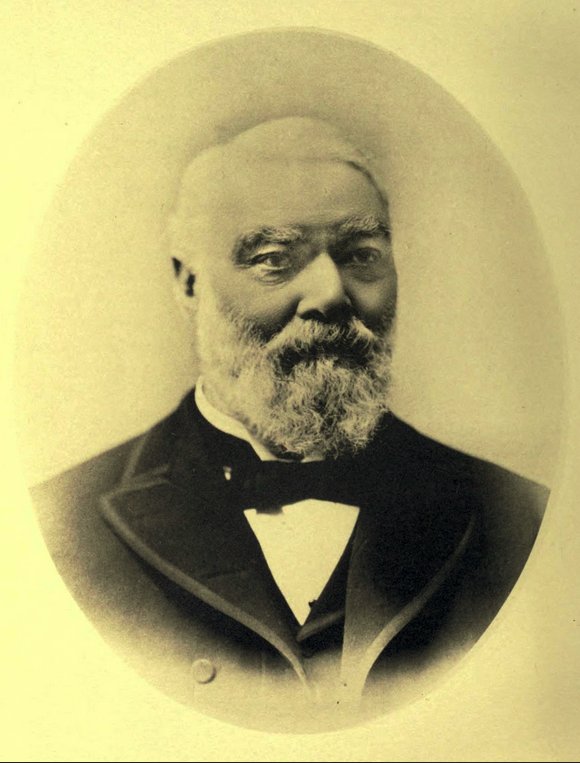
American Lumbermen (1906)

Jacob Green Jackson (March 16, 1817 – April 17, 1901) was an American lumberman of Colonial New England ancestry who came to California in 1851. He was one of the first to recognize the vast wealth in the redwood forests and was among the earliest to make a successful business of logging. Jackson founded Caspar Lumber Company in Mendocino County. Jackson Demonstration State Forest is named in his honor.

== Early life ==
Jacob G. Jackson was born March 16, 1817, in East St. Johnsbury, Vermont, and came of Revolutionary ancestry. His father was Elijah Jackson, and his grandfather, Samuel Jackson, fought at the Battle of Bunker Hill. His father lived to be 96 years of age, and Jacob died at a younger age than any of his brothers. His people were farmers, but by the early death of his mother, he was sent to live with an aunt in Maine, where he received some schooling.

== Career ==
As a teenager, Jackson moved to Providence, Rhode Island, where his brother, Samuel Randall Jackson, was engaged in the coal and shipping business. At the age of 16, he was in charge of the transportation end of the business. He was subsequently admitted to partnership in the concern and advanced to the position of agent, buyer, and shipper of coal between Philadelphia and Providence.

Later, he attempted to manufacture rubber products in Salem, Massachusetts. After losing his plant by fire, he disposed of his patents and the secrets of his process of manufacture to the Goodyear Rubber Company.

=== California ===
In 1851, Jackson, coming to California via the Isthmus of Panama, became associated with Asa Meade Simpson in the lumber trade at San Francisco, Sacramento, and Stockton. He made one voyage to Australia, with a load of lumber, and the vessel's captain dying en route, Jackson assumed command of the vessel, continuing in charge of the return voyage to San Francisco. In this connection, he gained the title of captain, by which he was thereafter familiarly known. At the time of the mining excitement in the Fraser River district of British Columbia, Captain Jackson transported to that district a cargo of lumber, and there he continued in business for a time.

His brother, Samuel Jackson, had preceded him to the Pacific Coast, and when Jacob Jackson arrived in California, intending to go into another business, he found that his brother, who had engaged in the lumber and shipping business with Asa Mead Simpson, of Maine, had been on a vessel which was wrecked along the northern coast, and was supposed to have lost his life. So Jacob Jackson took his brother's place in the business, and the firm remained Simpson & Jackson. Although Samuel Jackson subsequently returned alive, he soon left for his old home in the East and Jacob Jackson continued in the lumber business with Simpson.

Jackson sailed to Australia with a cargo of lumber on one of the firm's vessels. After losing the master there, Jackson sailed the vessel back to San Francisco in command. He thus acquired the title of captain, which was thereafter accorded him through life. He also shipped a cargo to British Columbia during the mining excitement on the Fraser River in the early days and there remained in business for a time.

In 1861, he severed his partnership with Simpson. With Messrs. Kelly and Rundell, Jackson engaged in the manufacturing of lumber in Mendocino County, California, north of San Francisco, on Caspar Creek. A few months after this enterprise was inaugurated, he bought the interests of his associates.

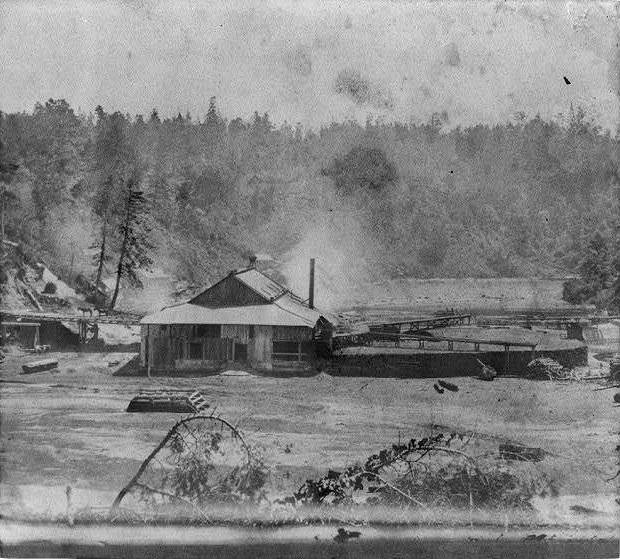
Caspar Lumber Company (Casper, California, 1866)

In 1862, under the title of the Caspar Lumber Company, Jackson developed a large and prosperous business in the manufacturing of redwood lumber, his sawmill plant having been established at the mouth of Caspar Creek. He continued as the principal owner of this business, with an office in San Francisco, until the time of his death, the mill having an output capacity of 100,000 feet (30,000 m) of lumber daily, and the company having 80,000 acres (32,000 ha) of redwood timberland, besides operating in connection with the industry the Caspar, South Fork and Eastern Railroad, 15 miles (24 km) in length. In November 1881, the company was incorporated with a capitalization of US$400,000, but Captain Jackson continued as almost the sole owner until his death.

== Personal life ==
In 1840, while a resident of Providence, Captain Jackson married Elvenia D. Durgin, of Sanbornton Bridge (now Tilton, New Hampshire), and she was 91 years of age at the time of her death, in 1919. Of the two children, Abbie E. Krebs-Wilkins is the elder, and the son, Charles G., died in 1890.

== Death and legacy ==
Jacob Green Jackson died in San Francisco, on April 17, 1901. Soon after the death of Captain Jackson, his daughter, Abbie E. Krebs-Wilkins, became president of the company. Jackson Demonstration State Forest is named in his honor.
