= Abbie E. Krebs-Wilkins =

American businesswoman and philanthropist

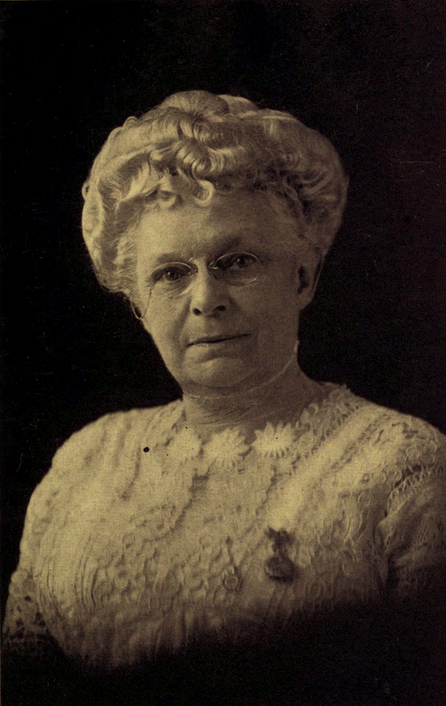
- Portrait photo from Problems Women Solved (1915)
- Born: Abigail Elvenia Jackson; March 24, 1842; Providence, Rhode Island, U.S.
- Died: July 30, 1924 (aged 82); San Mateo, California, U.S.
- Occupation: businesswoman
- Known for: President, Caspar Lumber Company
- Notable work: La Cope de Orc
- Spouses: James DeCamp; William Wood; Henry Krebs, Jr.; James E. Wilkins

Signature
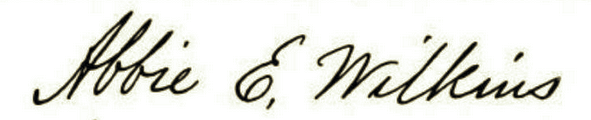

Abigail Elvenia Krebs-Wilkins (née, Jackson; after first marriage, DeCamp; after second marriage, Wood; after third marriage, Krebs; after fourth marriage, Wilkins; 1842–1924) was an American businesswoman. Arriving in California as a young child, she contributed to the success of business, personal, literary, and political affairs in San Francisco. After the death of her father, Capt. Jacob Green Jackson, Krebs-Wilkins became the president and active manager of Caspar Lumber Company, in Mendocino County. She also served as president of the Pacific Coast Women's Press Association. Krebs-Wilkins was actively affiliated with the Order of the Eastern Star for more than half a century. A wealthy woman, she was a patron of the arts and a philanthropist.

== Early life and education ==
Abigail Elvenia Jackson was born in Providence, Rhode Island, on March 24, 1842. She was the only daughter of Capt. Jacob Green Jackson, and former wife of Henry Krebs; both gentlemen were notable citizens of San Francisco.

As a young child, with her mother, Abbie came around Cape Horn, landing in San Francisco, at the corner of Montgomery and Washington streets, where she joined her father, Jacob G. Jackson, who had come two years earlier.

Later, she returned East and graduated from a young ladies' seminary, an adjunct to Brown University, Providence, Rhode Island.

== Career ==
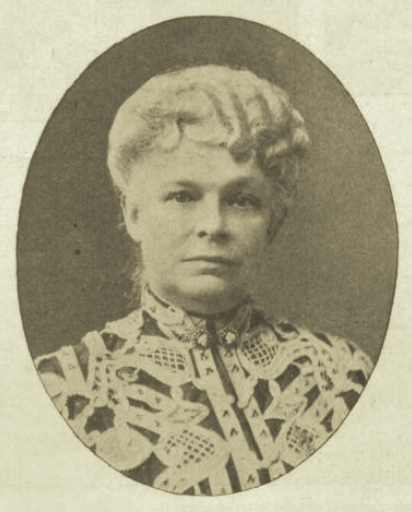
American Lumberman (1904)

On her return to California, she became the confident and business companion of her father. The experience was destined to serve her well when, following his death, she inherited his business, the Caspar Lumber Company, in Mendocino County, with an office in San Francisco. Those first years were discouraging and difficult as the volume was small, credit poor, prices low, and competition keen. It was, moreover, a new and difficult field for a woman.

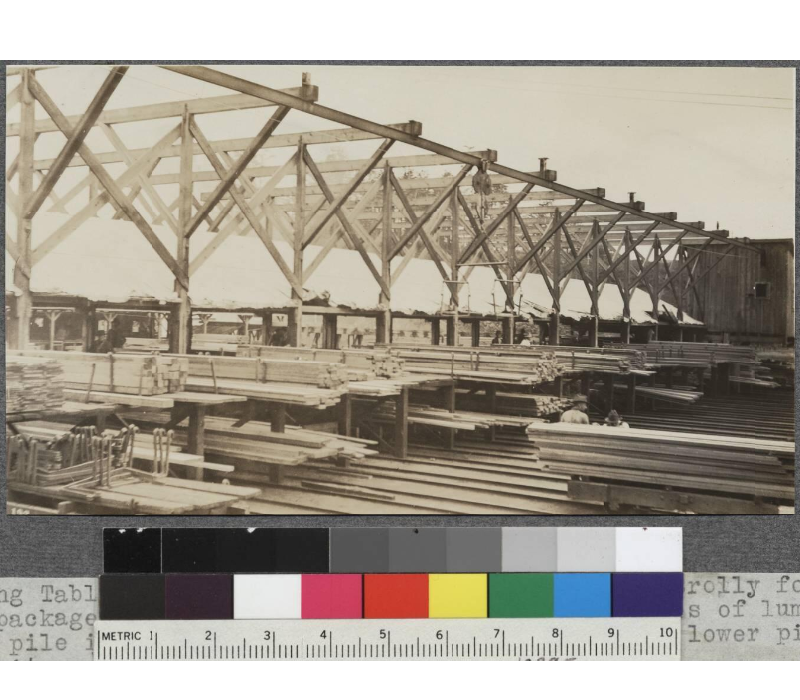
Sorting table of Caspar Lumber Company (1920)

In the management of the business, she demonstrated ability and served as its president for more than 20 years. Under her administration was constructed the railway line used by the company, and she carried forward the construction of 800 feet (240 m) of tunnel railroad, the line being known as the Caspar, South Fork & Eastern Railroad. Under the direction of Krebs-Wilkins, the company also owned and had in commission several steam schooners. The concern also owned and operated a large and modern lumber mill at Pittsburg Contra Costa County. The company owned some of the Mendocino Lumber Company, acquired during Krebs-Wilkins' administration. She was one of the heaviest stockholders in the Caspar Lumber Company.

She assisted in many constructive movements to improve the trade, being associated with other California lumber operators in creating a market in the Eastern states for the excess supply of redwood. She added to the timber reserve of her company and opened up new tracts of timber through extensive railroad extensions. She also attended most of the trade meetings, being the only woman present. In 1903, she was selected by the Redwood operators to represent them at the exposition in St. Louis.

Wilkins was widely known as a writer, lecturer, business director, and public-spirited woman. She was twice president of the Pacific Coast Press Women's Association, one of the founders of the California Club, senior regent of the Puerta del Oro chapter of the Daughters of the American Revolution, national secretary of the Ladies of the Grand Army of the Republic, grand matron of the Eastern Star in California, and director of the women's board of the Panama-Pacific International Exposition.

Krebs-Wilkins was actively affiliated with the Order of the Eastern Star for more than half a century. She was elected grand secretary of the Grand Chapter of California in 1875, and continued in office for the next seven years. In 1885, she was elected grand matron, and from then, with few exceptions, was a regular attendant at the Grand Chapter sessions. She also served as matron in her home city, San Francisco, of California Chapter No. 4, Aloha Chapter No. 206, and Casimir Chapter No. 252. She regarded the Eastern Star as the forerunner of women's clubs in California, in many of which she was an active member, whether of social, literary, political, or civic nature.

Members of the Masonic order generally in the West were familiar with her name and service. The Masonic, World published serially a history of the Eastern Star in California, of which Krebs-Wilkins was the author.

She was a member of the Pen Women of America, and the Pacific Coast Women's Press Association, of which she was president two terms.

Because of her long experience in business and social organizations, Krebs-Wilkins was fully qualified for participation in that new department of women's work opened by suffrage. The national Republican Party in 1916 for the first time, accorded women the distinction of places as delegates at the national convention, and Krebs-Wilkins was one of the few elected as delegate to the national convention of that year, when Justice Hughes was nominated. During the convention, Krebs-Wilkins was paid many marks of honor by the delegates and the press. She was president of the Taft Club in San Francisco, served on the Republican County Central Committee, and was in charge of the women's department during the campaign.

Krebs-Wilkins, under the administration of Mayor Ralph, was a member of the City Planning Commission for five years, and in gathering plans and information that would assist the commission in its work, she visited seven cities in seven different states.

== Personal life ==
In 1859, she married James F. DeCamp (1836–1888). They had one child, Clarence Eastman DeCamp (b. 1859). They divorced by 1867.

Krebs-Wilkins relocated later in life to Southern California.

For the last ten years of her life, Krebs-Wilkins was not actively engaged in the Caspar Lumber Company management, her two sons, C. J. Wood and C. E. DeCamp, having been at the head of the company since her retirement.

On July 10, 1917, she married James E. Wilkins, who for many years was an official of the Postoffice and Treasury departments in Washington. They purchased a new home in St. Francis Wood, San Francisco and she returned to San Francisco.

Abbie E. Krebs-Wilkins died at her home in San Mateo, California, on July 30, 1924, aged 82 years.

== Selected works ==
=== Editor ===
- La Cope de Orc (the Cup of Gold); a Collection of California Poems, Sketches and Stories by the Members of the Pacific Coast Women's Press Association (1905) (text)
