= American Conifer Society =

US non-profit organization

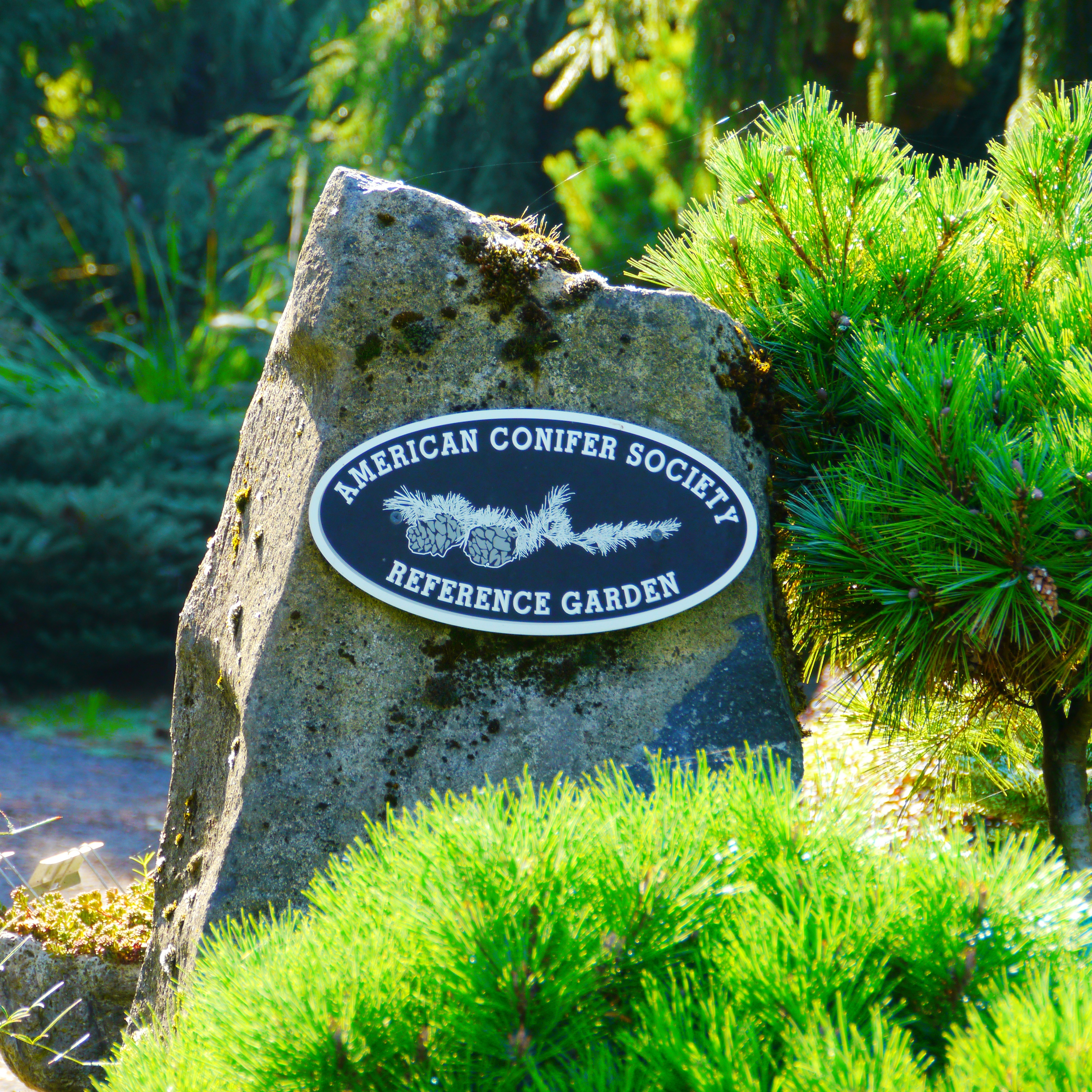
- Abbreviation: ACS
- Formation: 1983
- Purpose: Education
- Website: Official website

The American Conifer Society was founded in 1983 to help educate the public about conifers, which are cone-bearing plants. The Society is governed by a board of directors with representation from each of the Society's four regions. The Society publishes the ConiferQuarterly in both digital and hard copy versions and maintains a public website which hosts an extensive conifer database as well as copious articles about identifying, growing and designing with conifers. In addition, the Society holds annual events, including small, informal gatherings and a national meeting, which is rotated among the four regions.

The Society also partners with public gardens to help collect plant materials and build conifer collections.

== Education ==
The Society shares knowledge about conifers as well as encourages discovery of new and exiting cultivars. To help foster stewardship, conservation and education, the Society makes grants and scholarship awards annually. The Jean Iseli Memorial Grant provides a $4,000 annual grant to a public garden or arboretum that has demonstrated its support of the development, conservation and propagation of conifers. The Society makes annual Reference Garden Grants to assist with development of conifer collections and has begun making Conservation and Research Grants. The Society also grants one or more scholarships annually of up to $10,000. These scholarships may be both undergraduate and graduate.

With thousands of records, the Society's conifer database is one of the most comprehensive plant databases on the Internet. Entries include accurate scientific nomenclature, description of native habitats, detailed descriptions of morphology and, for cultivars, provenance (when known). The public is invited to submit photos and to comment, which the editors review and may incorporate into the records.

== Conifer sizes ==
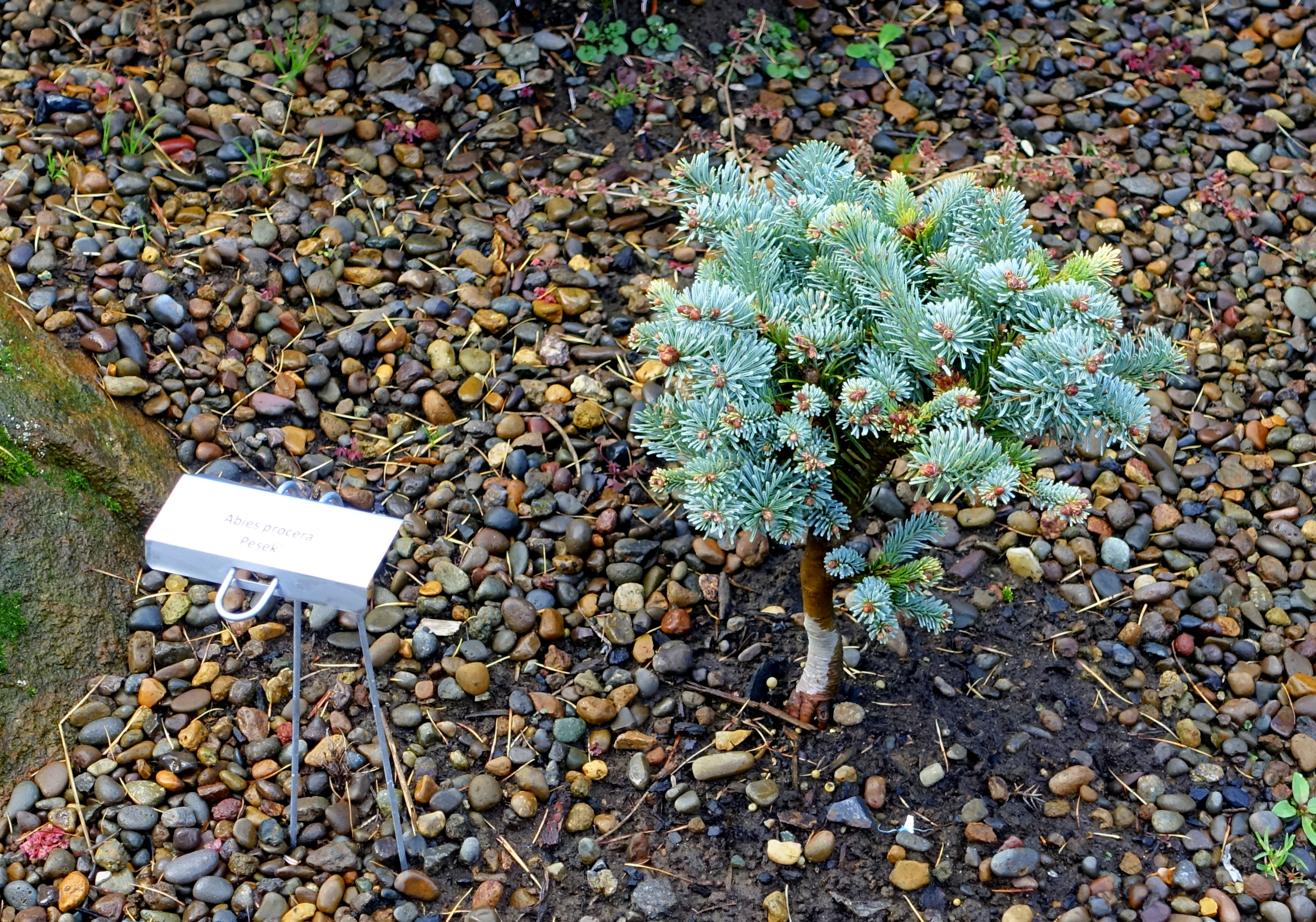
A conifer is categorized by the growth rate.

The Society has designated four categories of conifer sizes, based on growth rates:

Growth Type	Yearly Growth	Growth at 10 years
Miniature	Less Than 1 Inch	1 foot
Dwarf	1 - 6 Inches	1 - 6 Feet
Intermediate	6 - 12 Inches	6 to 15 feet
Large	Greater than 12 inches	More than 15 feet

== Reference gardens ==
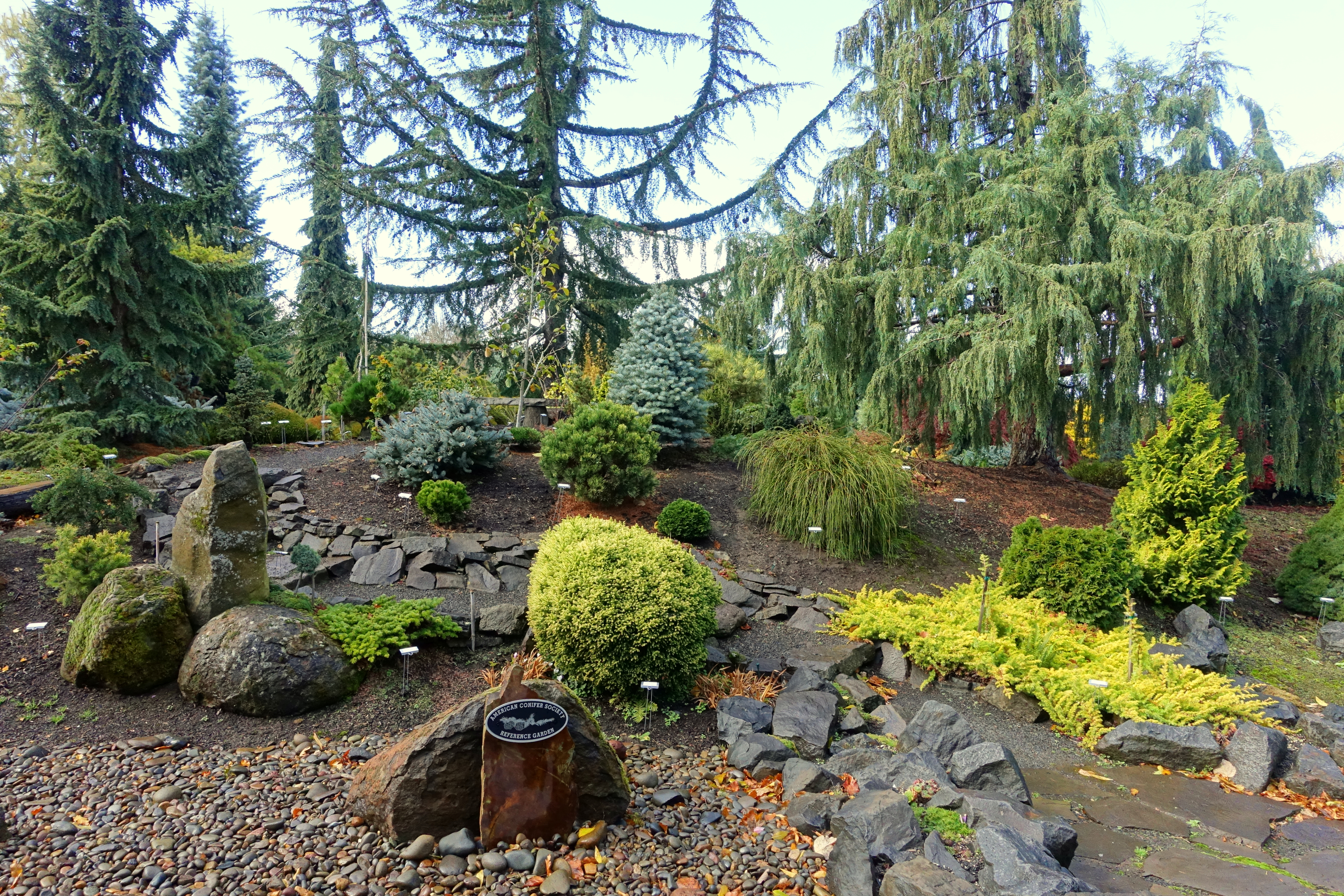
An example of a reference garden.

The American Conifer Society has established a select group of public gardens, designated as "reference gardens". To be considered for this program, a garden must follow the following standards:

- Contain conifer collections that will educate the public about growing conifers and demonstrate their uses in the landscape
- Introduce gardeners to new varieties of conifers that are appropriate to grow in their area
- Be open to the public and contain a minimum number of conifer species
- Accurately label and properly maintain their conifer collections

The reference gardens may be either existing gardens or new gardens that are built in partnership with the American Conifer Society. The reference garden program includes, among many others, Hidden Lake Gardens, the Wellesley College Botanic Gardens and the JC Raulston Arboretum.
