= Caspar, California =

Caspar
- Unincorporated community Census-designated place
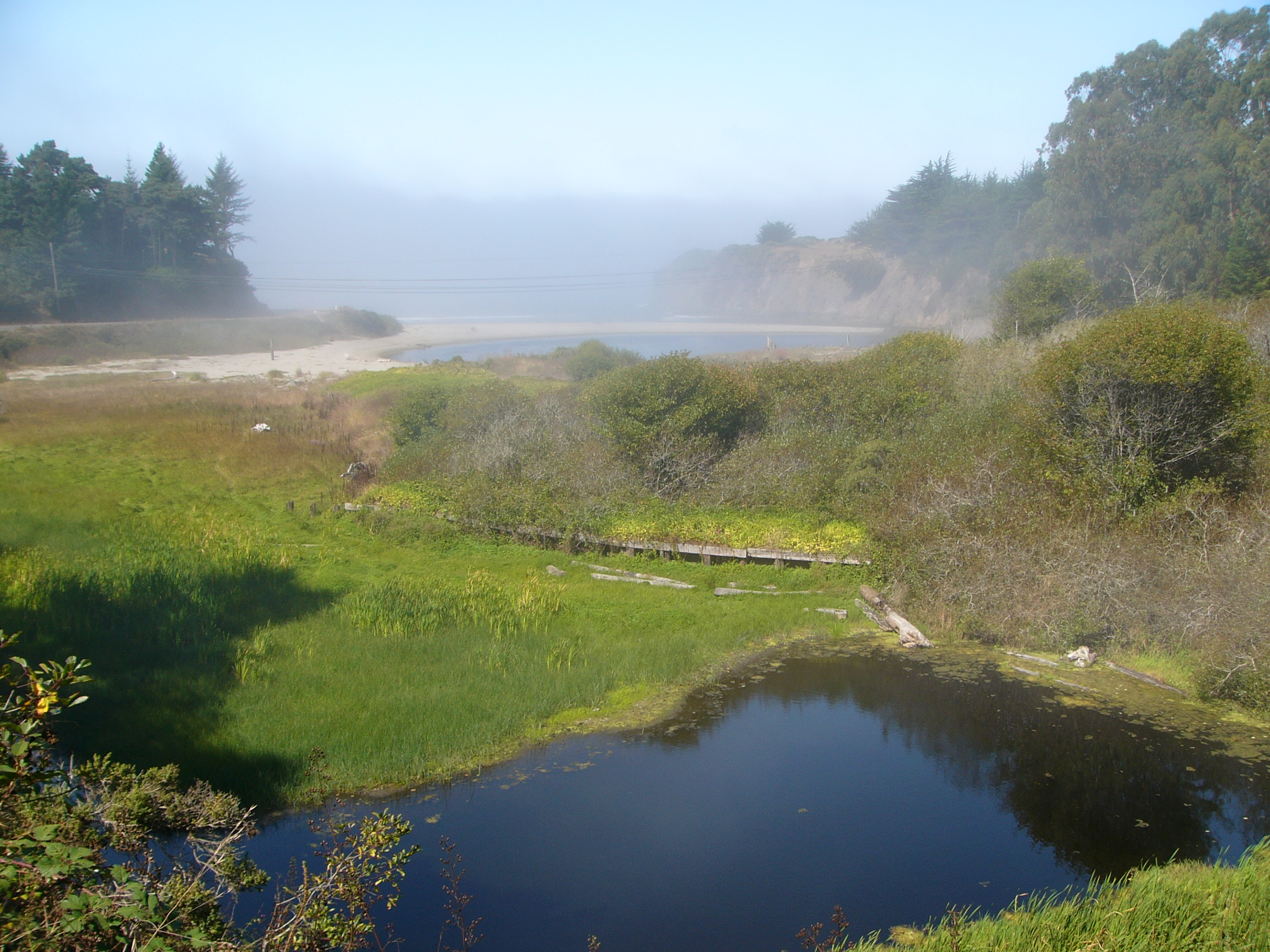
- Former mill site in Caspar

- Location in Mendocino County and California

- Location within California Location within the United States
- Coordinates: 39°21′49″N 123°48′57″W
- Country: United States
- State: California
- County: Mendocino

Area
  - Total: 2.99 sq mi (7.7 km^{2})
  - Land: 2.99 sq mi (7.7 km^{2})
  - Water: 0.00 sq mi (0 km^{2}) 0%
- Elevation: 82 ft (25 m)

Population (2020)
  - Total: 500
  - Density: 167.11/sq mi (64.52/km^{2})
- Time zone: UTC-8 (PST)
  - Summer (DST): UTC-7 (PDT)
- ZIP code: 95420
- Area code: 707
- GNIS feature IDs: 1658232; 2628717

Caspar is an unincorporated community in Mendocino County, California, United States. It is located on the Pacific Ocean, 4 miles (6 km) north of Mendocino, at an elevation of 82 feet (25 m). It is bounded on three sides by state parks: the historic 1909 Point Cabrillo Light Station is nearby to the south, Jug Handle State Natural Reserve lies to the north, and its coast forms Caspar Headlands State Beach. The population was 500 at the 2020 census. For statistical purposes, the United States Census Bureau has defined Caspar as a census-designated place (CDP).

== History ==
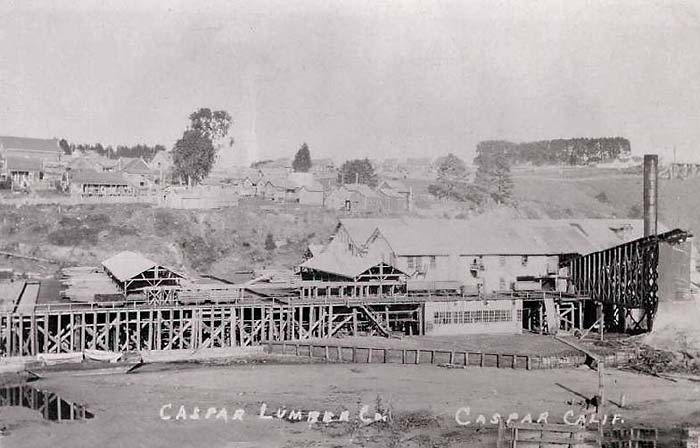
The Caspar Mill sometime in the 19th century

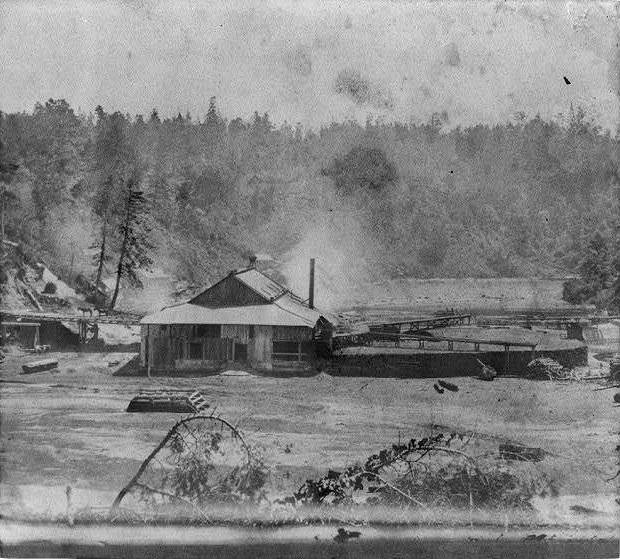
The Caspar Mill, 1866

Caspar was settled in 1857 by Siegfried Caspar, who later sold the land to Jacob Green Jackson, one of the founders of the Caspar Lumber Company, which turned Caspar into a significant logging town in Northern California from 1864 to 1955. Pilings from the mill can be seen on Caspar Beach south of the community. The mill was featured on the cover of a 1938 National Geographic magazine.

Multiple heirs to the Caspar Lumber Company sold their holdings to Georgia-Pacific and a pair of private investors in 1989. Ownership of the central parcels, consisting of more than 300 acres (120 ha) and comprising much of "downtown Caspar", was taken over by the Caspar Cattle Company in 1997. The company's principal immediately offered the land for sale. This offer was facilitated by a professor and team of graduate student community planners from the University of California, Berkeley. The process early on committed to consensus and inclusive self-governance, and identified several sacred spaces, principal among them the headlands, once the site of the Caspar Lumber Company's mill, and managed the acquisition of the 30-acre (12 ha) headlands parcel in partnership with the Trust for Public Land and the Mendocino Land Trust, which acquired the adjoining beach in 1999. Funded by a California State Coastal Conservancy grant in May 2000, as well as state and federal funds, the headlands were transferred to California State Parks and designated as Caspar Headlands State Reserve in June 2002.

The Caspar Schoolhouse, built in the late 1800s during Caspar's heyday, and expanded during the boom years after 1906, served as a Headstart school and a mail-order company office, then remained empty until it was sold by the Cattle Company to Caspar Community, Inc., the nonprofit entity that organized the community's campaign to preserve its sacred spaces. CCI continues to attempt to acquire the remainder of the property in accordance with the vision of the community since its formation. As of July 2013, the majority of the land is still for sale.

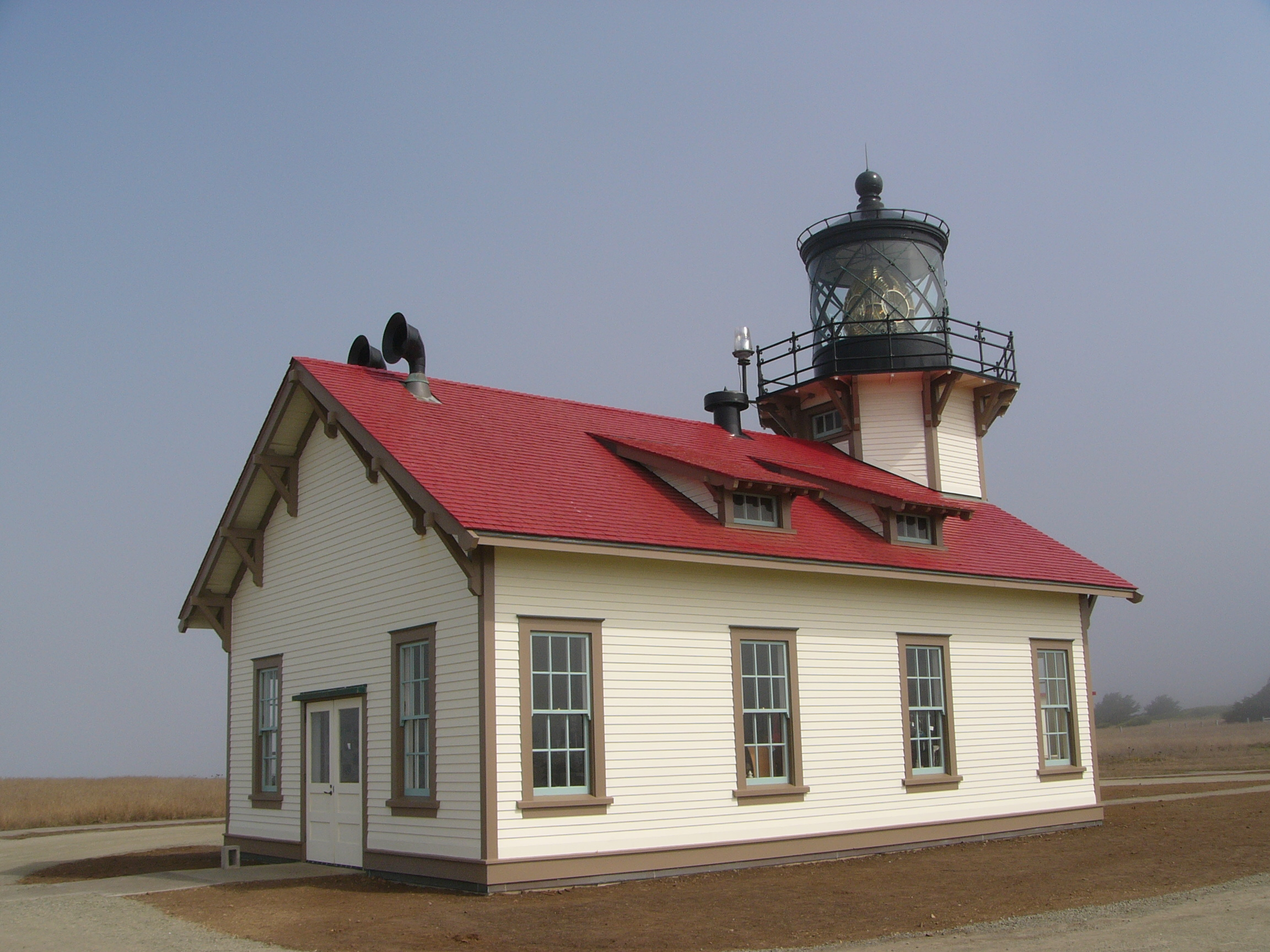
Point Cabrillo Light Station

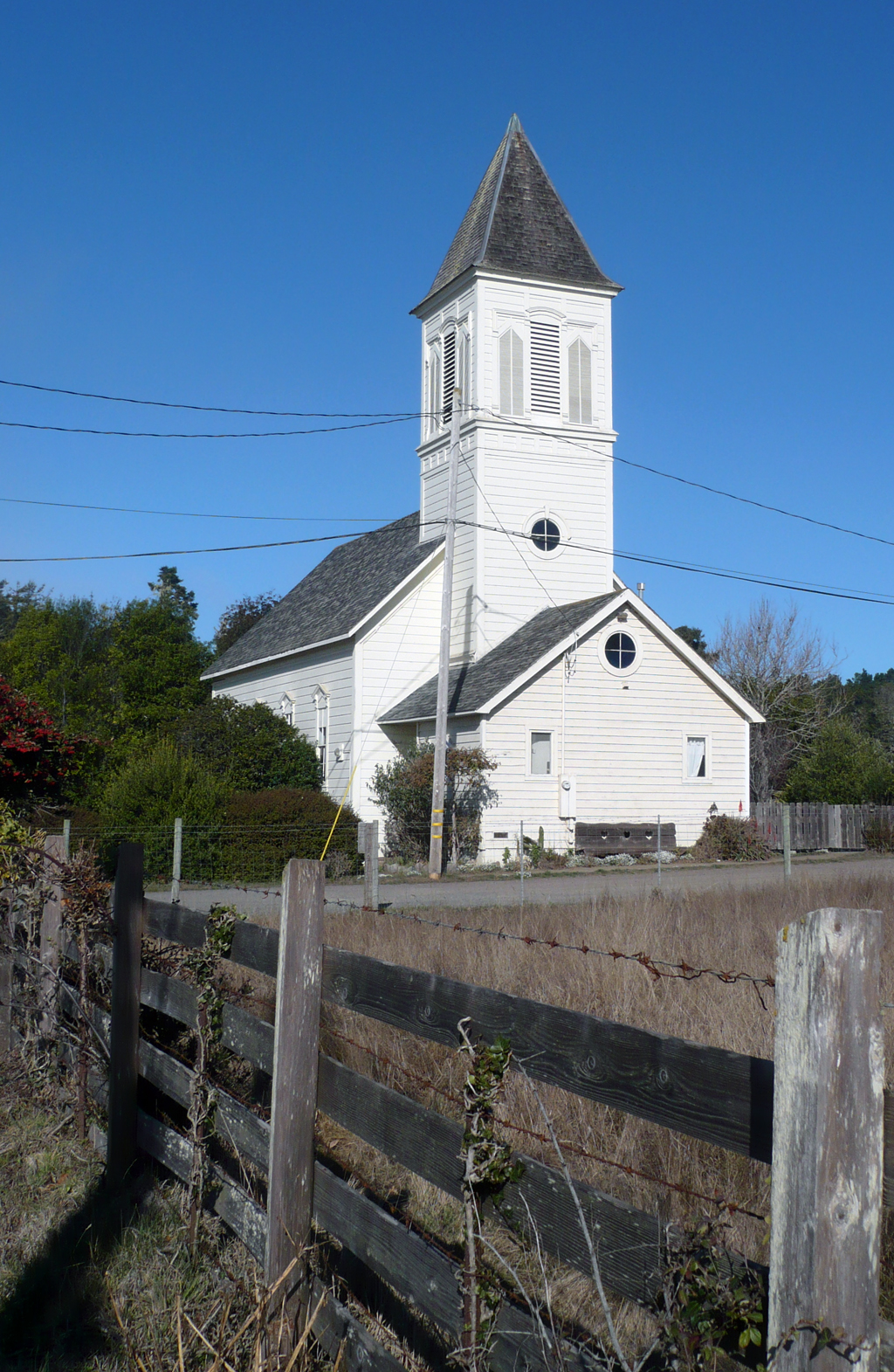
Church

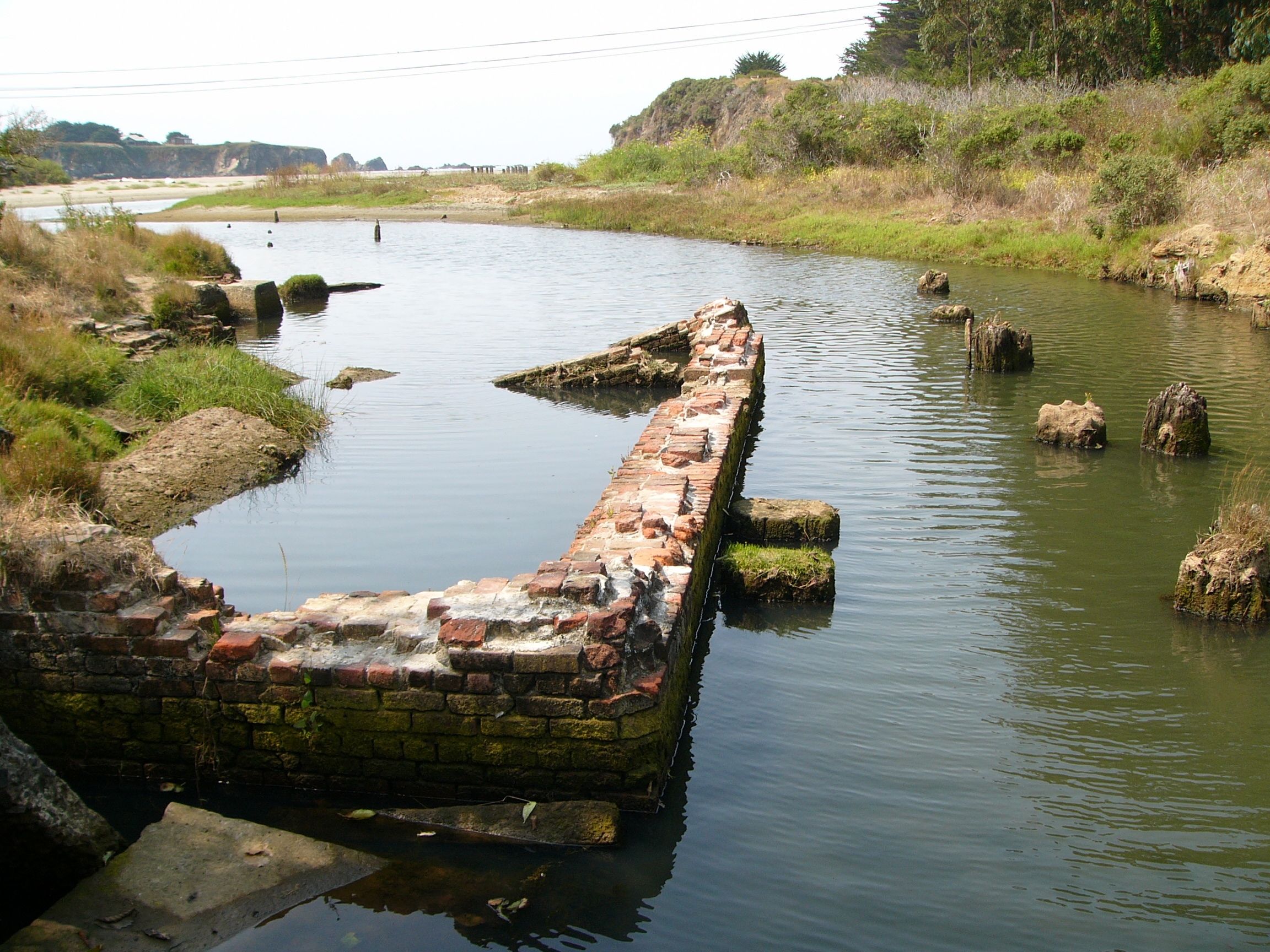
Mill ruins at Caspar beach

The Caspar post office opened in 1874 and closed on November 15, 1986, when postmaster Georgia Johnson retired.

As of 2013, Caspar had a community center, church and a nightclub. The Caspar Inn existed continuously as a roadhouse from its founding during the heyday of the logging era in 1906 until its closure in February 2013.

== Geography ==
Caspar is along the western edge of Mendocino County and is traversed by California State Route 1, which leads north 6 miles (10 km) to Fort Bragg and south 4 miles (6 km) to Mendocino. Caspar Creek crosses the southern part of the community, entering the Pacific Ocean at Caspar Anchorage, a small cove which is bordered by Caspar State Beach.

According to the United States Census Bureau, the CDP covers an area of 3.0 square miles (7.8 km^{2}), all land. The census bureau definition of the area as a CDP may not precisely correspond to local understanding of the area with the same name.

== Demographics ==
Historical population
Census	Pop.	Note	%±
2010	509		—
2020	500		−1.8%
U.S. Decennial Census; 1850–1870 1880-1890; 1900 1910 1920; 1930 1940 1950; 1960 1970 1980; 1990 2000 2010

Caspar first appeared as a census designated place in the 2010 U.S. census.

=== 2020 census ===
As of the 2020 census, Caspar had a population of 500. The median age was 58.3 years. 12.8% of residents were under the age of 18 and 40.8% of residents were 65 years of age or older. For every 100 females there were 100.8 males, and for every 100 females age 18 and over there were 93.8 males age 18 and over.

0.0% of residents lived in urban areas, while 100.0% lived in rural areas.

There were 243 households in Caspar, of which 16.0% had children under the age of 18 living in them. Of all households, 48.1% were married-couple households, 18.5% were households with a male householder and no spouse or partner present, and 22.6% were households with a female householder and no spouse or partner present. About 27.1% of all households were made up of individuals and 16.9% had someone living alone who was 65 years of age or older.

There were 320 housing units, of which 24.1% were vacant. The homeowner vacancy rate was 0.0% and the rental vacancy rate was 6.1%.

Racial composition as of the 2020 census
Race	Number	Percent
White	394	78.8%
Black or African American	1	0.2%
American Indian and Alaska Native	5	1.0%
Asian	5	1.0%
Native Hawaiian and Other Pacific Islander	0	0.0%
Some other race	13	2.6%
Two or more races	82	16.4%
Hispanic or Latino (of any race)	55	11.0%

=== 2010 census ===
The 2010 United States census reported that Caspar had a population of 509. The population density was 170.1 inhabitants per square mile (65.7/km^{2}). The racial makeup of Caspar was 474 (93.1%) White, 3 (0.6%) African American, 0 (0.0%) Native American, 8 (1.6%) Asian, 0 (0.0%) Pacific Islander, 3 (0.6%) from other races, and 21 (4.1%) from two or more races. Hispanic or Latino of any race were 15 persons (2.9%).

The Census reported that 507 people (99.6% of the population) lived in households, 2 (0.4%) lived in non-institutionalized group quarters, and 0 (0%) were institutionalized.

There were 252 households, out of which 33 (13.1%) had children under the age of 18 living in them, 109 (43.3%) were opposite-sex married couples living together, 15 (6.0%) had a female householder with no husband present, 7 (2.8%) had a male householder with no wife present. There were 28 (11.1%) unmarried opposite-sex partnerships, and 5 (2.0%) same-sex married couples or partnerships. 88 households (34.9%) were made up of individuals, and 38 (15.1%) had someone living alone who was 65 years of age or older. The average household size was 2.01. There were 131 families (52.0% of all households); the average family size was 2.47.

The population was spread out, with 51 people (10.0%) under the age of 18, 15 people (2.9%) aged 18 to 24, 96 people (18.9%) aged 25 to 44, 199 people (39.1%) aged 45 to 64, and 148 people (29.1%) who were 65 years of age or older. The median age was 57.1 years. For every 100 females, there were 90.6 males. For every 100 females age 18 and over, there were 90.8 males.

There were 336 housing units at an average density of 112.3 per square mile (43.4/km^{2}), of which 164 (65.1%) were owner-occupied, and 88 (34.9%) were occupied by renters. The homeowner vacancy rate was 4.0%; the rental vacancy rate was 7.4%. 345 people (67.8% of the population) lived in owner-occupied housing units and 162 people (31.8%) lived in rental housing units.

=== 2000 census ===
As of the census of 2000, there were 317 people, 145 households, and 77 in the ZCTA 95420. The population density was 41/sq mi. There were 204 housing units, of which 20.3% were vacant, with 12.1% reserved for vacation/recreational use. The racial makeup of the ZCTA was 88% White, .6% Black or African American, .6% Native American, .6% Asian, 4.7% from other races, and 5.4% from two or more races. 3.5% of the population were Hispanic or Latino of any race.

There were 145 households, out of which 19.3% had children under the age of 18 living with them, 42% were married couples living together, 8.3% had a female householder with no husband present, and 46.9% were non-families. 37.2% of all households were made up of individuals, and 9.7% had someone living alone who was 65 years of age or older. The average household size was 2.14 and the average family size was 2.77.

In the ZCTA the population was spread out, with 17% under the age of 18, 3.5% from 18 to 24, 23.6% from 25 to 44, 39.7% from 45 to 64, and 16.2% who were 65 years of age or older. The median age was 47 years. 47.6% of the population was male, 52.4 female.

The median income for a household in the ZCTA was $37,813, and the median income for a family was $47,639. Males had a median income of $55,357 versus $27,841 for females. The per capita income for the ZCTA was $26,191. 22% of the population and 42.4% of families were below the poverty line. Out of the total population, 43.6% of those under the age of 18 were living below the poverty line.

== Politics ==
In the state legislature, Caspar is in the 2nd senatorial district, represented by Democrat Mike McGuire, and the 2nd Assembly district, represented by Democrat Chris Rogers.

Federally, Caspar is in California's 2nd congressional district, represented by Democrat Jared Huffman.

== Education ==
Caspar is in the Mendocino Unified School District.

== Notable people ==
- Ronnie Gilbert, folk singer and activist
- Jerry Juhl, television and film writer
- Gene Parsons, musician, member of The Byrds
