= Jug Handle State Natural Reserve =

State park unit in California

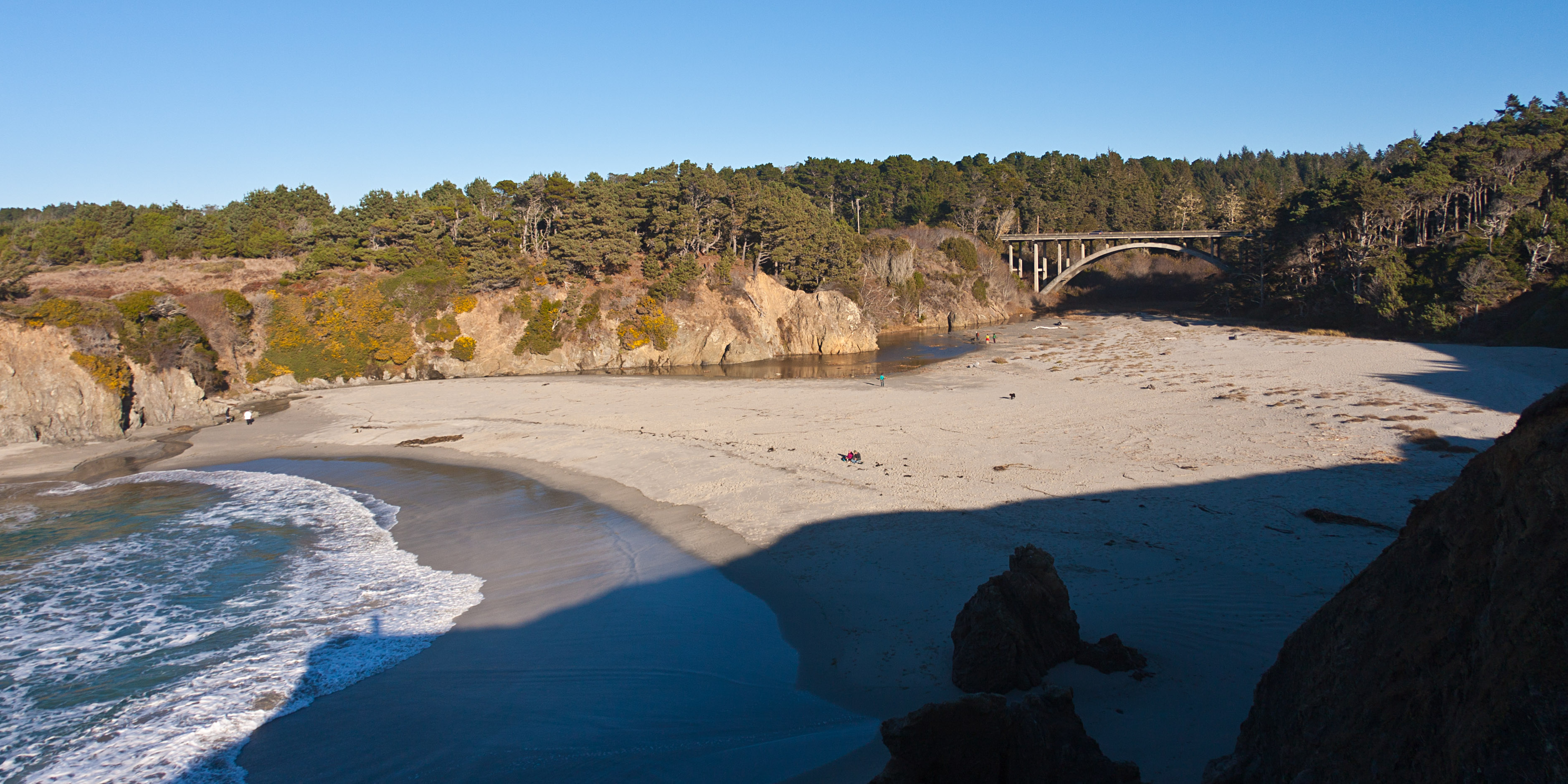
- Jug Handle Beach with visible headlands prairie, Sitka Spruce and Grand Fir krummholz, and stands of Bishop Pine

- Location within California Location within the United States
- Location: Mendocino County, California, United States
- Nearest city: Fort Bragg, California
- Coordinates: 39°22′31″N 123°48′37″W
- Area: 776 acres (314 ha)
- Established: 1976
- Governing body: California Department of Parks and Recreation

Jug Handle State Natural Reserve is a state park unit of California, United States, preserving a series of marine terraces each exhibiting a different stage of ecological succession. It is located on California State Route 1 north of the village of Caspar, five miles (8 km) equidistant between the towns of Mendocino and Fort Bragg. The 776-acre (314 ha) park was established in 1976.

== Natural history ==
The reserve encompasses five marine terraces along the Pacific coast, cut by wave action over millennia as the sea level fluctuated and the land underwent tectonic uplift. Each terrace has been above water about 100,000 years longer than the level below it. Consequently, each terrace contains a different plant community, with each level showing 100,000 years of progression through the stages of ecological succession. The lowest terrace supports prairie, the second bears a redwood forest, and the third exhibits a unique pygmy forest of 5-to-10-foot-tall (1.5 to 3.0 m) cypresses and pines and dwarfed shrubs of rhododendron, manzanita, and huckleberry. In 1969, the pygmy forest was designated as a National Natural Landmark by the National Park Service. The Ecological Staircase is a 2.5-mile (4.0 km) trail which traverses these three terraces from the coast to inland. According to the California Department of Parks and Recreation, "few places on earth display a more complete record of ecological succession." While marine terraces formed along much of the California coast, erosion has rendered them indistinct except in rare places like Jug Handle State Natural Reserve.

Along upper Jug Handle Creek are some sphagnum bogs containing mosses and insectivorous sundews.

== Cultural history ==
The park is named after Jug Handle Creek, which runs through it; the name "Jug Handle" is also sometimes spelled as a single word, and comes from the shape of a bend in the old road across the creek. California State Route 1 now crosses the creek on a concrete open-spandrel deck arch bridge, built in 1938.

In the 1960s, the Jug Handle area was threatened with logging and real estate development. Conservationist John Olmsted worked extensively with pedologist Hans Jenny and local activists to preserve the farmhouse and the bluffs between 1968 and 1972, ending in a landmark lawsuit, Burger v. Mendocino Board of Supervisors, involving the Pacific Holiday Lodge corporation, who had planned a motel on the bluffs overlooking the beach. The success was solidified by another case, Friends of Mammoth v. Board of Supervisors.

Jug Handle State Natural Reserve was one of 70 California state parks proposed for closure by July 2012, owing to the 2008–12 California budget crisis. Alden Olmsted, son of John Olmsted, spearheaded fundraising efforts, placing donation buckets at businesses throughout the region. The $9,500 raised, plus a matching donation from the California State Parks Foundation, will fund maintenance services at the reserve into 2013.

== See also ==
- List of California state parks
