= Digger Creek =

Stream in California, U.S.

Coordinates: 40.4248787°N 121.9152692°W

Digger Creek is a stream in the U.S. state of California. The stream flows for 19 miles (31 km) before it empties into North Fork Battle Creek.

The creek was named after the Digger Indians.
