= The Girl in the Picture =

The Girl in the Picture may refer to:

- The Girl in the Picture (1957 film), a British crime film directed by Don Chaffey
- The Girl in the Picture (1985 film), a British film directed by Cary Parker
- The Girl in the Picture: The Kim Phúc Story, the Photograph and the Vietnam War, a 1999 book by Denise Chong about Phan Thi Kim Phuc
- Girl in the Picture, a 2022 documentary film directed by Skye Borgman
