= Santa Rosa hitchhiker murders =

Series of unsolved murders and disappearances in Northern California in the 1970s

- Location: North Bay, California, U.S.
- Date: 1972–1973 (confirmed)
- Weapon: Various
- Victims: 7+
- Perpetrator: Unidentified
- Motive: Unknown (possibly sexual sadism)

Map of California with Sonoma County highlighted and (inset) map of Sonoma County with Santa Rosa highlighted.

The Santa Rosa hitchhiker murders was a series of at least seven unsolved homicides and unsolved disappearances all involving young female hitchhikers occurring within Santa Rosa and throughout Sonoma County in the North Bay area of California beginning in 1972. All of the victims were found nude and with very little physical evidence and were dumped within rural areas near steep embankments or in creek beds near roads. The crime scenes were separate from the body location sites and were never located. California police believe that the perpetrator of the Santa Rosa murders "interviewed" potential victims before killing them. Despite several extensive investigations involving previously identified serial killers, the culprit(s) have remained unidentified for over fifty years.

== Victims ==
=== Maureen Sterling and Yvonne Weber ===
Maureen Louise Sterling, 12, and Yvonne Lisa Weber, 13, both Herbert Slater Middle School students, disappeared around 9 p.m. on February 4, 1972, after visiting the Redwood Empire Ice Arena. Both girls, like other young people in that era, often hitchhiked. They were last seen hitchhiking on Guerneville Road, northwest of Santa Rosa.

In 2019, an acquaintance who had spoken with them earlier that evening recalled that Sterling and Weber had told her that a tall, slender man had asked them to smoke marijuana. The friend declined to accompany the girls to smoke with the man, whom she had never seen before. The witness told interviewers that she thought the man she saw in the lobby at the ice arena resembled serial killer Ted Bundy. The girls, whom the friend described as dressed in such a way that they were able to pass for several years older than they actually were, disappeared a short time later.

The friend was also interviewed in the 2024 HBO Max documentary The Truth About Jim and said she saw the man in profile as he stood in the lobby watching the skaters on the ice. She said he resembled a photograph of suspect Jim Mordecai, the subject of the documentary, taken in the early-1970s. Other reports at the time indicated that the two girls might have been looking for a ride to meet someone at a bowling alley. There were rumors that the girls might have previously been in contact with a man who lived along the Russian River, but police could not confirm that connection either. Classmates of the girls were questioned about their whereabouts at school the following week, but none of the leads police received proved fruitful. Police had believed the girls were runaways.

Their bodies were found on December 28, 1972, 2.2 miles (3.5 km) north of Porter Creek Road on Franz Valley Road, down a steep embankment approximately 66 feet (20 m) off the east side of the roadway. A single earring, orange beads and a 14-carat gold necklace with a cross were found at the scene. The cause of death could not be determined from the skeletal remains. Sterling's mother identified the cross necklace and earring as her daughter's property. The mate to the earring was not found at the scene. Binding materials were found in the brush at the site that suggested the two girls had been restrained by their killer or killers. No clothing or other items belonging to the girls were found.

=== Kim Wendy Allen ===
Santa Rosa Junior College art student Kim Wendy Allen, 19, was also a frequent hitchhiker despite hearing warnings from her mother and one of her college professors about the danger of rape and/or murder for young female hitchhikers. Allen, like many other young women during that era, did not believe she was at risk. She was given a ride by two men on March 4, 1972, from her job at Larkspur Natural Foods to San Rafael. They last saw her at approximately 5:20 p.m. hitchhiking to school near the Bell Avenue entrance to Highway 101, northbound, carrying a large wooden soy barrel with red Chinese characters on it. Her body was found the following day down an embankment in a creek bed 20 feet (6.1 m) off Enterprise Road in Santa Rosa. The victim had been bound at the ankles and wrists, raped and slowly strangled with a cord for an estimated thirty minutes.

Semen was recovered from the body and a single gold loop earring was found at the site. Markings at the top of the embankment and a possible leg impression in the loam indicated the assailant likely slipped or fell while throwing or transporting the body. The two men who gave her a ride, one of whom was given and passed a polygraph test, were ruled out as suspects. Her checkbook was deposited in a drive-up mailbox across from the Kentfield, California Post Office sometime on the morning of March 24, 1972, 20 days after she was murdered. Police thought two fingerprints on the checkbook might belong to the killer. When she was found, Allen also had an oily substance on her right side that authorities said was similar to the oil used in a machine shop.

=== Lori Lee Kursa ===
Lori Lee Kursa, 13, a Lawrence Cook Middle School student,had been reported missing by her mother on November 11, 1972, after she disappeared while they shopped at a U-Save. Kursa was last definitely seen on November 20 or 21 in Santa Rosa while visiting friends. Kursa had deliberately run away. Someone later reported possibly seeing Kursa hitchhiking on November 30. Kursa’s home life was troubled and she had been a frequent hitchhiker and habitual runaway. Her frozen remains were located on December 14, 1972, in a ravine approximately 50 feet (15 m) off Calistoga Road, northeast of Rincon Valley in Santa Rosa. The killer had thrown the body at least 30 feet (9.1 m) over an embankment. The girl had a single wire loop in each earlobe, but the rest of the earrings were missing and were not found at the scene.

The cause of her death was a broken neck with compression and hemorrhage of the spinal cord. The victim had not been raped and likely died one to two weeks prior to discovery. Two people later called in tips to the police about possible sightings of Kursa. One tipster reported seeing two men with a girl on Calistoga Road. A second caller reported seeing a girl with a Caucasian man who had “bushy” hair in a pickup truck that had been parked near the site where Kursa was later found deceased. Neither caller was able to provide further details.

A possible witness to her abduction later came forward stating that on an evening somewhere between December 3 and 9, 1972, while on Parkhurst Drive, he saw two men walking with a young girl. The girl, who fit Kursa's description, appeared to be physically impaired in some manner, as the two men were supporting her between them. The witness saw the men run across the road with the girl and push her into the back of a van that had been parked on the side of the roadway. The driver was a Caucasian man with an Afro-type hairstyle. The vehicle then sped north on Calistoga Road.

Authorities speculated that Kursa was kidnapped, forced into the van, stripped of her clothing, and that she opened the passenger door of the speeding vehicle in an attempt to escape her captor or captors, fell or jumped or was pushed out and broke her neck in the fall into the ravine. Her captor or captors left her by the side of the road. The broken neck would have prevented Kursa from moving, but it would have taken some time for her to die from the injury.

=== Carolyn Davis ===
Carolyn Nadine Davis, 15, ran away from her home outside Anderson in Shasta County on February 6, 1973, and spent the next five months traveling. She had left her mother a note that said: “Dear Mom. Don't worry too much about me, the only thing I'm gonna be doing is keeping myself alive. Love, Carolyn.” She posted a letter to her mother and stepfather shortly after she ran away in which she wrote that she had left voluntarily and never planned to return home. Her older sister told an interviewer in 2022 that Davis actually stayed with her in her duplex apartment in Garberville, California after she ran away. Davis claimed she had witnessed a double murder in Shasta County and that she was afraid for her life.

Eventually Davis, increasingly paranoid that she might be found by someone connected with the murders, left her sister's apartment and hitchhiked to Illinois. She returned to Garberville in the summer of 1973 because her sister was about to give birth. Davis stayed with her grandmother for about two weeks in July 1973 before she decided to leave to return to her boyfriend in Illinois.

According to accounts, Davis told her grandmother that she planned to hitchhike to Modesto, California and stay there with friends. Her grandmother drove the 15-year-old girl to the downtown district of Garberville on July 15, 1973, and parked in front of the post office, which was located two city blocks away from Highway 101. Davis was last seen hitchhiking that afternoon near the Highway 101 ramp, southbound, in Garberville. Davis was never heard from again.

Her body was discovered on July 31, 1973 in Santa Rosa, just 3 feet (0.91 m) from where the remains of Sterling and Weber had been recovered seven months prior. The cause of her death was strychnine poisoning 10 to 14 days before discovery. It could not be determined whether the poison had been administered to Davis by needle or by pill. Strychnine was sometimes mixed with other drugs, but an autopsy showed no trace of either heroin or amphetamines in her system.

A pathologist determined her probable date of death was July 20, 1973, five days after her grandmother had last seen her. It could not be determined if she had been raped. An autopsy found that Davis had an injury to her right earlobe that appeared to be an attempted ear piercing. Her left earlobe had not been pierced. Investigators postulated that her 5 feet 7 inch, 100 pound body had been thrown from the road by her killer or killers as the hillside brush appeared undisturbed. An investigator said a witchcraft symbol meaning "carrier of spirits" was found by her body.

Police reported in 1975 that it was “a rectangle connected to a square, with bars running alongside” constructed of twigs or sticks. It was identified as an occult symbol dating back to medieval England and suggested a possible connection to the Zodiac Killer. The symbol was located on the roadway above the site where Davis was found. After Davis was found murdered, while her sister was working as a hotel maid at the California Motel in Anderson, she found a map in a room she was cleaning that had belonged to Davis and had been in her possession when she left Garberville. It had been written on by both Davis and her older sister who gave the map to the local police and also spoke with investigators in both Shasta and Sonoma Counties.

=== Theresa Walsh ===
Theresa Diane Smith Walsh, 23, left her home in Miranda, in the winter of 1973 to spend time away from her husband and young son. She hitchhiked her way across California, often catching rides along Highway 101. She had never before had any difficulties or thought she was in danger while hitchhiking. In late December 1973, she was in Malibu, California but wanted to go home for Christmas to see her mother and son. She was last seen on December 22, 1973, at Zuma Beach in Malibu, intent on hitchhiking to Garberville. Her partially submerged body was found six days later by kayakers in Mark West Creek. She had been hogtied with clothesline rope, sexually assaulted, and strangled, and was determined to have been dead approximately one week. High water marks contemporaneous with heavy rains in the area suggested the body could have drifted several miles.

=== Sonoma County Jane Doe ===
On July 2, 1979, the skeletal remains of a young white female were found in a ravine off Calistoga Road approximately 100 yards (91 m) from where the body of Lori Lee Kursa had been recovered seven years earlier. Due to the age of the remains, authorities initially believed them to be those of Jeannette Kamahele until a comparison of dental records later proved negative. The victim had been hogtied and her arm fractured around the time of her murder, and her corpse had been stuffed into a laundry or duffel bag before being dumped in the ravine, but there was no other evidence to establish a cause of death.

It was determined that the unidentified victim was approximately 16- to 21-years-old, wore hard contact lenses (kept in a metal candy tin with a picture of cherries on it), had red, auburn, or brown hair, was about 5 feet 3 inches (1.60 m) tall and at one time had broken a rib which was healed by the time of the murder. Her weight and eye color could not be ascertained, and no clothing was found. One expert consulted by authorities determined that the victim was likely killed between 1972 and 1974 and was about 19 years old. Hard contact lenses were not often sold in the United States and Canada after the mid-1970s when soft contact lenses became available. She had also been bound in the same manner as Walsh.

== Possible victims ==
=== Lisa Michele Smith ===
Lisa Michele Smith, 17, was last seen hitchhiking, a short distance away from her foster home, along Hearn Avenue in Santa Rosa. She was initially reported missing from Petaluma, California, by her foster parents on March 16, 1971. Shortly afterward, a young woman named "Lisa Smith", was hitchhiking on March 26, 1971, and was picked up by a male driver. He reportedly brandished a gun and threatened to rape her. She jumped out of the pickup, which was going about 55 miles per hour south of Novato, California. She was treated at Novato General Hospital for a skull fracture and multiple, severe cuts and bruises. A nurse at the hospital thought she looked about 21-years-old.

An article published on April 1, 1971, in the Santa Rosa Press Democrat reported that the "Lisa Smith" treated at Novato General Hospital was the same person as the missing 17-year-old Lisa Smith. The individual believed to have been Smith left the hospital before authorities could interview her and purportedly hitchhiked back to San Francisco. Her biological parents then located her shortly afterwards and took her back to their home in Livermore, California, according to the article, which quoted a juvenile officer from the sheriff's office.

However, the Press Democrat reported in 2011 that the missing 17-year-old Lisa Smith was not actually found. It is still not certain whether the two Smiths actually were the same woman or whether they were two separate people. All of the hospital and law enforcement records related to the case were missing by 2011 and authorities hoped to find Lisa Smith or someone who had known her to determine what had happened. Authorities suspect it is possible that she was a homicide victim or that her case could have been related to the other attacks in the area during the same time period.

=== Jeannette Kamahele ===
Jeannette Kamahele, a 20-year-old Santa Rosa Junior College student of Hawaiian descent was last seen on April 25, 1972, hitchhiking near the Cotati on-ramp of Highway 101. Like other young people in the early 1970s, she often hitchhiked to get around. A friend witnessed her likely abduction and reported that she entered a faded brown Chevrolet pickup truck fitted with a homemade wooden camper and driven by a 20- to 30-year-old Caucasian male with an Afro hairstyle. Her body has never been found.

=== Kerry Ann Graham and Francine Marie Trimble ===
Kerry Ann Graham, 15, and Francine Marie Trimble, 14, of Forestville, California disappeared on December 16, 1978, after leaving their homes to visit a shopping mall in Santa Rosa. According to some reports, the girls had planned to attend a party in Santa Rosa. An acquaintance saw them hitchhiking at a gas station in Forestville, California. Their remains were discovered in July 1979 approximately 80 mi (130 km) north of Forestville, concealed within duct-taped garbage bags and buried within an embankment of a heavily overgrown woodland area located beside a remote section of Highway 20, 12 mi (19 km) from the city of Willits. Due to the advanced state of decomposition of the girls' remains, the specific cause of death of each victim has never been established, although both girls' deaths have always been considered to be a homicide. Furthermore, Graham's body was mistakenly identified as that of a male until genetic testing proved otherwise. The bodies of Graham and Trimble would remain unidentified until November 2015, when their identities were confirmed via the use of DNA profiling. The case itself remains one of the oldest cold cases within Mendocino County.

=== 1975 report on additional victims ===
In 1975, some sources say the Federal Bureau of Investigation issued a report stating that fourteen unsolved homicides between 1972 and 1974 were committed by the same perpetrator. These consist of the six found victims as of 1975 and the following:

- Rosa Vasquez, 20, last seen May 26; her body was found on May 29, 1973 near the Arguello boulevard entrance at Golden Gate Park in San Francisco. The victim had been strangled and her body thrown 7 feet (2.1 m) off the roadway into some shrubs. Vasquez had been a keypunch operator at Letterman General Hospital on the Presidio.
- Yvonne Quilantang, 15, was found strangled in a vacant Bayview district lot on June 10, 1973. She was seven months pregnant and had been out to buy groceries.
- Angela Thomas, 16, a resident of Belton, Texas, was found July 2, 1973, smothered on the playground of Benjamin Franklin Junior High School in Daly City. She had last been seen the previous evening at the Presidio of San Francisco walking away from the area at 9:00 p.m. A locket was recovered near the body.
- Nancy Patricia Gidley, a 24-year-old radiographer last seen at a Rodeway Inn motel on July 12, 1973, was found strangled behind the George Washington High School gymnasium three days later. The victim was unclothed except for a single fish-shaped gold earring and was determined to have died within the previous 24 hours. Gidley had served four years in the Air Force and told friends and family in Mountain Home, Idaho that she intended to become a freelance writer for the San Francisco Chronicle and was going to San Francisco to be the maid of honor at the wedding of a friend from Hamilton Air Force Base, all of which proved false.
- Nancy Feusi, 22, disappeared after going dancing at a club in the Sacramento area. Her remains were found on July 22, 1973, in Redding. She had been stabbed to death. In 2011, one of Feusi's five children, Angela Darlene Feusi McAnulty, was convicted of torturing, beating, and starving to death her 15-year-old daughter Jeanette Marie Maples. McAnulty became the second woman ever sentenced to die in Oregon and the first since the 1984 reinstatement of the death penalty.
- Laura Albright O'Dell, 21, missing since November 4, 1973, was found three days later in bushes behind the boathouse at Stow Lake in Golden Gate Park. O'Dell's hands were tied behind her back, and the cause of death appeared to be from head injuries or strangulation.
- Brenda Kaye Merchant, 19, was found stabbed to death at her home on February 1, 1974, in Marysville. She had been stabbed over 30 times with a long bladed knife and had asphyxiated on her own blood from her many wounds. The killer left a bloody handprint on the screen door of the apartment, and it is believed that Merchant was attacked between when she was last seen at 6 p.m. to when a loud argument was heard by neighbors at around midnight.
- Donna Maria Braun, 14, whose strangled body was found at 7 p.m. on September 29, 1974 in the Salinas River near Monterey by a crop dusting pilot who was flying overhead. She was an Alisal High School freshman who lived with and was eventually identified by her mother and was last seen at 6.pm. on September 27, leaving her Salinas home.

=== Other victims ===
Law enforcement have considered the possibility that the perpetrator of the Santa Rosa crimes also killed in Oregon, Washington State, Utah, and Colorado. Police have also looked into links with the Flat Tire Murders, which occurred in Southern Florida. In 1986, author Robert Graysmith published a list of forty-nine confirmed and possible Zodiac Killer victims. The list included the Santa Rosa victims and additional murders with some similarities. These included:

- Elaine Louise Davis, aged 17, who disappeared on December 1, 1969, from her home in Walnut Creek, California. On December 19, the body of a young woman was discovered floating off Light House Point near Santa Cruz.
- Leona LaRell Roberts, aged 16, whose nude body was found ten days before the winter solstice on the beach at Bolinas Lagoon in Marin County, on December 28, 1969. She had been kidnapped from her boyfriend's home on December 10. Her death was treated as a homicide, although the official cause was listed as "exposure" by the medical examiner.
- Marie Antoinette Anstey, aged 23, who was kidnapped in Vallejo after being stunned by a blow to the head, and then drowned. Her body was recovered in rural Lake County on March 21, and an autopsy revealed traces of mescaline in her bloodstream.
- Eva Lucienne Blau, aged 17, who was found clubbed to death and dumped in a roadside gully near Santa Rosa during the equinox on March 20, 1970. The medical examiner discovered drugs in her circulatory system. She was last seen on March 12, leaving Jack London Hall after telling friends that she was heading home.

The body of Davis was dumped off the coast of Santa Cruz, California, but not identified until 2001. Roberts was abducted from Rodeo and her body left on a beach near Bolinas. On the evening of December 3, 1969, 21-year-old college student Kathy Sosic accepted a ride from outside the Sonoma State College library to her home in nearby Cotati, California. The male driver turned away from Cotati and pulled out a handgun. Sosic escaped by jumping from the moving vehicle; she was not seriously injured.

== Suspects ==
=== The Zodiac Killer ===
The unapprehended Zodiac Killer is a suspect, due to similarities between an unknown symbol on his January 29, 1974 "Exorcist letter" to the San Francisco Chronicle, in which he claims 37 victims, and the Chinese characters on the missing soy barrel carried by Kim Allen, as well as stating an intention to vary his modus operandi in an earlier November 9, 1969 letter to the San Francisco Chronicle: "I shall no longer announce to anyone. when I comitt my murders, they shall look like routine robberies, killings of anger, + a few fake accidents, etc." (sic) Law enforcement reportedly ruled out Zodiac because the SRHM crimes appeared to have included sexual assaults and the (most likely and confirmed) Zodiac attacks did not.

=== Arthur Leigh Allen ===
Arthur Leigh Allen, of Vallejo, owned a mobile home at Sunset Trailer Park in Santa Rosa at the time of the murders. He had been fired from his Valley Springs Elementary School teaching position for suspected child molestation in 1968 and was a full-time student at Sonoma State University. Allen was arrested on September 27, 1974, by the Sonoma County Sheriff's Office and charged with child molestation in an unrelated case involving a young boy. He pleaded guilty on March 14, 1975, and was imprisoned at Atascadero State Hospital until late 1977. Robert Graysmith, in his book Zodiac Unmasked, claimed that a Sonoma County sheriff revealed that chipmunk hairs were found on all of the Santa Rosa Hitchhiker victims and that Allen had been collecting and studying the same species. Allen has been the main suspect in the Zodiac case since 1971.

=== Ted Bundy ===
After his capture for similar crimes in Washington, Colorado, Utah and Idaho, Ted Bundy was suspected in the murders. Bundy had spent time in neighboring Marin County, but was ruled out by a Sonoma County detective in the late-1970s and again in 1989. Detailed credit card records reveal that Bundy was in Washington State on the dates of some of the disappearances. A 2011 San Francisco Chronicle article noted that the dates of the receipts show that there would have been enough time for Bundy to drive to California and then drive back to Washington. Bundy was known to drive hundreds of miles to commit a murder and confessed to having murdered in California. Investigators also rule Bundy out because they believe that the killer likely lived in the Santa Rosa area and worked as a mail carrier or a public utility worker, who would have been familiar with the remote, rural locations where the victims were recovered.

=== Fredric Manalli ===
Fredric Manalli was a Santa Rosa Junior College creative writing instructor who was suspected of the murders following the discovery of sadomasochistic drawings he had created depicting a former student, Kim Wendy Allen, who was among the victims. The drawings, as well as one of Allen's backpacks, were found among his belongings following his death on August 24, 1976 in a head-on collision on Highway 12. Investigators also reportedly found other obscene drawings Manalli had made involving other girls and himself.

=== Kenneth Bianchi and Angelo Buono Jr. ===
Kenneth Bianchi and Angelo Buono Jr., also known as the "Hillside Stranglers", were suspected in the murders. Between 1977 and 1978, Bianchi and Buono murdered ten women and girls across Los Angeles, some of the victims being found dumped in the wooded hillsides surrounding the city.

=== Joseph Naso ===
Serial killer and rapist Joseph Naso was named as a suspect in the murders. Naso was convicted of the murders of four women between 1974 and 1994, and is a suspect in numerous other unsolved homicides.

=== Jack Bokin ===
Jack Alexander Bokin, a serial rapist who died in prison in December 2021 at age 78, has been suggested as another possible suspect by law enforcement after DNA testing linked him in 2022 to the 1996 murder of 32-year-old Michelle Veal. At the time of his death, Bokin was in prison for a series of rapes and for the 1997 attempted murder of a 19-year-old female victim. Bokin had a long history of criminal offenses and antisocial behavior beginning when he was a child, including violent sexual assault. His first criminal conviction for assault was in 1964, when he was 21. He served a prison sentence for that crime and also served five prison sentences for burglary at different times between 1970 and 1990.

=== Jim Mordecai ===
The 2024 Max documentary The Truth About Jim explored the possibility that Jim Mordecai, a high school vocational agriculture teacher and part-time landscape designer, might have been responsible for the Santa Rosa murders. Mordecai, who died of cancer in 2008, had no known criminal record. His family had an isolated ranch in Sonoma County where he often spent time in the early 1970s. After his death, family members found a box of mismatched female jewellery among his effects, which belonged to no one in Mordecai's family. One item (a hoop earring with orange beads attached) matched the description of a piece of jewellery worn by one of the victims. However, the family did not keep any of the items. A DNA profile of Mordecai and other information regarding him was turned over to the Sonoma County Sheriff's Department in August 2022.

== See also ==
- Murders of Kerry Graham and Francine Trimble
- Hitchhiking § Safety

General:

- List of fugitives from justice who disappeared
- List of serial killers in the United States
