= Murders of Kerry Graham and Francine Trimble =

Unsolved murder of two American teens in 1978

Kerry Graham and Francine Trimble
- Kerry Graham (left) and Francine Trimble
- Born: Kerry Ann Graham; November 12, 1963; Orange County, California, U.S. Francine Marie Trimble; September 27, 1964; Novato, Marin County, California, U.S.
- Disappeared: December 16, 1978; Forestville, Sonoma County, U.S.
- Died: c. December 17, 1978
- Cause of death: Undetermined. Possible strangulation.
- Body discovered: July 8, 1979; Willits, California, U.S. 39.40228°N 123.38977°W (approximate)
- Other names: Case File #111UMCA (Graham); Case File #131UFCA (Trimble)
- Occupation: Students
- Known for: Victims of unsolved child murder

The murders of Kerry Graham and Francine Trimble are the unsolved abduction and murder of two teenage girls—aged 15 and 14 respectively— who disappeared after leaving their homes in Forestville, California, to visit a shopping mall in Santa Rosa on December 16, 1978; their remains were discovered in July 1979 approximately 80 mi (130 km) north of Forestville, concealed within duct-taped garbage bags and buried within an embankment of a heavily overgrown woodland area beside a remote section of Highway 20, 12 mi (19 km) from the city of Willits.

Due to the advanced state of decomposition of the girls' remains, the specific cause of death of each victim has never been established, although their deaths have always been considered to be a homicide. Furthermore, Graham's body was mistakenly identified as that of a male until genetic testing proved otherwise.

The bodies of Kerry Graham and Francine Trimble would remain unidentified until November 2015, when their identities were confirmed via the use of DNA profiling. The case itself remains one of the oldest cold cases within Mendocino County.

== Early life ==
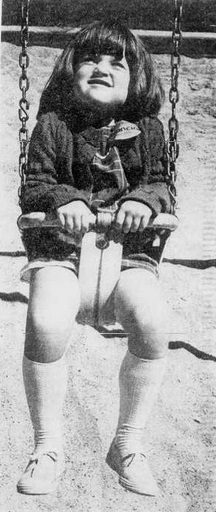
Francine Trimble, pictured at age four in July 1969

Kerry Ann Graham was born in Orange County, California, on November 12, 1963, the youngest of three children born to Herbert Copp and Mary Ann Margarette Elizabeth (née Hill) Graham. She had one brother, Ronald (b. 1957), and one sister, Kelly (b. 1961).

Francine Marie Trimble was born in Novato, California, on September 27, 1964, the younger of two children born to Ira Gerald and Mary Christine (née Walsh) Trimble. She had one older brother, Andrew (b. 1962).

Graham and Trimble both resided in Forestville, California. Although the two girls were next-door neighbors and—by 1978—inseparable friends, having known one another since they had become acquainted while attending elementary school, they hailed from markedly different backgrounds: Graham was raised in a stable and reasonably wealthy family home (although she and each of her siblings are known to have briefly run away from home in their teens), whereas Trimble hailed from a broken home of modest means. She and her brother were raised by their mother—her father, an alcoholic, having abandoned his family shortly before her birth. As such, Trimble seldom saw her father, and was raised by a succession of stepfathers in addition to occasionally being placed in foster care.

The personalities of the girls were also markedly different: Graham a confident, outspoken and temperamental teenager, with Trimble being markedly shy and reserved and somewhat the follower of the two. Due to the fact Graham was one year older than Trimble, she enrolled at El Molino High School in September 1978, whereas Trimble advanced to the eighth grade at Forestville School. Despite attending different schools in the 1978-79 school year, the two remained close, with one relative later recollecting: "If one wasn't home, [we] knew [she] was with her best friend." According to one childhood friend, Graham and Trimble would also occasionally truant together.

== Disappearances ==
On December 16, 1978, the two girls left their homes, reportedly to visit the Coddingtown Mall in Santa Rosa, with Graham having informed her mother of her intentions to shop for Christmas gifts prior to leaving her household. Neither family ever heard from their daughter again.

Within twenty-four hours of her disappearance, Trimble's mother had filed a missing person report on her daughter with the Sonoma County Sheriff's Office; Graham was reported missing to the same sheriff's office on Christmas Eve the same month. (Note: The reporting of Graham's disappearance was likely delayed slightly due to her having previously run away from home, or opting to stay with friends, without notifying her parents, although she had always returned home after short periods of time.) Family members of both girls informed investigators of their fears that their daughters had become the victims of foul play, perhaps having been kidnapped prior to their departing to the mall from the Trimble residence, and possibly by someone they knew, as there were no signs of a disturbance having occurred at either girl's residence, and makeup was found arranged upon a dresser in Trimble's bedroom. In addition, neither girl had taken any personal possessions from her household prior to her disappearance, and although Graham was known to have previously run away from her home, at the time of her disappearance, she had recently undergone an operation to remove her appendix and was still physically recovering from the procedure, having also left her prescribed antibiotics in her bedroom. Nonetheless, neither family could completely discount the possibility the girls may have hitchhiked to various regions, including New Jersey, or as far as Nova Scotia, Canada. (Note: The actual date of the girls' disappearance was inconsistently listed among various missing persons organizations. Some organizations stated the girls had disappeared on differing dates in December 1978, with others listing the date of Graham's disappearance as December 24, 1979.)

=== Initial investigation ===
Upon retracing the girls' movements, investigators concluded Graham had arrived at Trimble's home on the date of the girls' disappearance when no other member of Francine's family had been present within the household, and that the two girls were likely together at the time of their disappearance later that day. Furthermore, although investigators initially concluded the most likely explanation for the girls' disappearance was that they had been runaways, they could not discount the families' theory both girls had been abducted from Trimble's home. As no signs of a struggle were noted within the Trimble household, had this been the case, the two girls would have either known their abductor, or been taken from the residence at gunpoint.

Detectives had few tangible leads to pursue as to the girls' whereabouts, and the investigation into their disappearance rapidly waned. By mid-1979, the case had largely become cold. The aunt of Francine Trimble would later recollect that on one occasion, out of sheer desperation, her family had contacted a psychic in the hope of obtaining information regarding the girls' whereabouts and welfare.

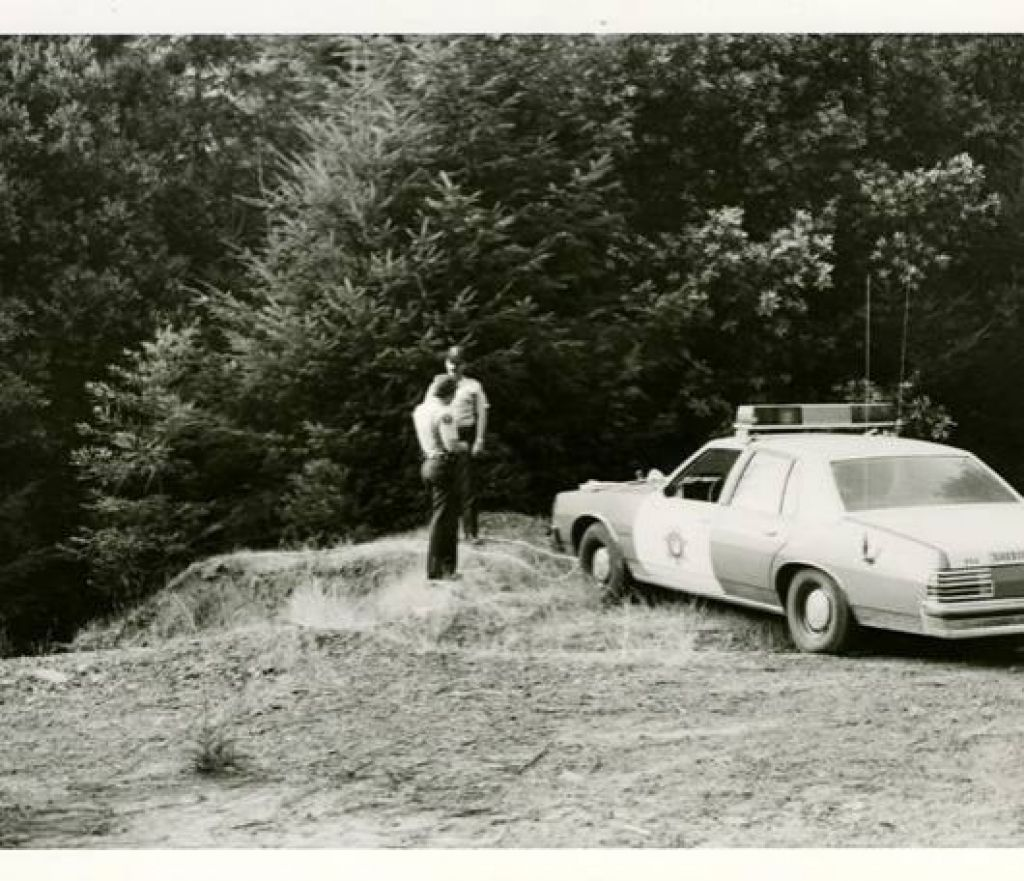
Mendocino County police officers at the location where the bodies of Graham and Trimble were discovered, July 8, 1979

== Discovery ==
The unclothed, skeletal remains of Graham and Trimble were discovered by two tourists traveling to Fort Bragg, California on the afternoon of July 8, 1979. Following a minor argument within the car, the two tourists had stopped their vehicle on private land near the Jackson Demonstration State Forest, alongside Highway 20 in Mendocino County, approximately 12 miles west of Willits and 80 miles from the girls' residences. One of these individuals exited his vehicle to briefly walk in the vicinity where the two had parked. Venturing into a steep, heavily overgrown area near James Creek, this individual located a human skull protruding from a shallow grave in brush midway down an embankment of the creek, a short distance from the road. The tourists left a can of soda at the side of the road to mark the location of the remains and drove to the city of Willits, where they reported their discovery to the police.

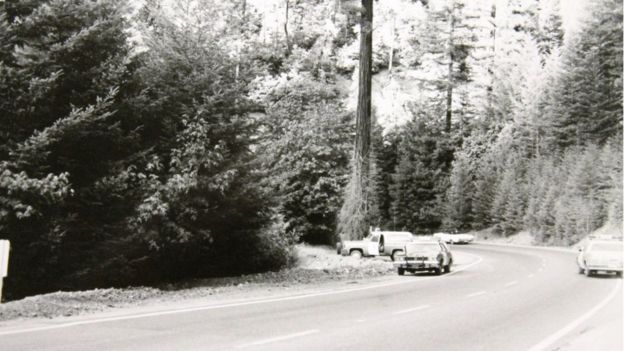
External view of the location upon Highway 20 where the girls' bodies were discovered. July 8, 1979

Responding to the tourists' discovery, Mendocino County sheriff's deputies extensively searched the area in and around James Creek, finding numerous skeletal remains later determined to belong to two individuals. Both victims had been bound with duct tape and concealed within plastic, before being buried in a shallow grave. Sections of duct tape, hair, and numerous bones were scattered in the vicinity of this grave—indicating the bodies had been disturbed by wild animals. Investigators would subsequently conclude the two victims had been murdered elsewhere, and their bodies later buried at the scene of their discovery, with this act most likely occurring after nightfall. No clothing was present with either set of remains, although a solitary shell earring depicting a bird—later determined to belong to Francine Trimble—was discovered at the scene.

Following a two-day search of the crime scene, in which approximately 90 percent of the victims' bones were recovered with FBI assistance, the remains recovered from the embankment alongside Highway 20 were sent to the coroner's office to undergo a thorough forensic examination.

== Investigation ==
=== Initial examination ===
The initial autopsies conducted upon the remains recovered from James Creek revealed little accurate forensic information about the victims beyond the fact both had been approximately 14 years of age, likely of Caucasian race, and that the two victims had likely been murdered on or about December 8, 1978. However, the coroner was unable to determine whether the victims' remains were male or female, but after further examining the remains with the assistance of a forensic pathologist, declared one decedent had been male and the other female. By 1980, the results of all tests conducted upon the remains had been concluded. The results of these initial examinations also established several approximations of the physical statistics of the victims, including their sexes, ages and heights, and although the actual cause of the victims' deaths could not be determined due to the advanced state of decomposition and the lack of any evident trauma upon the largely skeletal remains, both the coroner and the forensic pathologist could not exclude the possibility that each victim had been strangled to death.

Although both victims were correctly determined to be of Caucasian race, both the coroner and the forensic pathologist determined they could not be completely sure of the specific ethnicity, (Note: Kerry Ann Graham is known to have been of partial Native American ancestry, which is a likely factor in the ambiguous conclusion as to her ethnicity.) or the precise gender of one of the recovered bodies, which was initially determined to be that of a male. The initial autopsy reports also erroneously concluded the two victims may have been related, stating there was a "high probability" the two decedents were a brother and sister. (Note: Mistakes pertaining to determining the gender of skeletal remains are not uncommon, particularly in determining the gender of child and adolescent decedents.)

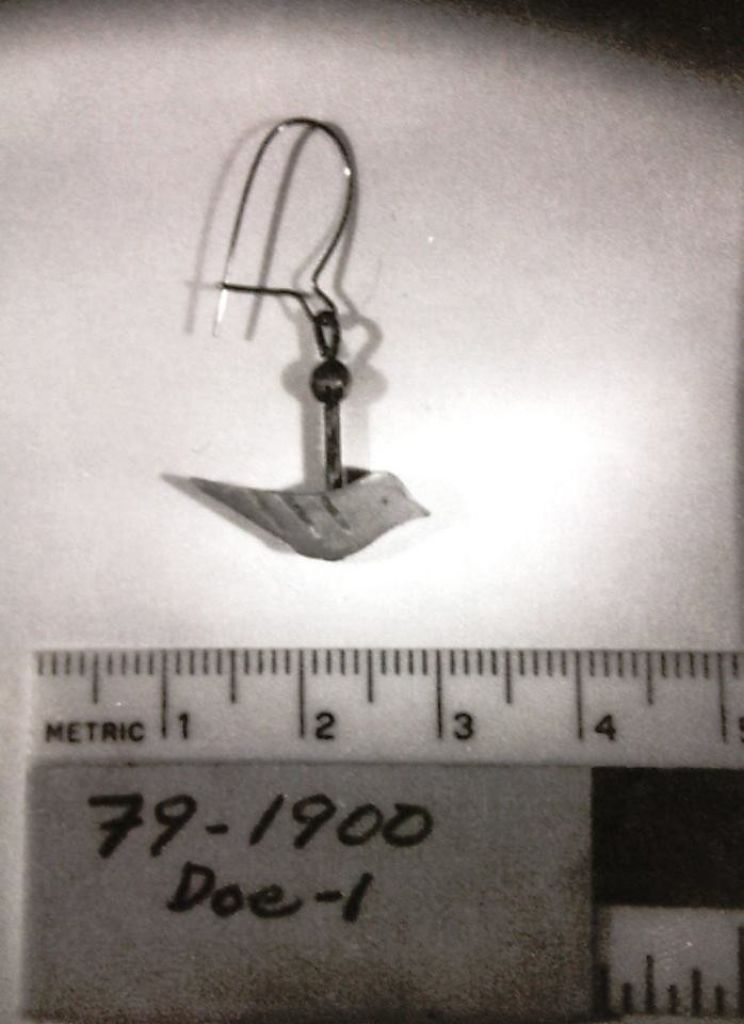
The earring worn by Francine Trimble, subsequently found with her remains

The first victim to have been recovered from the crime scene (later identified as Francine Trimble) was estimated to have been between 5 feet 3 inches (160 cm) and 6 feet 0 inches (180 cm) tall, possibly 5 feet 5 1/2 inches (166 cm) in height. The age of this victim was initially placed as being between 10 and 20 years old—perhaps being no older than 14. Her remains were found with a single earring of a bird, presumed to be handmade and constructed from a shell-like material described as being often seen in the works of "hippies and Native Americans."

The second victim recovered from the crime scene and the subject originally believed to have been a male (later identified as Kerry Graham) was inaccurately estimated to have been between 5 feet 2 inches (157 cm) and 5 feet 11 inches (180 cm) tall, possibly 5 feet 5 inches (170 cm) in height, when in reality, Kerry Graham had been just 4 feet 9 inches (145 cm) in height. The age of this victim was also initially placed as being between 10 and 20 years old—perhaps being no older than 13. (Note: The initial autopsies of the bodies also inaccurately concluded that Graham had likely been younger than her companion, whereas she was actually one year older.) As had been the case with the first body recovered from James Creek, this decedent also had light brown hair, and had received excellent dental care in her lifetime, having never undergone a tooth filling procedure.

Following their initial autopsies, the girls' remains were interred in a cement crypt in the Russian River Cemetery in the city of Ukiah. The decedent assumed to be male was assigned case file number "111UMCA"; the decedent ruled to be female was assigned case file number "131UFCA".

=== Developments ===
By 1985, the remains recovered from James Creek had remained unidentified for six years. The same year, all evidence pertaining to the case was submitted to the FBI to undergo further examination, although the case would largely remain cold for the following fifteen years. Nonetheless, on several occasions between 2000 and 2011, the decedents' remains would be exhumed to undergo further forensic analysis in an effort to determine their identities.

Speculation as to the accuracy of the initial theory of a probable relation between the victims first arose in 2000 when a further examination of the decedents' dental charting revealed dissimilarities too great for the pair to have been biologically related. The initial assumption the victims had been related was first questioned by a forensic odontologist named Jim Wood who, having closely examined the jawbone of each victim, concluded the jaw structure and actual dentition were too dissimilar for the decedents to have been related, and further opined his belief that both victims had most likely been female. This belief that both victims had not been related was formally confirmed via an examination of the victims' mitochondrial DNA the following year, which conclusively determined that the two victims had not been maternally related.

Despite these revelations, speculation remained the decedents may have been in a romantic relationship, which may have been a reason why they were together at the time of their deaths. As no contemporary missing persons reports of a male and a female missing between late 1978 and early 1979 existed in California which matched the physical characteristics of the decedents, theories remained that the pair may have hitchhiked to California, perhaps from as far away as the Midwestern United States, and possibly as runaways. (Note: Although the initial autopsy reports correctly determined the victims had most likely died in December 1978, the autopsy reports concluded the victims were those of a male and a female. As such, investigators did not consider the possibility the decedents may have been Graham and Trimble.)

Three-dimensional reconstructions of the victims, created and released by the National Center for Missing & Exploited Children in 2012. The facial reconstruction of Graham is depicted on the left as a male subject

=== Facial reconstructions ===
Beginning in the 1990s, several forensic facial reconstructions of the decedents were created and released to the media depicting reconstructions of how the two decedents may have physically appeared in life. Initially, these reconstructions had been in the form of clay sculptures created using three-dimensional photographs of the victims' skulls to create forensic models of the physical appearances of their faces. With advances in technology, these clay sculptures would be replaced by digital reconstructions of the decedents—still believed to have been a male and a female—that were released to the media in the early 2000s.

In July 2012, the National Center for Missing & Exploited Children (NCMEC) released updated, digital renderings of the victims' faces. These renditions had been obtained with the assistance of a forensic anthropologist, who—via performing a modern CT scan upon the skulls of the two decedents—had been able to construct a more accurate digital, three-dimensional reconstruction of the victims' faces as they had most likely physically appeared in life. This forensic examination had also narrowed the ages of both victims to being most likely aged between 13- and 15-years-old at the time of their deaths, although the anthropologist did not question the original 1980 conclusion that one of the victims' skulls had been that of a male. (Note: Following the 2015 identification of the victims, the artist who had created the 2012 digital reconstructions of the victims stated that had he known the victim initially believed to have been male was actually female, the facial reconstruction he had created of Graham would have been very similar to the digital reconstruction he had created)

This entire process was covered by the BBC America network, who had paid to have the victims' skeletalized remains exhumed in 2011 in order to produce a documentary detailing ongoing cold case investigations within the United States and worldwide as part of a series they had commissioned titled Naming the Dead. This documentary had detailed just how the NCMEC utilize modern technology, the work of forensic artists, the Internet, and general law enforcement determination in the hopes of identifying unidentified child murder victims, and the methods currently used to do so, with these two decedents intended as being the primary case focused upon within this program within the series. (Note: At the time of the 2012 forensic reconstruction of the victims' faces, a tooth belonging to neither victim was found with their remains. This tooth—the structure of which was described as being "unique" to individuals of Native American or Asian heritage—was also examined. A DNA examination of the tooth confirmed it had belonged to an individual of one of these heritages. Nonetheless, authorities were unsure whether this tooth had belonged to an individual involved in the murders, or if it had been inadvertently placed within evidence storage alongside the victims' remains.)

== Identification ==
All primary sources pertaining to the two decedents had listed Graham's remains as being those of a male until genetic testing conducted in 2014 concluded her remains were actually those of a female. In addition, some contemporary missing persons reports had erroneously listed the date of Graham and Trimble's disappearance as being December 24, 1979, whereas Graham had been reported missing by her mother on December 24, 1978, and Trimble within twenty-four hours of her disappearance. Due to these initial errors, Graham and Trimble had never been listed as possible candidates to be considered as the decedents until these errors had been corrected.

As a result of the renewed publicity and focus on the case following the 2012 screening of the BBC America series highlighting the work of forensic artists at the NCMEC, a sibling of Kerry Graham contacted authorities to voice her concerns that one of the decedents may be her missing sister, adding that at the time of her disappearance, she had been in the company of Francine Trimble. Shortly thereafter, DNA samples were obtained from family members of both girls. These samples were entered into both the National Missing and Unidentified Persons System and the NCMEC DNA databases for comparison with nationwide unsolved murders and unidentified decedents. (Note: DNA samples had been obtained from both decedents by the University of North Texas in 2011, following a further exhumation of their remains resulting from the collaboration between the BBC America network and the National Center for Missing & Exploited Children.)

"We are not satisfied with identification; we are dedicated to finding out what happened."

— Detective Quincy Cromer, addressing the media to announce the formal identifications of Kerry Graham and Francine Trimble. February 2016.

These DNA comparisons later corroborated this sibling's belief. Consequently, thirty-six years after their murders, the two decedents were formally identified as being Kerry Ann Graham and Francine Marie Trimble. Their formal identifications were made in November 2015, and later announced to the media via a February 2016 joint press conference held by the Mendocino and Sonoma County Sheriff's Offices in Mendocino's county seat of Ukiah, and in which both girls' families were informed that the disappearances of Graham and Trimble had never been connected with the remains discovered alongside Highway 20 as police had originally believed the victims had been a young boy and a young girl, and that a likely factor in the original misidentification of one of the bodies as being that of a male was that much of the skeletal structure of young females typically resembles those of males until a female begins to physically mature.

Following this formal announcement, one of the individuals who had worked on the forensic reconstruction of the victims' faces was to state: "It's been such a collaborative effort giving these victims back their names; an identity that has been lost for 30-plus years. It's extraordinary that we were able to help the investigation and these families find answers to their questions. I can't sum up how incredible that is."

The remains of Kerry Graham and Francine Trimble were released to the surviving members of their families in February 2016. At a press conference, one family member stated that although both families had "largely resigned [themselves]" to the fact foul play was an extremely likely reason the girls had disappeared, both families were "glad to know" the girls' bodies had been identified, in order that they could receive a dignified burial by their families.

== Ongoing investigations ==
Mendocino County investigators have stated that although no official suspects have been identified, investigations into the deaths are ongoing, with the case being "as active as it's ever been". Mendocino County Sheriff Tom Allman has also stated that with the identification of the victims, investigators are hoping to obtain more information about the hours leading up to the girls' disappearance in the hopes of capturing the individual or individuals responsible for their deaths and the subsequent concealment of their remains.

"We had resigned ourselves to not knowing where they had disappeared ... she would have been 51 years old this year. It's like we're just learning of her death – like it just happened. I'm very impressed that so many people here cared. We thought it was a forgotten case until [the National Center for Missing & Exploited Children] contacted us for DNA."

— William Walsh. Uncle of Francine Trimble, addressing the media following the formal identifications of Kerry Graham and Francine Trimble. February 2016.

=== Persons of interest ===
The investigation into the murders of Kerry Graham and Francine Trimble remains open and active. In 2000, a man incarcerated at a New Jersey prison falsely confessed to the murders. This false confession had led to the first exhumation of the victims' bodies. This individual was quickly excluded as a suspect in the case after investigators discovered he would have been approximately twelve years old at the time of the murders, in addition to the fact that this individual had "never [even] left New Jersey" in his lifetime. The man is believed to have falsely confessed to the girls' murders after reading about the case in a local newspaper.

Investigators have also stated that they are eager to learn more details surrounding the girls' deaths in order to conclusively prove they were murdered. It is unknown if Graham and Trimble had hitchhiked to the Coddingtown Mall, had ever reached their destination, or even if they had actually intended to visit the Coddingtown Mall on the date of their disappearance. According to a friend of the two girls named Eileen Goetz, she had last seen Graham and Trimble in the grounds of El Molino High School on the date of their disappearance. The two girls had joined Goetz to smoke cigarettes in a parking lot near the school's tennis courts. According to Goetz, neither girl had actually attended school that day, and had informed her (Goetz) of their intentions to hitchhike to a party in Santa Rosa. Both girls had asked Goetz whether she wished to accompany them to the party, but she declined this offer. Another friend would later state that on the date of Graham and Trimble's disappearance, she had seen the two girls hitchhiking near a local Chevron gas station.

Several serial killers such as Rodney Alcala and Gerald and Charlene Gallego have been identified as potential persons of interest in the murders of Graham and Trimble. The speculation of a serial killer as being the perpetrator of this crime was partly conceived due to the number of young females abducted and murdered in California during the late 1970s—some within the same county of the victims' disappearance. A possible connection to the Santa Rosa hitchhiker murders has also been suggested, although the confirmed victims in this case were murdered between 1972 and 1976.

No definitive suspects in the murders of Kerry Graham and Francine Trimble have been officially named.

== See also ==
- Cold case – Unsolved crime not now being investigated
- Crime in California
- DNA profiling – Technique used to identify individuals via DNA characteristics
- List of solved missing person cases: 1950–1999
- List of unsolved murders (1900–1979)
- Santa Rosa hitchhiker murders
- The Doe Network
- Unidentified decedent
