= Franklin Delano Floyd =

American murderer (1943–2023)

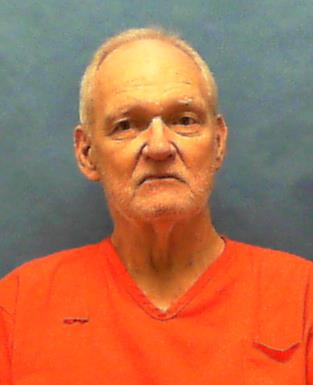
- Born: June 17, 1943; Barnesville, Georgia, U.S.
- Died: January 23, 2023 (aged 79); Union Correctional Institution, Raiford, Florida, U.S.
- Other names: Warren Judson Marshall; Brandon Cleo Williams; Clarence Marcus Hughes; Trenton Davis; Preston Morgan; Kingfish Floyd
- Convictions: Murder of Cheryl Ann Commesso, kidnapping of Michael Anthony Hughes
- Penalty: Death

Details
- Victims: Murdered: 1 confirmed; 2 confessed; 3 suspected; Kidnapped: 2 (both of whom he is either suspected or confessed to have murdered); Raped or sexually abused: 2 (including one of his kidnapping victims)
- Span of crimes: 1960–1994

Franklin Delano Floyd (June 17, 1943 – January 23, 2023) was an American murderer, rapist, child sex offender, and death row inmate. He was convicted of the 1989 murder of Cheryl Ann Commesso, as well as the kidnapping of two-year-old Michael Anthony Hughes, who he claimed was his son. Floyd was also considered a person of interest in the 1990 hit-and-run death of Sharon Marshall, Michael's mother and Floyd's second wife. It was later discovered that before becoming his wife, Sharon had been kidnapped by Floyd as a child and raised as his daughter.

Sharon's true identity remained a mystery until 2014, when she was positively identified as Suzanne Marie Sevakis, the daughter of a woman to whom Floyd was briefly married. Floyd disappeared with Sevakis, her two sisters and infant brother Phillip (also known as "Stevie") while her mother was serving a thirty-day jail sentence in 1975. Sevakis' brother remained missing until 2019 when a man came forward believing he was Phillip; DNA tests confirmed his identity in 2020.

== Early life ==
Franklin Delano Floyd was born in Barnesville, Georgia, the youngest of five children born to Thomas and Della Floyd. Shortly after Floyd's first birthday in 1944, his father, a cotton mill worker and alcoholic, died from kidney and liver failure at age 32. His mother, a widow at age 28, struggled to make a living independently, so she and her children lived in a small apartment with her parents. Over the next year caring for the large family became too difficult for Floyd's grandparents, and by 1946 they asked Della and her children to leave.

Floyd and his siblings were put into the care of Georgia Baptist Children's Home in Hapeville at the advice of the Lamar County child welfare agency. There, Floyd was allegedly bullied by other children for being "feminine" and later reported to have been routinely sexually assaulted by other boys in the home. He was also subjected to harsh punishments by the staff; as a teenager, his hand was dipped into hot water after being caught masturbating. In 1959, having been at the Children's Home two years after his youngest sister left, Floyd ran away and broke into a nearby house to steal food. The Children's Home contacted his sister Dorothy, who was married and living in North Carolina with two children, and told her that criminal charges would not be pursued if she took custody of her brother.

After being kicked out of his sister's home, Floyd traveled to Indianapolis to search for his mother, Della, only to learn that she had become a sex worker. Floyd had Della help him forge legal documents allowing him to go to California to enlist in the United States Army. However, the Army discharged Floyd six months into his service after discovering that he was underage and that his papers were falsified. After being unable to find his mother again, Floyd traveled across the country as a drifter. Della died on July 2, 1968.

== Early criminal history ==
On February 19, 1960, at age 16, Floyd broke into a Sears department store in Inglewood, California, to steal a gun. Police quickly responded to a burglar alarm, resulting in a shootout in which Floyd was shot in the stomach. He survived following emergency surgery. After recovering, he was sent to a youth institution for a year. In 1961, he was arrested for violating his parole by going on a fishing trip in Canada with a friend.

In May 1962, Floyd returned to Hapeville and found a job at Atlanta International Airport. The following month, he abducted a four-year-old from a local bowling alley and sexually assaulted her in the nearby woods. Floyd was convicted of kidnapping and child molestation and was sentenced to serve ten to twenty years at the Georgia State Prison in Reidsville. That November, he was moved to the Milledgeville State Hospital for psychiatric testing.

While being taken out for a medical errand in 1963, Floyd escaped and fled to Macon, where he robbed over $6,000 from a branch of the Citizens & Southern National Bank. He was convicted of the robbery and was sentenced to the Federal Reformatory in Chillicothe, Ohio. After a second escape attempt, he was transferred to the United States Penitentiary in Lewisburg, Pennsylvania. There, he was repeatedly raped by other inmates, causing him to climb a roof at the prison and threaten to commit suicide at one point. After being sent to the federal penitentiary in Marion, Illinois, Floyd was sent back to the Georgia State Prison in 1968 and befriended a fellow inmate named David Dial.

In November 1972, Floyd was released from prison and sent to a halfway house. On January 27, 1973, a week after he was released from the halfway house, he approached a woman at a gas station and forced her into her car, where he attempted to grope and sexually assault her. The woman managed to escape, and Floyd was arrested. Floyd convinced Dial, who had also been released from prison, to post his bond, releasing him from custody until his hearing on June 11, 1973. Floyd did not show up to court, making him a fugitive.

== Relationship with Sandra Brandenburg ==
By 1974, Floyd was using the alias Brandon Williams. While at a North Carolina truck stop, he met Sandra Francis Brandenburg (née Chipman). She was the mother of four children by two different fathers: Suzanne Marie Sevakis (1969–1990), from her first husband Clifford Ray Sevakis, and Allison (b. 1971), Amy (b. 1972), and Philip (nicknamed "Stevie") (b. 1974) Brandenburg from her second husband. Floyd and Brandenburg dated for a month and married, and Floyd convinced Brandenburg to move her family with him to Dallas, Texas. Brandenburg was interviewed in the Netflix documentary Girl In The Picture, in which she stated that she met Floyd in a church. She was crying, and he approached her, asking what was wrong. When she replied that she was at risk of losing her children, Floyd offered to marry her and be the children's father, which she agreed to.

Brandenburg was sentenced to thirty days in jail for passing bad checks in 1975. While she served her time, she left her children in the custody of Floyd. After she was released, she arrived home to find the residence vacated, and her husband and children were gone. Brandenburg eventually found her two middle daughters, Allison and Amy, in the care of a local church-operated social services group. She never found her oldest child, Suzanne, or her youngest child, Philip. She attempted to file kidnapping charges but was told by local authorities that, as their stepfather, Floyd had a right to take the children. The boy's whereabouts remained unknown until 2019 when a man came forward believing he was Philip. DNA tests confirmed his identity.

According to his older sister Allison, their mother had first claimed that Philip was dead. She later learned from Social Services that he was alive and had been privately adopted in North Carolina shortly after he was born.

After the death of his father in March 2019, Steven Patterson would reach out to American author, Matt Birkbeck, for answers about his biological parents. In 2020, a DNA test would confirm that Steve Patterson was the biological son of Brandenburg. Patterson said that he was born and raised in North Carolina with his adoptive father and mother. His mother, Mary, met a pregnant Brandenburg in a hospital after she had just lost a pregnancy. Weeks later, Brandenburg showed up at Mary's door with a baby boy, explaining that she was leaving town with her new husband and three daughters and couldn't take care of a fourth child. Mary recalled seeing Floyd watching as Brandenburg gave Phillip to her. She later renamed Phillip to Steven and raised him with her husband.

As of 2018, Sandra Brandenburg was known as Sandra Willett.

== Death of Suzanne Sevakis ==
Yearbook photo of Suzanne Sevakis, under the alias Sharon Marshall.

Suzanne Sevakis, then living under the alias Sharon Marshall, graduated from Forest Park High School in Forest Park, Georgia, in 1986. Floyd was living under the alias Warren Marshall. Sevakis earned a full scholarship to the Georgia Institute of Technology to study aerospace engineering. Unfortunately, as she told a friend, she was pregnant, and her "father" Warren would not allow her to attend college. She gave birth to a child who was placed for adoption. She and Floyd moved to Tampa, Florida, where she began working as an exotic dancer. Sevakis became pregnant again, giving birth to Michael Anthony Hughes in 1988. She and Floyd were married in 1989 in New Orleans; by then, the two had begun using the aliases Clarence Marcus Hughes and Tonya Dawn Tadlock, with Sevakis becoming Tonya Dawn Hughes on the marriage certificate. It was discovered years later that Sevakis had given birth to a daughter while living in New Orleans. The daughter was placed for adoption. Her name is Megan.

By 1989, Floyd and Sevakis were living in Tulsa, Oklahoma. Sevakis worked as an exotic dancer at a strip club. A fellow dancer, Karen Parsley, encouraged Sevakis to leave the domineering Floyd, only for Sevakis to claim that he would kill her and her son if she tried. Floyd had joined the Fraternal Order of Police, despite not being a police officer, and had told Sevakis that he could use his connections to track her down. However, by April 1990, Sevakis had decided to run away with Kevin Brown, a college student with whom she was having a secret relationship, and take Michael with her.

That month, three passers-by found Sevakis lying on the side of a highway one hundred miles outside of Oklahoma City. As she was found with groceries scattered around her, police surmised she had been struck from behind in a hit-and-run while walking from a convenience store to a nearby Motel 6. She was rushed to the Presbyterian Hospital in Oklahoma City with severe bruises and a large hematoma at the base of her skull. She subsequently died. When Floyd arrived at the hospital the following day, he claimed he had fallen asleep at the Motel 6 after Sevakis had departed to collect the groceries.

At the time of Sevakis' death, she and Floyd were suspects in the 1989 disappearance of 18-year-old Cheryl Ann Commesso, her fellow exotic dancer at the same strip club. Commesso had disappeared following an angry confrontation with Floyd. Floyd was also the lead suspect in Sevakis' death.

== Kidnapping of Michael Anthony Hughes ==
Michael Anthony Hughes

Following Suzanne's death, Floyd put her son Michael into foster care and left the state. Michael's foster parents told authorities the boy had limited muscle control, was non-verbal, and often experienced hysterical behavior when he first arrived at their home, but he had made remarkable progress. In 1994, they began adoption proceedings.

Six months after Michael was placed in foster care, Floyd was arrested on a parole violation. As part of the adoption process, Michael's DNA was compared to Floyd's to establish paternity. At that time, it was determined Floyd was not Michael's biological father. When Floyd was released from jail, he attempted to regain custody of Michael. Based on his criminal record and the discovery that he had no biological relation, his request was denied.

On September 12, 1994, Michael was in the first grade at Indian Meridian Elementary School in Choctaw, Oklahoma. Floyd walked into the school and forced Principal James Davis, at gunpoint, to take him to Michael's classroom. Floyd then forced Michael and Davis into his pickup truck. Floyd forced Davis out of the truck in a wooded area, handcuffed him to a tree, and sped off with Michael. The principal survived the abduction and was rescued.

Two months later, Floyd was arrested in Louisville, Kentucky. Michael was not with him and was never seen again. Authorities received conflicting reports as to what had happened to Michael. Some witness statements detailed alleged confessions by Floyd regarding Michael's death. According to these reports, Floyd reportedly told his sister and others that he drowned the child in a motel bathtub in Georgia shortly after the kidnapping. Another person claimed he saw Floyd bury Michael's body in a cemetery. Still other sources reported that Floyd had stated that Michael was still alive and safe, although Floyd had refused to disclose the boy's exact location or who was caring for him. In a 2014 interview with the FBI, Floyd finally admitted to killing Michael on the same September 1994 day of the kidnapping, shooting him twice in the back of the head.

== Murder of Cheryl Ann Commesso ==
Cheryl Ann Commesso

Commesso's 1989 disappearance remained unsolved until her skeletal remains were found in 1995 by a landscaper in an area off Interstate 275 in Pinellas County, Florida. She was listed as a Jane Doe until a year later, when the remains were identified. An archeologist determined that she died from a beating and two gunshots to the head. Floyd and Suzanne Sevakis had been persons of interest in the case after coworkers witnessed an altercation between Floyd and Commesso. Floyd accused Commesso of reporting Sevakis for misstating her income, resulting in Sevakis losing her government benefits. The argument occurred outside the club where Sevakis and Commesso worked as exotic dancers. A coworker reported that Floyd punched Commesso in the face. Floyd and Sevakis fled to Oklahoma shortly after Commesso disappeared, and their trailer was burned to the ground in what was ruled intentional arson.

In March 1995, a mechanic in Kansas found a large envelope stuffed between the truck bed and the top of the gas tank of a truck he had recently purchased at an auction. He found 97 photographs in the envelope, including many photographs of a woman bound and severely beaten. The police traced the truck to Floyd, who had stolen it in Oklahoma in September 1994 but abandoned it in Texas the following month. Investigators compared the photographs of the injured woman with Commesso, as well as evidence found with her remains, and found that the clothing in the photographs was similar. The medical examiner also compared injuries seen in the photograph to the cheekbone of Commesso's skull and found that they were consistent. Many pictures contained images of furniture and other belongings identified as present in Floyd's intentionally-destroyed trailer. He was tried and convicted for Commesso's murder on the basis of the photographic evidence found in the truck.

== Further investigation ==
Other photos found in the truck show sexual abuse of Sevakis starting very early in her childhood. Authorities found photos of her in sexually explicit poses at various ages, starting around age four.

In September 2014, Floyd admitted to the murder of Michael and that he had disposed of his body on Interstate 35. A search of the area yielded no results, and police believe wild hogs may have eaten Michael's body.

In 2001, while Floyd was awaiting trial for Commesso's murder, Judge Nancy Ley ruled that he was incompetent to stand trial and ordered him to undergo a further mental evaluation. Floyd fought against this assessment, asserting that he was competent. Several months later, the judge reversed her previous ruling and ordered Floyd to stand trial. He was convicted of first degree murder and sentenced to death.

== A Beautiful Child and Finding Sharon ==
The book A Beautiful Child by investigative journalist Matt Birkbeck was published in 2004. It brought the story of Franklin Floyd and Sharon Marshall, whose real identity was still unknown, to light and led to the discovery of the daughter placed for adoption in 1989. Worldwide interest in finding Sharon's true identity generated by the book eventually led the National Center for Missing and Exploited Children and FBI to revive the case in 2011. In 2014, two FBI agents interviewed Franklin Floyd, who confessed to killing Michael Hughes and divulged Sharon's true identity, Suzanne Sevakis.

The 2018 memoir Finding Sharon, also written by Matt Birkbeck, tells the story of the events that transpired following the publication of A Beautiful Child and how they led to finding Sharon's true identity.

== Girl in the Picture ==
Girl in the Picture is a Netflix original documentary about the Sharon Marshall/Franklin Floyd saga that first aired in July 2022. It is directed by Skye Borgman and based on the books A Beautiful Child and Finding Sharon by Matt Birkbeck, who is also the executive producer. Girl in the Picture featured interviews with many of the participants in the story, including the biological parents of Suzanne Sevakis. The critically acclaimed film was an instant hit and was Netflix's number one movie worldwide for several weeks. It received a 96% rating on Rotten Tomatoes.

== Death ==
Floyd died from natural causes while on death row on January 23, 2023, at the age of 79.

== See also ==
- List of kidnappings
