= Matt Birkbeck =

American journalist and author

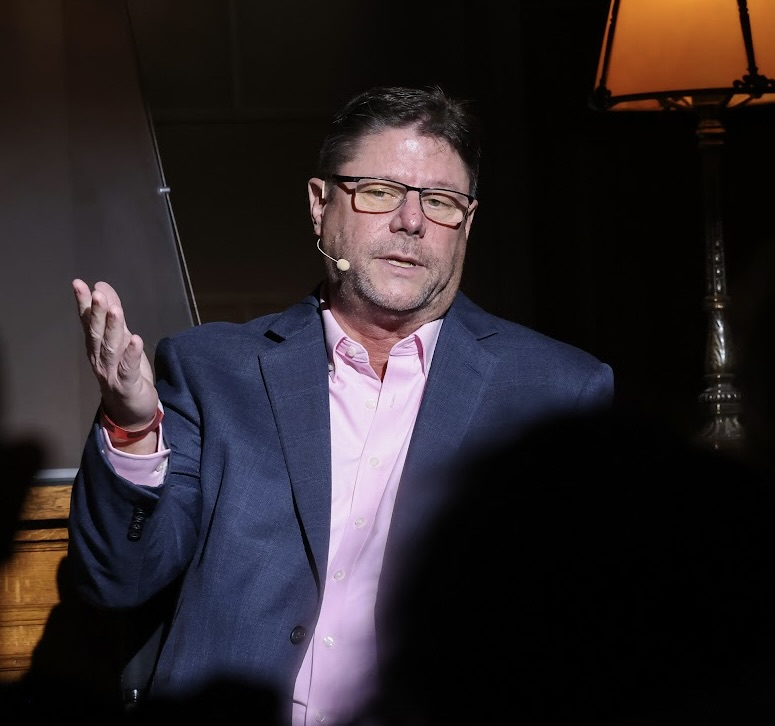
Matt Birkbeck in Las Vegas, 2023

Matt Birkbeck (born Brooklyn, N.Y.) is an American investigative journalist and author.

He is best known for several of his books, including A Beautiful Child, which told the horrifying, haunting and tragic story of "Sharon Marshall," who was abducted as a toddler and raised under false identities by her "father" Franklin Delano Floyd, a convicted felon. A bestseller, the book is considered a true crime masterpiece.

He also wrote the sequel Finding Sharon, which is a memoir about his ten-year effort, along with the FBI and National Center for Missing & Exploited Children, to find Sharon's true identity, Suzanne Sevakis. The books captivated readers worldwide and were adapted by Netflix for the film Girl in the Picture, which was released in 2022 and became a global phenomenon earning the #1 movie ranking worldwide. It was directed by Skye Borgman, with Birkbeck serving as executive producer.

He also wrote Deconstructing Sammy, a true story about an investigation into the life of Sammy Davis Jr. to resolve his debts and his legacy following his death in 1990. The book received critical acclaim, with The New York Times saying "Birkbeck has killer leads, gripping kickers and sensational descriptions" while the Los Angeles Times said "Birkbeck tells the epic of Sammy Davis, Jr."

His 2023 book The Life We Chose told the story of William D'Elia, the former head of the Bufalino Crime Family and the so-called son and confidant to former Mafia boss Russell Bufalino. Birkbeck interviewed D'Elia for over two years and reported on his associations with Jimmy Hoffa, Roy Cohn, Frank Sheeran, Marlon Brando and Donald Trump, among others. The bestselling book reached several #1 rankings on Amazon.

His other notable books include The Quiet Don: The Untold Story of Mafia Kingpin Russell Bufalino (2014), his biography of Russell Bufalino, the powerful and influential Mafia boss, and his very first book A Deadly Secret (2002/2015), which is a comprehensive account of real estate heir Robert Durst and the mysterious disappearance of his wife Kathie Durst in 1982, and subsequent murder of a drifter, Morris Black, in Galveston, Texas in 2001. The book drew on extensive interviews, police files, and firsthand reporting, cementing Birkbeck’s reputation for deep investigative work. Birkbeck's reporting on Durst served as a roadmap for law enforcement and other media, with Dateline NBC following up on his reporting connecting Durst to the disappearances of several other women. That program, Robert Durst: The Lost Years (Season 23, Episode 62), aired in June 2015. The book was adapted by Lifetime for the 2017 movie The Lost Wife of Robert Durst.

His debut work of fiction, The Wicked, was published in August 2025 to favorable reviews.

Birkbeck has had bylines in a variety of publications. He covered the aftermath of the 2004 Super Bowl riots for Boston Magazine, the cross-country pursuit of a civil rights worker by white supremacists for the Philadelphia Inquirer, features for The New York Times, the Robert Durst investigation for Reader's Digest and People magazine, the U.S. Secret Service and FBI investigation of baseball legend Denny McLain for Playboy, and others.

== Career ==
Birkbeck worked as a newspaper reporter first at the Pocono Record, where he won an Investigative Reporters and Editors award for his series on housing fraud in 2002. He then joined The Morning Call where he covered the federal courts in the Eastern District of Pennsylvania in Philadelphia and Allentown and wrote investigative stories. His lengthy reporting from 2004 to 2010 on Pennsylvania's casino initiative exposed political corruption at the highest levels of state government, including then-Governor Ed Rendell and the state Supreme Court. In 2009 Birkbeck was subpoenaed to testify before a special prosecutor appointed by the Pennsylvania Supreme Court to investigate alleged leaks in the prosecution of a businessman with alleged mob ties who was awarded a license to operate a casino. Birkbeck's reporting on the case served as the basis of his bestselling book The Quiet Don.

He also served as a correspondent for People magazine from 1998 to 2004 covering mostly crime and human interest stories including the 1999 death of John F. Kennedy Jr., and the Robert Durst investigation. His reporting on the Durst case led to the publication of his first book A Deadly Secret, which subsequently served as the roadmap for law enforcement in their pursuit of Durst. Following Durst's arrest in 2015, police found two copies of A Deadly Secret inside Durst's Houston condo.

Birkbeck joined niche business publisher Harrison Scott Publications in Hoboken, N.J. in 2010. HSP was sold to Green Street in 2020.

== Books ==
- A Deadly Secret: The Strange Disappearance of Kathie Durst (Berkley/Penguin 2002). The definitive account of real estate heir Robert Durst and the 1982 disappearance of his wife Kathie. Two copies of the book were discovered in Durst's Houston apartment at the time of his 2015 arrest.
- A Beautiful Child (Berkley/Penguin 2004). The harrowing, haunting saga documenting the kidnapping and false identities of a young woman known as "Sharon Marshall" and her abductor Franklin Delano Floyd. Widely considered Birkbeck's masterwork.
- Till Death Do Us Part: Love, Marriage and the Mind of the Killer Spouse (with psychotherapist Dr. Robi Ludwig) Atria/Simon & Schuster 2006.
- Deconstructing Sammy: Music, Money, Madness, and the Mob Amistad/HarperCollins 2008. An equal-parts cultural history and investigative biography examining how Sammy Davis, Jr., one of Hollywood's biggest stars, left behind a chaotic financial and personal legacy.
- The Quiet Don: The Untold Story of Mafia Kingpin Russell Bufalino Berkley/Penguin 2013. A bestseller that details the life of Russell Bufalino, among the most powerful and notorious organized crime leaders in the U.S.
- A Deadly Secret: The Bizarre and Chilling Story of Robert Durst Berkley/PenguinRandomHouse 2015.
- Finding Sharon Summerville 2018. The sequel to A Beautiful Child detailing the discovery of Sharon Marshall's true identity, Suzanne Sevakis.
- The Life We Chose: William "Big Billy" D'Elia and the Last Secrets of America's Most Powerful Mafia Family William Morrow/HarperCollins July 2023. A revelatory portrait of William "Big Billy" D'Elia, the last head of the Bufalino crime family, touching on his life with family namesake Russell Bufalino along with Jimmy Hoffa, Roy Cohn, Frank Sheeran, Marlon Brando, and Donald Trump, among others.
- The Wicked Summerville August 2025. Birkbeck's debut work of fiction.

== Film adaptations ==
Girl in the Picture debuted on Netflix on July 6, 2022, and is based on A Beautiful Child and Finding Sharon. It was directed by Skye Borgman, with Birkbeck serving as executive producer. A day after its release, it was Netflix's number one movie in the world, and remained there for several weeks.

A Deadly Secret was adapted by Lifetime in 2017 for the movie The Lost Wife of Robert Durst. It starred Katharine McPhee as Kathie Durst and Daniel Gillies as Robert Durst.

Deconstructing Sammy was optioned for a feature film, documentary and scripted TV series by Byron Allen for his Entertainment Studios in 2015.

== Awards ==
Birkbeck received an Investigative Reporters and Editors Award in San Francisco in 2002 for his groundbreaking stories on mortgage fraud in the U.S. He wrote a multi-part investigative series A Price Too High in 2001 that exposed how home builders, appraisers, mortgage companies and major banks conspired to defraud thousands of homebuyers, mostly minorities from the New York area, and forced them into bankruptcy and foreclosure. His reporting spurred numerous state, local and federal investigations, as well as Congressional hearings. The New York Times followed up his reporting with a lengthy feature in April 2004. Birkbeck and the Pocono Record were sued for libel by a home builder in 2003, and the case went to trial in Monroe County, Pa. in 2010 before a jury, which ruled in favor of Birkbeck and the newspaper.
