= The Mendocino Voice =

- Type: Online newspaper
- Founder(s): Adrian Fernandez Baumann; Kate Maxwell
- Publisher: Katherine Ann Rowlands
- Editor: Lin Due
- Founded: 2016; 10 years ago
- Headquarters: Willits, California, United States
- Website: mendovoice.com

The Mendocino Voice is an daily online newspaper based in and covering Mendocino County, in Northern California.

== History ==
The Mendocino Voice was founded in September 2016 by two former employees of The Willits News, a newspaper owned by Digital First Media. The founders, Adrian Fernandez Baumann and Kate Maxwell, cited a lack of local news stemming from the acquisition of small northern California newspapers by DFM and its control by Alden Global Capital, as reasons for starting a new local news service.

In the late 2010s The Mendocino Voice became among the most read in Mendocino County, and was cited by The Sacramento Bee, The New York Times and the Los Angeles Times, and featured on the BBC and KQED. In 2019, The Mendocino Voice was selected, jointly with KZYX, to host a Report for America fellow.

The news service is part of a trend in the 2010s towards small, wholly online news services, that have abandoned print publication. As with many such publications it is a member of the Local Independent Online News Publishers group.

== Content ==
The Mendocino Voice is known for coverage of local issues and of the Northern California cannabis industry. Also of note was its coverage of the Wine Country Fires, and the Mendocino Complex Fire.
