= O28 =

O28 may refer to:

- Oxygen-28, an isotope of oxygen
- Vought O-28 Corsair, a prototype observation aircraft of the United States Army Air Corps
- Willits Municipal Airport, in Mendocino County, California, United States
