= Unknown Number: The High School Catfish =

2025 documentary film

- Release poster
- Directed by: Skye Borgman
- Produced by: Ross M. Dinerstein; Rebecca Evans
- Cinematography: Bryan Gosline
- Edited by: Hans Ole Eicker
- Music by: Ian Hultquist
- Production companies: Campfire Studios; Terminal B TV
- Distributed by: Netflix
- Release date: 29 August 2025
- Running time: 94 minutes
- Country: United States
- Language: English

Unknown Number: The High School Catfish is an American true crime documentary film directed by Skye Borgman and released to streaming on Netflix on August 29, 2025.

The documentary explores the events and investigation into an unknown person cyberbullying and harassing teenagers in Beal City, Michigan using an unknown number via insults and sexual claims. It also explores the increasingly great impact of the harassment on the community, the eventual reveal of the culprit, and the trial that followed.

== Summary ==
Unknown Number tells the true story of American teenager Lauryn Licari and her then-boyfriend Owen McKenny, who began receiving harassing text messages from an unknown number in October 2020. The messages stopped, but began again persistently in September 2021 for over 15 months. The content of the messages was threatening, insulting, and bullying, with particular aim at Lauryn's appearance, as well as expressing a sexual interest in Owen. Lauryn and Owen's parents and school staff were concerned for their safety and reported the text messages to the police. An investigation was led by the Isabella County Sheriff, with support from police officers from Beal City and the FBI. The IP address for the phone number was eventually discovered, revealing the perpetrator to be Kendra Licari, Lauryn's mother, whose subsequent trial is also explored by the film.

== Cast and crew ==
Lauryn Licari and Owen McKenny were interviewed for the film, as well as their respective parents. Lauryn and Owen's high school friends were also interviewed, as well as some of the friends' parents. The principal of their high school, Dan Boyer, was featured and interviews with the Sheriff, Mike Main, and FBI Liaison, Bradley Peter, were also included.

=== Crew ===
Role	Crew
Executive producer	Skye Borgman, Tom Forman, Ross Girard, Alysia Sofios, Justin Sprague, Ariane Wu
Co-executive producer	Kasey Han, Will Mavronicolas, Mark McCune, Lindsey Savino
Producer	Ross M. Dinerstein, Rebecca Evans
Co-producer	Kaley Roberts
Composer	Ian Hultquist
Cinematographer	Bryan Gosline
Editor	Hans Ole Eicker
Casting director	Paul Sinacore

== Reception ==
=== Viewership ===
In its first week of release, Unknown Number reached Netflix's Top 10 films globally.

=== Critical response ===
On the review aggregator website Rotten Tomatoes, 85% of 13 critics' reviews are positive.

In Review Online was critical of the film's approach to the subject matter, writing "where is the line between examining human evil and exploiting child victims in order to satiate our culture's voyeuristic thirst for true crime entertainment? In Unknown Number, that line not only feels crossed, but it seems like we have plunged headlong down a dark abyss we never should have entered".

Decider recommended streaming the film and in a positive review said "it's enjoyable to try and unravel". The Guardian wrote that "this film is yet another remarkable and chilling cautionary tale of the digital age". TechRadar was positive about the film describing it as "incredibly disturbing" and encouraged viewers to "binge immediately".
