= The Truth About Jim =

2024 American TV documentary series

- Release poster
- Directed by: Skye Borgman
- Music by: Jimmy Stofer
- Country of origin: United States
- Original language: English
- No. of episodes: 4

Production
- Executive producers: Skye Borgman; Brian Grazer; Ron Howard; Sara Bernstein; Justin Wilkes; Igal Svet; Jonathan Goldman; Brent Henderson; Meredith Kaulfers; Liz Massie; Joseph Boyle
- Producer: Dani Sloane
- Running time: 45-50 minutes
- Production companies: Investigation Discovery; Imagine Documentaries; Freak Magnet

Original release
- Network: Max
- Release: February 15, 2024

The Truth About Jim is an American documentary television series, directed and produced by Skye Borgman. It follows a young woman as she investigates whether her step-grandfather, Jim Mordecai, was a serial killer. It was released on February 15, 2024, on Max.

== Premise ==
Sierra Barter confronts generations of trauma and secrets to investigate whether her step-grandfather Jim Mordecai was a serial killer who committed the Santa Rosa hitchhiker murders.

== Episodes ==
| No. | Title | Directed by | Original release date |
|---|---|---|---|
| 1 | "Bringing Up The Past" | Skye Borgman | February 15, 2024 |
| 2 | "Eight Murdered Girls" | Skye Borgman | February 15, 2024 |
| 3 | "The Devil and Jim Mordecai" | Skye Borgman | February 15, 2024 |
| 4 | "Out of the Shadows" | Skye Borgman | February 15, 2024 |

== Production ==
In February 2023, it was announced Skye Borgman would direct a documentary series for Discovery+. Ron Howard, Brian Grazer, Justin Wilkes, Sara Bernstein and Meredith Kaulfers served as executive producers under their Imagine Documentaries banner.

== Reception ==
=== Critical reception ===
Nick Schager of The Daily Beast wrote: "The Truth About Jim falls a bit flat with its ultimate (lack of) revelations. In their place, it refocuses its attention on the therapeutic nature of Sierra's mission. Bringing together estranged mothers, children and siblings to air grievances, forgive, and face harrowing realities, Borgman's latest does its best to make itself less about its title subject than about the strong, courageous and united individuals who survived years of his cruelty." Chris Vognar of Rolling Stone wrote: "The series never really delves into a subtext that lingers around the edges: obsession, and what it can do to the obsessed. Barter is cast as the noble truth-seeker, which is fair enough. But a more complicated and potentially richer portrait could have gotten inside her head and explored what it feels like to be someone who turns a wall into a crime corkboard and tracks down a Zodiac Killer expert in San Francisco."

Daniel Kurland of Bloody Disgusting gave the series a three out of five stars, writing: "The Truth About Jim has good intentions and charts curious ground through its possible familial connection to a notorious serial killer. Not everything in this curious case study works and it sometimes feels as if it gets lost in the weeds. However, when it connects, it's powerful storytelling that proves that there's so much more to an investigation than simply results and proof."
