= Girl in the Picture =

2022 documentary by Skye Borgman

- Release poster
- Directed by: Skye Borgman
- Produced by: Matt Birkbeck; Skye Borgman; Emily Bon; Jimmy Fox; Dani Sloane
- Cinematography: Arlene Nelson
- Edited by: Fernanda Tornaghi; Edward Wardrip
- Music by: Jimmy Stofer
- Production company: All3Media America
- Distributed by: Netflix
- Release date: July 6, 2022
- Country: United States
- Language: English

Girl in the Picture is an American Netflix original documentary film directed by Skye Borgman. It is based on the books A Beautiful Child and Finding Sharon by Matt Birkbeck, who also served as executive producer. The film was released on July 6, 2022.

== Summary ==
The story is centered on a young girl known as Sharon Marshall, who was abducted by a federal fugitive Franklin Delano Floyd and then raised as his daughter. Over the course of the next two decades, she was sexually assaulted by Floyd, forced to marry him and ultimately died in a suspicious hit-and-run accident in 1990. The film follows the shocking events that transpired afterward and the years-long efforts by Birkbeck, the National Center for Missing & Exploited Children, and the FBI to find her true identity.

== Reception ==
=== Viewership ===
Upon its release, Girl In The Picture remained the number one movie on Netflix for several weeks.

=== Critical response ===
On the review aggregator website Rotten Tomatoes, 96% of 24 critics' reviews are positive, with an average rating of 7.6/10.

== See also ==
- Abducted in Plain Sight
- Into the Fire: The Lost Daughter
