= Deconstructing Sammy =

Book by Matt Birkbeck

- Author: Matt Birkbeck
- Subject: Sammy Davis Jr.
- Genre: Biography
- Publisher: Amistad/HarperCollins
- Publication date: September 2008

Deconstructing Sammy is a book by author Matt Birkbeck about the life and death of Sammy Davis Jr. and the subsequent efforts to restore his legacy. Published in September 2008 by Amistad/HarperCollins the book follows the efforts of a Pennsylvania lawyer and former Assistant U.S. Attorney, Albert "Sonny" Murray Jr., who was hired in 1994 by Sammy's poverty-stricken wife Altovise to help resolve Sammy's debts. Upon his death from cancer in 1990, Sammy Davis Jr. owed over $15 million, of which $7 million was owed to the Internal Revenue Service. Murray spent seven years representing the Davis estate, from 1994 to 2001, during which time he resolved the debts, restored Sammy's legacy and earned Sammy a posthumous Grammy Award in 2001. Deconstructing Sammy reveals Sammy Davis Jr. as a brilliant yet tragic figure in American culture.

The New York Times in a December 2008 review hailed the book as "Gripping" and "Sensational." The Los Angeles Times called Deconstructing Sammy "Epic" and "Tremendous" in a November 2008 review, while the Tennessee Tribune described the book as "stunning" in a November 2008 review.

The paperback version was published in September 2009.
