= Dead Asleep =

2021 film directed by Skye Borgman

- Directed by: Skye Borgman
- Produced by: Sandrine Magloire-Szlasa
- Release date: December 16, 2021
- Running time: 90 minutes
- Country: United States

Dead Asleep is a 2021 American documentary true crime film produced for Hulu by Pulse Films. The film was directed by American documentarian Skye Borgman.

== Content ==
Dead Asleep follows the case of Randy Herman Jr., who was convicted in 2019 of murdering his childhood friend and roommate Brooke Preston. The documentary investigates Herman's claim that he was sleepwalking during the murder and therefore innocent.

== Criticism ==
On November 29, 2021, Brooke's sister Jordan uploaded a video to TikTok in which she stated that Dead Asleep and Hulu were forcing her and her family to relive the worst days of their lives. The Preston family refused to be interviewed for, participate in, or give consent to the making of the documentary.

The film has been criticized by Brooke's family and friends for being biased in favor of Herman. As of January 5, 2022, over 100,000 have signed a petition demanding Hulu remove the film from streaming.

Critic Natalia Keogan of Paste magazine further criticized the film as part of a cheap and profitable buy in by Hulu into the true crime genre, citing the "incessant churning out of half-baked documentaries that serve little purpose outside of boasting exclusive access to the families of perpetrators and victims alike." She further noted that "Dead Asleep offers absolutely no resolution—it's up to the viewer to discern whether or not they buy Herman's story—an irresponsible way of framing the case, as it omits the perspective of Brooke's family entirely."

== See also ==
- True crime § Criticism
