= Ukiah Daily Journal =

American daily newspaper in Mendocino County, California

- Type: Weekly newspaper
- Format: Broadsheet
- Owner(s): MediaNews Group, Inc
- Founder: J.A. Vanness
- Editor: K.C Meadows
- Deputy editor: Jody Martinez
- Founded: 1863 (as Constitutional Democrat)
- Language: English
- Headquarters: Ukiah, California
- Circulation: 6,795
- Sister newspapers: The Willits News
- OCLC number: 28464153
- Website: ukiahdailyjournal.com

The Ukiah Daily Journal is an American daily paid newspaper which serves the city of Ukiah and surrounding Mendocino County, California. Published daily Tuesday through Sunday, its estimated circulation is 6,795. Saturday editions ran from 2003, making it a true daily newspaper until 2011. It now runs on a Tuesday-Sunday publication schedule. It is edited by K. C. Meadows.

== History ==
In August 1863, the Constitutional Democrat was founded in Mendocino, California. Its first editor was J.A. Vanness. He was succeeded a few months later by William Holden. The paper was pro-Secession, pro-Confederacy and White Supremacist. The next men to take on the role of editor at the paper, which was later renamed to the Mendocino Democrat, were Matthew Lynch in February 1865, L.W. Boggs (formerly of the Healdsburg Standard) in January 1869, Alexander Dunn at some point followed by Alexander Montgomery (formerly of the Martinez Express) in September 1870.

Earlier that year in February 1870, Matthew Lynch founded the Independent Dispatch in Mendocino. In 1873, it was reported Lynch and Montgomery were each running to be the Democratic nominee for the county's assemblyman in April 1873. Both later denied this news. Matthew Lynch relocated his paper from Mendocino to Ukiah in October 1873. He died in February 1874.

His widow, Belle Lynch, then ran the Dispatch. She was possibly California's first woman newspaper editor and an early crusader for women's rights. She advocated for better treatment of the Indigenous peoples of California and for better schools. She feuded with Thomas Carothers, the county district attorney, after accusing him of improprieties in the handling of an estate. Carothers had Belle Lynch arrested five times for criminal libel, but she was never tried or convicted. On Oct. 20, 1877, Carothers held bystanders at gunpoint while attacking Belle Lynch outside the Grand Hotel on Ukiah's main street. He was tried for assault but the case ended with a Hung jury. Belle Lynch left town a year later. It was rumored she would sell her paper to her bitter rival Montgomery, owner of the Democrat. Instead, she sold the Dispatch to Gambee & Hoffman.

In 1880, the Dispatch was purchased by H.A. Peabody and A.W. Sefton. It was then relaunched as The Democratic Dispatch. The improved paper proved so successful it helped put Montgomery out of business and the Democrat ceased a month later in April 1881. Peabody and Sefton bought the Democrat's assets and their paper was renamed to the Democratic Dispatch and Mendocino Democrat. Peabody sold the Dispatch-Democrat to John "Jack" Buckingham in November 1889, and he operated the paper until his death in July 1896. His widow Minne W. Buckingham published the paper for over a year until selling it to J. B. Sanford. In 1913, Sanford took on partner E. P. Thurston, who managed many of the paper's day-to-day operations. Thurston would edit and publish the paper for 36 years,

In 1929, Sam Ray founded the Redwood Journal in Ukriah. A few months later Ben A. Cober took an interest in the business. Cober became the sole owner in February 1931. Ray later sued Cober for a missing payment, who in return counter-sued him for mismanagement and fraud. Cober won and was awarded $3,016 (equivalent to $71,170 in 2025). In 1937, Thurston and Sanford's widow sold the Dispatch-Democrat to Cober in 1937. He kept the papers separate until merging the two together in 1948 to form the Redwood Journal and Dispatch-Democrat. A year later Cober bought the Ukiah Republican Press and merged it with his paper to form the Redwood Journal-Press-Dispatch. The name was changed to the Ukriah Daily Journal in 1954.

In October 1960, Cober and Robert F. Gerber, owner of The Willits News, merged their businesses together but kept the papers separate. It was an effort to reduce costs through consolidation. In 1968, the News and Journal were sold by Cober and Gerber to the newly formed Mendocino Publishing Company, with Malcolm D. Glover, of Ventura, as its president. At the time, the weekly News had a 2,000 circulation and the daily Journal had a 5,000 circulation. In 1973, Glover sold the News to a group of Willits residents. In 1977, a rival paper called the Mendocino Grapevine sued Glover for $2 million, alleging he had created a printing monopoly. Around that time Glover fired Dean DeVries, the paper's publisher and a minority stockholder. DeVries then sued Glover for $1.5 million.

In 1984, Donrey Media Group bought the paper from the Mendocino Publishing Co. In 1988, after the Anderson Valley Advertiser printed a hoax interview (supposedly with Congressman Douglas Bosco), the Ukiah Daily Journal, which had had the printing contract for that paper, banned the use of its press by the Advertiser. In 1999, MediaNews Group bought the paper as part of a ten newspaper deal with Donrey meant to expand MediaNews's holdings in Los Angeles and Northern California. MediaNews Group is a subsidiary of Alden Global Capital.

== Recognition ==
In 2017, the Ukiah Daily Journal won 1st place in the Coverage of Local Government category in its division of California's Better Newspapers Contest.
