= Willits Municipal Airport =

Willits Municipal Airport Ells Field
- IATA: none; ICAO: none; FAA LID: O28

Summary
- Airport type: Public
- Operator: City of Willits
- Location: Willits, California
- Elevation AMSL: 2,066 ft / 630 m
- Coordinates: 39°27′05″N 123°22′20″W
- Interactive map of Willits Municipal Airport

Runways
Direction	Length		Surface
Direction	ft	m	Surface
16/34	2,705	824	Asphalt

Willits Municipal Airport (FAA LID: O28), also known as Ells Field, is a public airport located three miles (4.6 km) northwest of Willits, serving Mendocino County, California, USA. This general aviation airport covers 75 acres and has one runway.
