= A Beautiful Child =

2004 book by Matt Birkbeck

- Author: Matt Birkbeck
- Publisher: Berkley/Penguin
- Publication date: 2004
- ISBN: 978-0425204405

A Beautiful Child (ISBN 978-0425204405) is a best selling non-fiction book by author Matt Birkbeck, published by Berkley/Penguin in 2004 and in paperback in 2005. It tells the story of a young woman known by many names, including Sharon Marshall, who was kidnapped as a toddler and raised by a convicted felon, Franklin Delano Floyd. The book was also published in several foreign countries, including Denmark, Germany and Poland. A Beautiful Child spurred numerous websites dedicated to finding Sharon's true identity. Through suggestions from those sites along with reader suggestions from around the world, Birkbeck, in partnership with the National Center for Missing and Exploited Children, conducted DNA testing on relatives of several girls who went missing in the early 1970s. World-wide interest in the book kept the Sharon Marshall story alive and led to the discovery by Birkbeck of her biological daughter, who had been placed for adoption in 1989. Sharon's DNA was believed to have been degraded, but testing comparisons to her daughter provided a positive match and her DNA was placed into CODIS, the FBI's database.

The continued interest in the book led the NCMEC to reopen its investigation in 2011. The NCMEC then recruited the FBI in Oklahoma City and two agents, using the book and other resources as their guides, interviewed Franklin Floyd in prison in Florida, where he provided Sharon's true identity.

In July 2014, the DNA testing positively identified Sharon as Suzanne Sevakis, the daughter of a woman Floyd briefly married in the mid-1970s. Floyd kidnapped Suzanne and her siblings when their mother was incarcerated for 30 days. Suzanne's son, Michael, after being kidnapped from his elementary school by Floyd in 1994, has never been located, but Floyd admitted during the FBI interviews that he killed him shortly after the kidnapping.

== Sequel ==
Finding Sharon (ISBN 978-1732491717) is the sequel to A Beautiful Child published in 2018 that tells the story of the ten-year effort by the author Matt Birkbeck, the National Center for Missing and Exploited Children and the FBI to learn the true identity of Sharon Marshall and the fate of her son Michael Hughes.
