= The Willits News =

- Type: Twice weekly newspaper
- Owner: Digital First Media
- Editor: Aura Whittaker
- Founded: 1892; 134 years ago
- Language: English
- City: Willits, California
- Country: United States
- Sister newspapers: Ukiah Daily Journal
- OCLC number: 35303427
- Website: willitsnews.com

The Willits News is a twice weekly newspaper covering Willits, California and northern Mendocino County. It has been reporting on the community since 1892. It operates out of the offices of the Ukiah Daily Journal.

== History ==
The Willits News was founded in March 1892. It was owned by L. Kentworthy along with H.F. and A.L. Finnell. Kentworthy served as its first editor and manager. By June, editor Mast was the owner. The paper ceased that October. It was relaunched by Weeks & Curtis in March 1893. Five years later a fire entirely destroyed several buildings in Willits including the paper's office.

In December 1904, Fred N. Loring moved to Mendocino County and started a weekly paper in Covelo called the Covelo Review. He had previously operated the Bee in Lakeport. In March 1905, W. A. Roberts took charge of the News as manager and editor, succeeding James E. Nugent. Later that year Parker Hall bought Harry McElroy's interest in the business. Dr. Litftchild owned the News for several months In 1907 before agreeing to sell it to Charles G. Halliday, who then planned to move it to the county seat of Ukiah. After Halliday suffered a severe attack of rheumatism, Litftchild instead sold the paper to Loring, who then merged the Review into the News and moved to Willitis to operate the paper.

At some point Bernard Moore bought a half-interest but sold it back to Loring in 1915. In 1922, Loring sold the paper to Harry Elliott. Loring later returned to the paper as editor in November 1927. A few months later it was reported Loring reacquired the News. A month later Loring told the Ukiah Dispatch Democrat that Elliott sold the paper to Ms. Amy Requa Long, with Edward Morris as editor and C.H. Hammond as business manager.

Albert "Bert" C. Hammond bought the paper in 1928. Loring returned to the paper again in 1936 to work for Hammond as editor. Hammond broke his arm in a fall a few years later. He sold the News in November 1947 to Troy L. Maness. Hammond died a year later. In April 1959, Robert F. Gerber, owner of the Ukiah News, Noyo News and Paul Bunyan News in Fort Bragg, purchased the Willits News from Troy Maness and Lee Kentworthy. The Noyo News was absorbed into the Willits News and Joseph C. Murphy was hired as editor. In October 1960, Gerber and Ben A. Cober, owner of the Ukiah Daily Journal, merged their businesses together but kept the papers separate. It was an effort to reduce costs through consolidation.

In April 1968, the paper's editor Paul Alan Davis was hospitalized after his pickup truck crashed and flipped over several times. A month later the News and the Journal were sold by Cober and Gerber to the newly formed Mendocino Publishing Company, with Malcolm D. Glover, of Ventura, as its president. At the time the weekly News had a 2,000 circulation and the daily Journal had a 5,000 circulation. In 1973, Glover sold the News to a group of Willits residents who formed The Willits News, Inc., with Albert B. Canepa as its president. The sale price was $74,244. A year later the new owners sued Glover for $25,000 in punitive damages for violating an agreement for the Journal to not solicit ad sales in Willits.

In 1994, Times Publishing Company, owner of the Erie Times-News, acquired the News and laid off all 20 employees. In 2001, the company sold the paper, along with the Lake County Record-Bee and Clear Lake Observer-American, to the California Newspaper Partnership, managed by the MediaNews Group. The new owners also published the nearby Ukiah Daily Journal. MediaNews Group is a subsidiary of Alden Global Capital.
