= Willits, California =

City in California, United States

- City
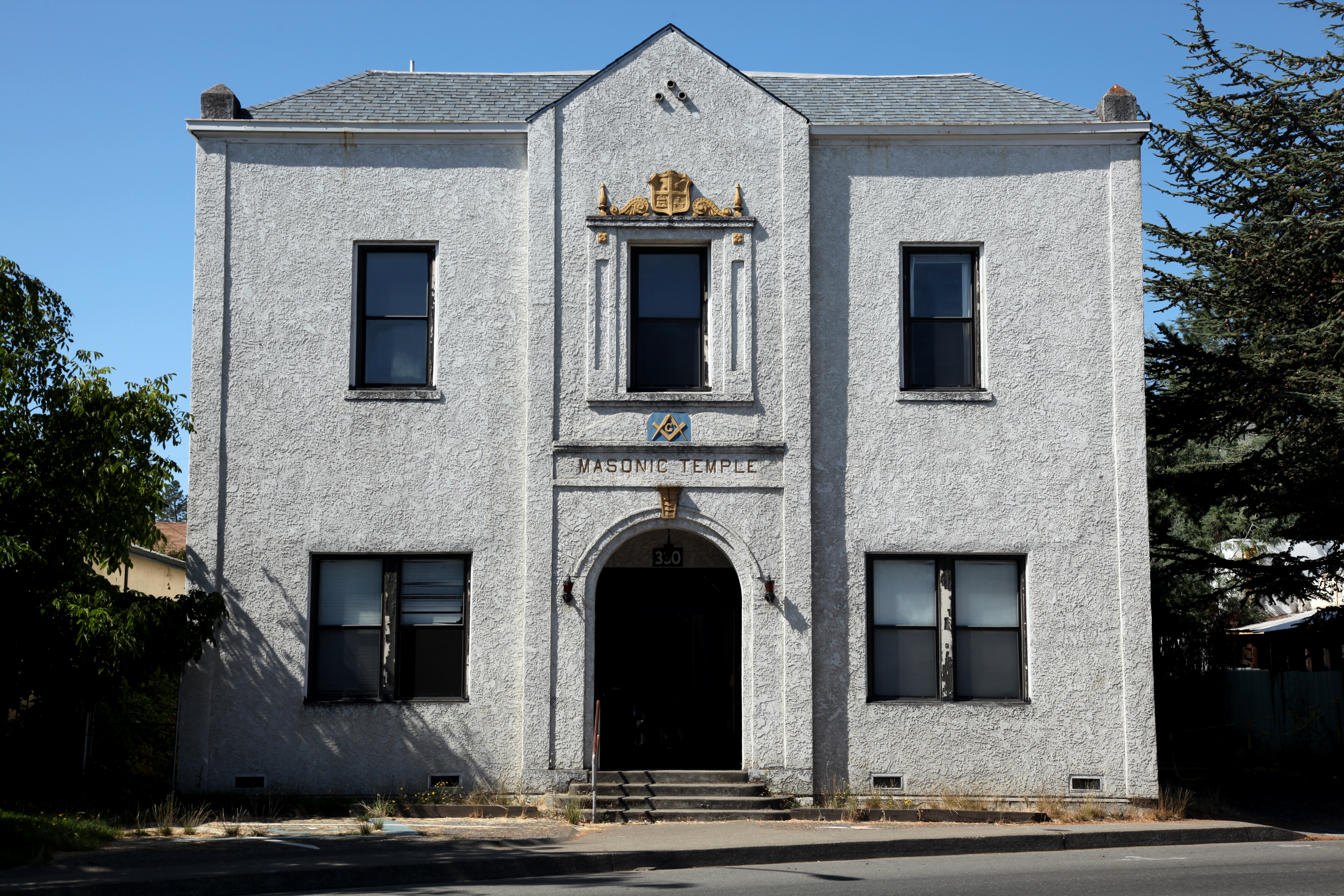
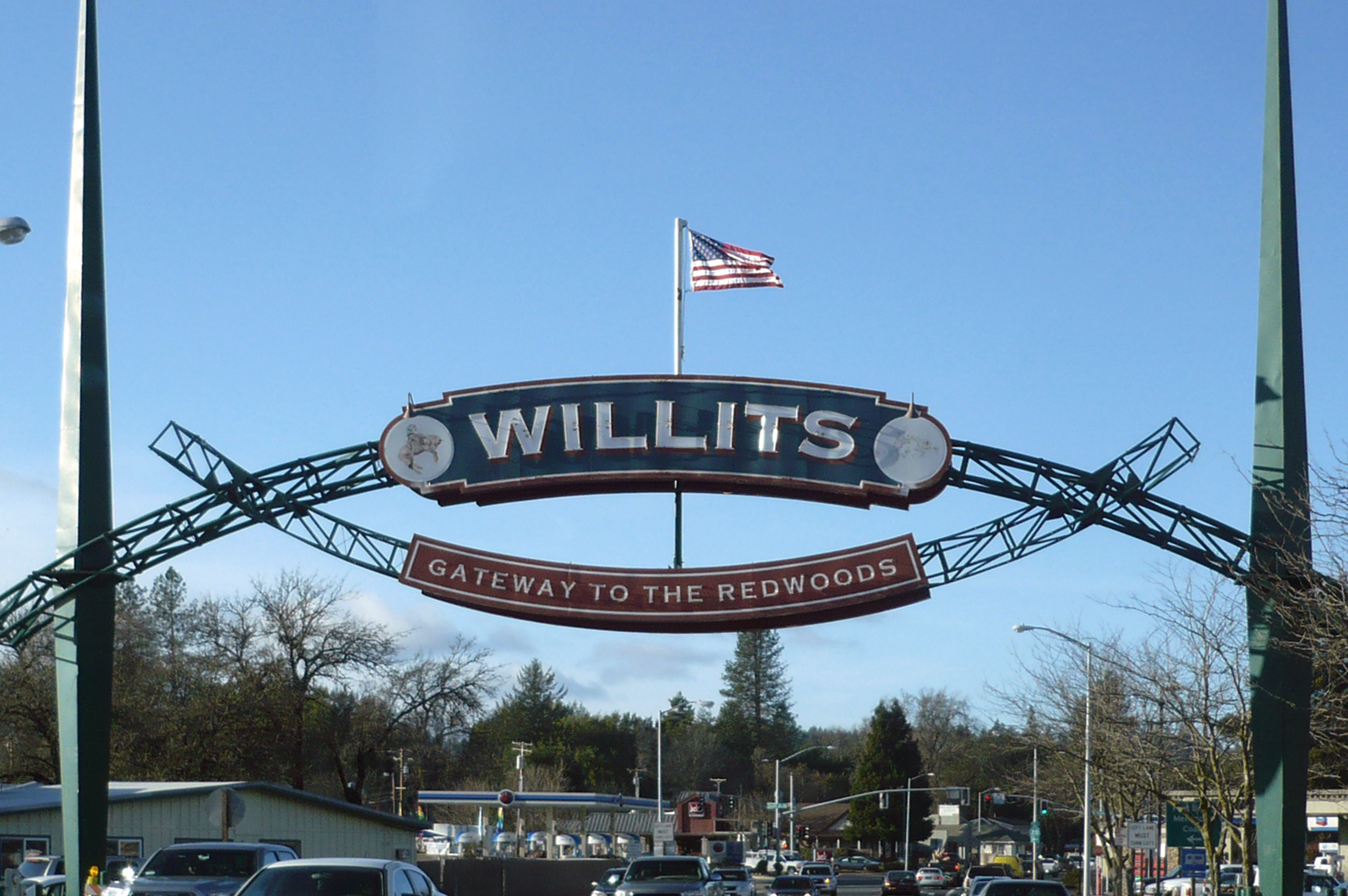
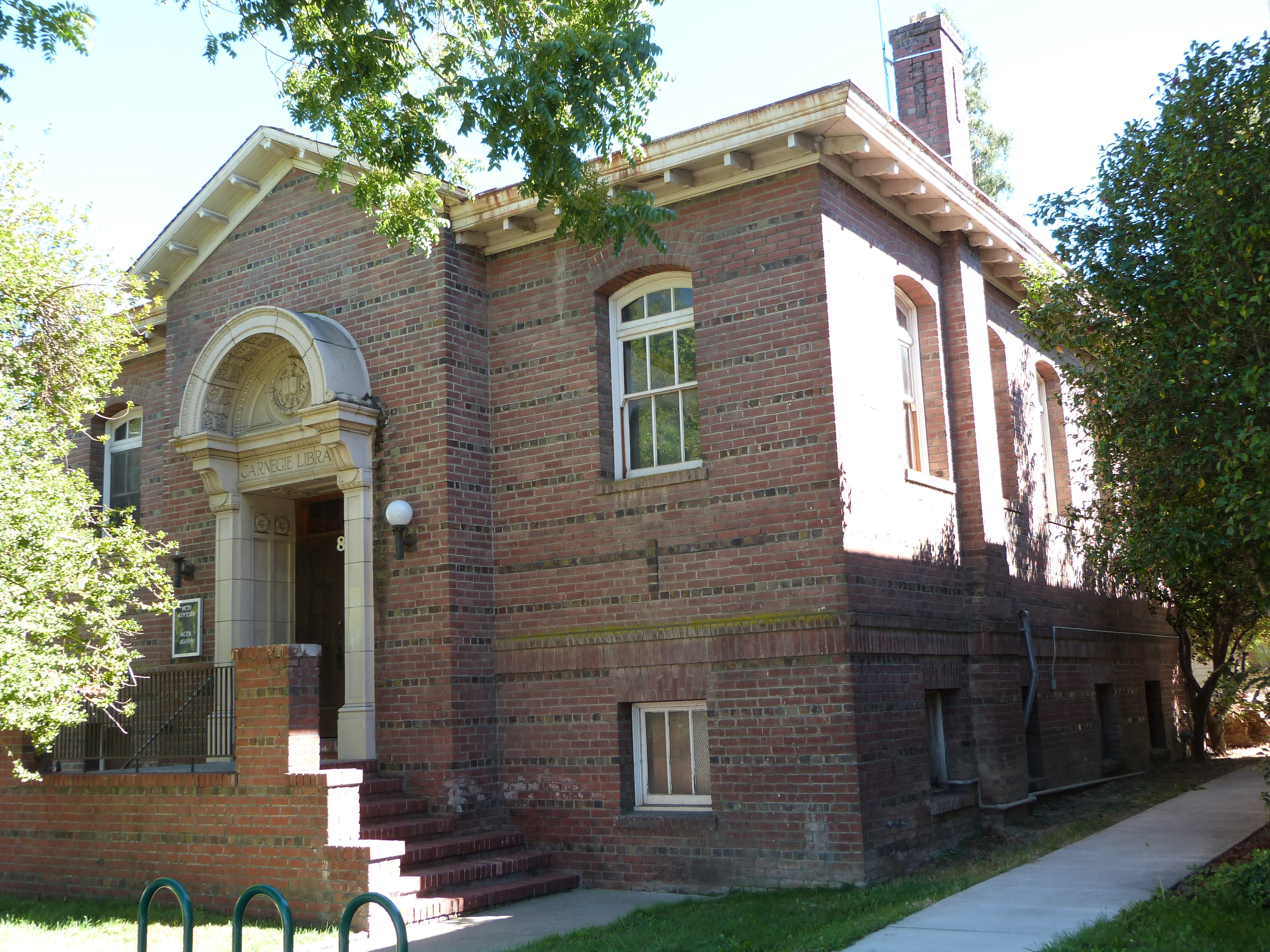
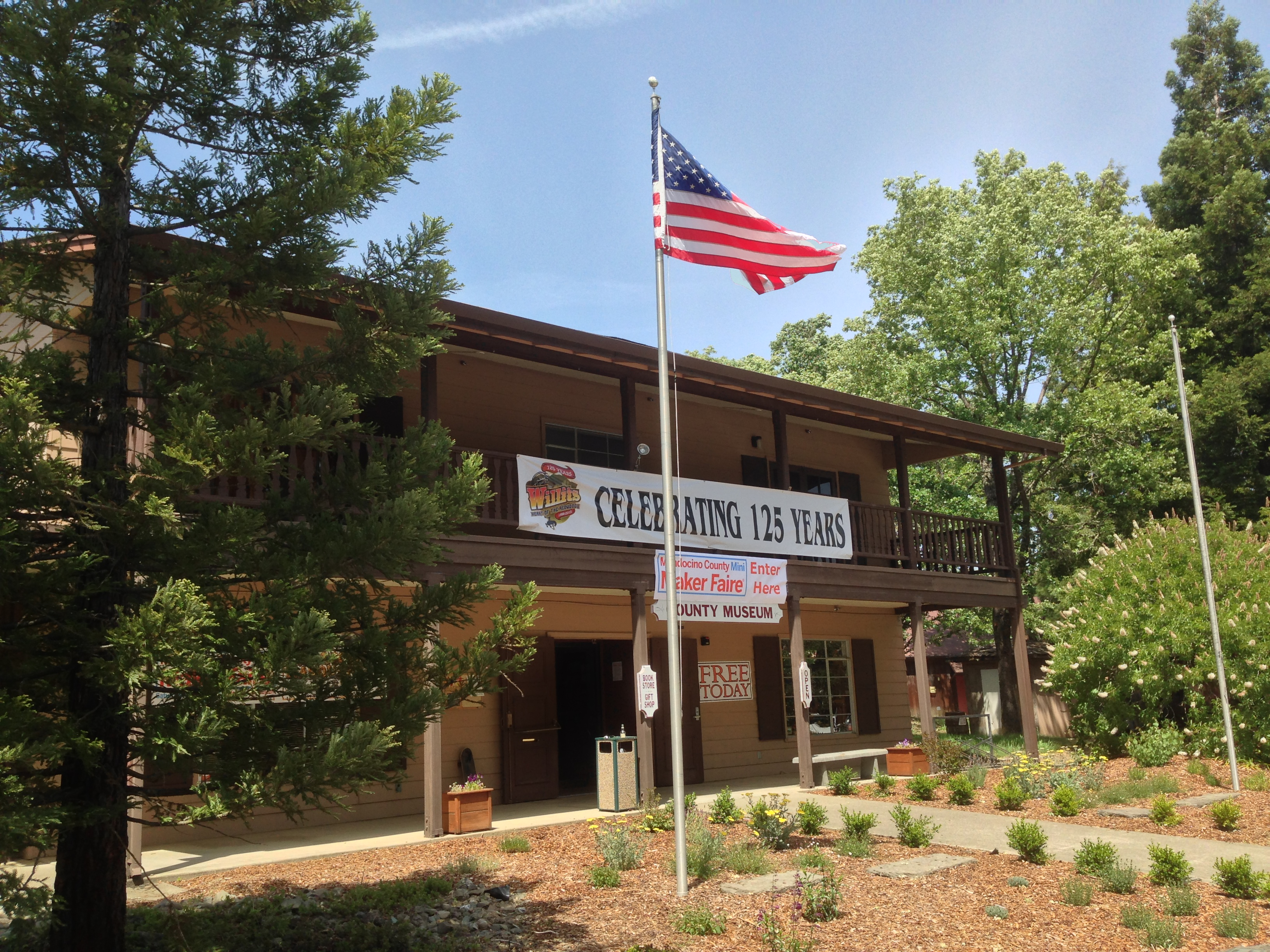
- Top: Masonic Temple (left) and Gateway to the Redwoods (right); Carnegie Library (left) and Mendocino County Museum (right)
- Interactive map of Willits, California
- Location within California Location within the United States
- Coordinates: 39°24′35″N 123°21′20″W
- Country: United States
- State: California
- County: Mendocino
- Incorporated: November 19, 1888

Government
  - Type: Council–manager
  - Mayor: Saprina Rodriguez

Area
  - Total: 2.82 sq mi (7.3 km^{2})
  - Land: 2.82 sq mi (7.3 km^{2})
  - Water: 0.00 sq mi (0 km^{2}) 0.17%
- Elevation: 1,391 ft (424 m)

Population (2020)
  - Total: 4,988
  - Density: 1,770.7/sq mi (683.7/km^{2})
- Time zone: UTC−08:00 (PST)
  - Summer (DST): UTC−07:00 (PDT)
- ZIP Code: 95490
- Area code: 707
- FIPS code: 06-85600
- GNIS feature ID: 1652654
- Website: cityofwillits.org

Willits (formerly Little Lake and Willitsville) is a city in Mendocino County, California, United States. It is located about 20 miles (32 km) north-northwest of Ukiah, at an elevation of 1,391 feet (424 m). The population was 4,988 at the 2020 census. Willits is at the center of Mendocino County and at the beginning of the county's extensive redwood forests as approached by Highway 101 from the south.

An arch stands in the center of Willits featuring the slogans "Gateway to the Redwoods" and "Heart of Mendocino County". The arch is the repurposed second version of the Reno Arch. Reno donated the arch to Willits in 1995.

== History ==
Hiram Willits arrived from Indiana in 1857 to settle in the Little Lake Valley. Kirk Brier founded the settlement on Willits' land. Willits was originally called "Willitsville". Later, when the post office opened in 1861, it was called "Little Lake". The name changed to Willits in 1874. The community incorporated in 1888.

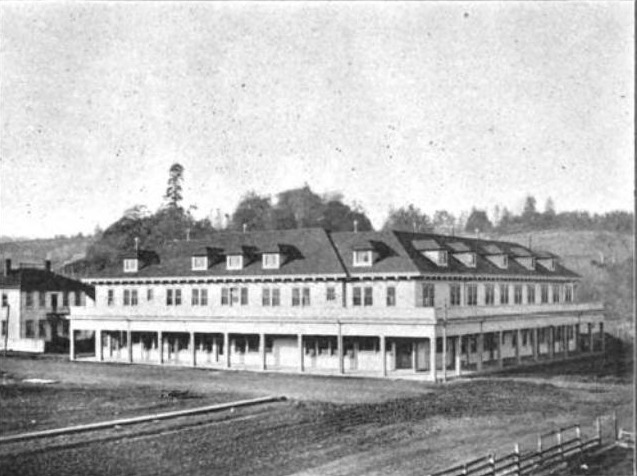
Willits Hotel, 1903

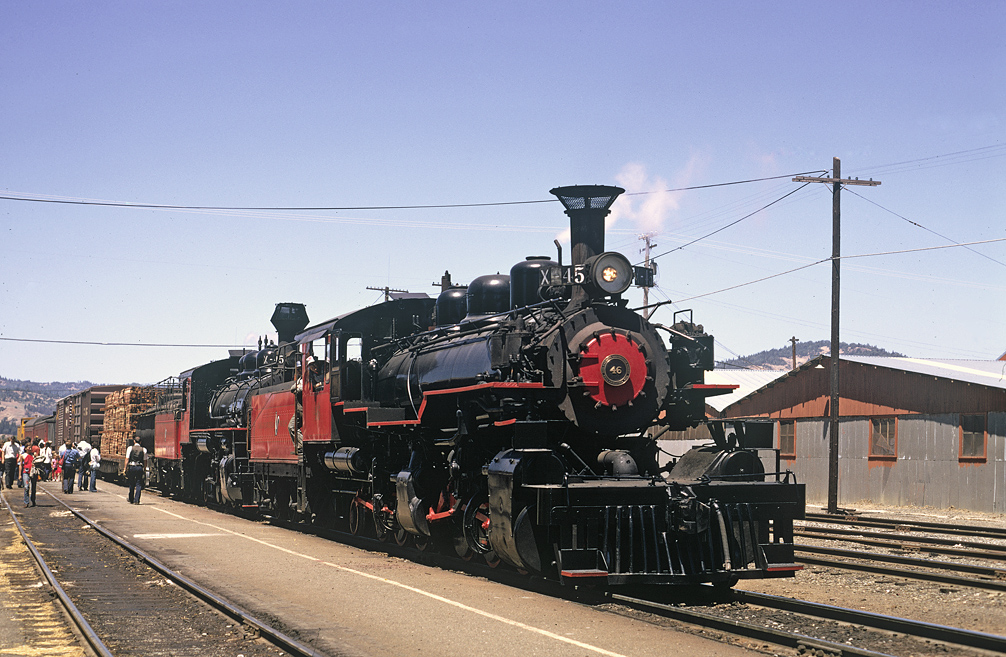
California Western Railroad excursion train at Willits Depot, 1974

Little Lake was the scene of a legendary feud between the Frost and Coates families. The Frost family supported the Confederacy during the American Civil War, and the Coates family supported the Union. Both families were passionate in their beliefs. On October 16, 1867, Election Day, the long-running feud came to a head. A brawl turned into a shootout in front of Baechtel's store, leaving Abraham Coates, Henry Coates, Albert Coates, Thomas Coates and Elisha Frost dead on the street. Three others were wounded.

In 1879, three men were charged with petty larceny, having been accused of stealing a saddle and harness. The three, it was later reported, had for years been involved in stealing, robbing smokehouses, drinking, and reckless discharging of their firearms. They were taken to Brown's Little Lake Hotel to await the arrival of the circuit court judge. Following a meeting at Willits' Masonic Temple, 30 masked temple members seized the prisoners, and they were hanged from a nearby bridge. A newspaper reported there was no proof the murdered men were guilty of the charges.

Willits became a boomtown due to the tanbark industry. The 1970s "back to the land" homesteading movement paved the way for Willits' reputation as the solar capital of the world in the 1980s.

The Willits area is the final home of the racehorse Seabiscuit. Ridgewood Ranch, where Seabiscuit trained, recuperated, lived out his retirement and was buried, is located a few miles south of the city.

=== Hexavalent chromium pollution and cleanup ===
Beginning in 1996, the city and many residents became embroiled in lawsuits against the Whitman Corporation (later acquired by PepsiCo, Inc.), alleging that hexavalent chromium pollution left by a chrome plating plant, which operated in Willits from 1964 to 1995, was responsible for several local health problems. Activist Erin Brockovich, known for the eponymous movie about her work in a similar case, participated in a lawsuit on behalf of the plaintiffs. By 2003, plans were put into place to inject a solution into strategic wells at the site to neutralize the chromium and remediate the pollution on site. These plans successfully reduced the pollution, and further injections and a monitoring plan were implemented in 2005 and 2008. In 2011, various lawsuits were combined into a single suit involving paying for the site cleanup and payouts to affected individuals; most lawsuits were resolved in 2012.

== Geography ==
Located at the center of Mendocino County in the Little Lake Valley, Willits is 23 miles (37 km) north of Ukiah and the same distance south of Laytonville on U.S. Route 101 (otherwise known as the Redwood Highway). It is on the west side of the Little Lake Valley, a 6-by-3-mile (10 by 5 km) area surrounded by the California Coast Ranges.

According to the U.S. Census Bureau, the city had a total area of 2.8 square miles (7.3 km^{2}), 99.96% of it land. Willits is located about halfway on the future Great Redwood Trail, a multi-use rail trail project.

=== Climate ===
Under the Köppen climate classification Willits has a dry-summer subtropical or mediterranean climate.

The mountains to the west along with a significant influence of mild Pacific air cause Willits to have a cool winter and hot day/cool night summer climate. Average January temperatures range from 32 to 55 °F (0 to 13 °C). Average July temperatures range from 47 to 85 °F (8 to 29 °C). There are an average of 26.9 days with highs of 90 °F (32 °C) or higher, and an average of 95.1 days with lows of 32 °F (0 °C) or lower. The record maximum temperature was 112 °F (44 °C) on July 24, 1902, and the record minimum temperature was 5 °F (−15 °C) on December 9, 1972.

Annual precipitation averages 49.23 inches (1,250 mm). The wettest "rain year" on record was from July 1903 to June 1904 with 86.60 inches (2,199.6 mm) and the driest from July 1990 to June 1991 with 28.08 inches (713.2 mm). The most precipitation in one month was 31.41 inches (797.8 mm) in December 1964. The most precipitation in 24 hours was 8.80 inches (223.5 mm) on December 22, 1964. There are an average of 94.8 days with measurable precipitation.

There are occasional snowfalls in Willits each year, with an average of 3.6 inches (9.1 cm) of snow annually. The most snow in one month was 20.0 inches (51 cm) in December 1964.

Climate data for Willits, California, 1991–2020 normals, extremes 1902–2012
Month	Jan	Feb	Mar	Apr	May	Jun	Jul	Aug	Sep	Oct	Nov	Dec	Year
Record high °F (°C)	77 (25)	84 (29)	90 (32)	98 (37)	100 (38)	105 (41)	112 (44)	107 (42)	105 (41)	102 (39)	90 (32)	85 (29)	112 (44)
Mean daily maximum °F (°C)	53.7 (12.1)	56.3 (13.5)	59.0 (15.0)	61.8 (16.6)	68.9 (20.5)	75.5 (24.2)	83.5 (28.6)	83.3 (28.5)	81.9 (27.7)	72.4 (22.4)	59.9 (15.5)	53.0 (11.7)	67.4 (19.7)
Daily mean °F (°C)	43.5 (6.4)	45.2 (7.3)	47.3 (8.5)	49.5 (9.7)	54.6 (12.6)	59.9 (15.5)	65.8 (18.8)	64.5 (18.1)	62.0 (16.7)	54.6 (12.6)	47.6 (8.7)	42.6 (5.9)	53.1 (11.7)
Mean daily minimum °F (°C)	33.3 (0.7)	34.1 (1.2)	35.5 (1.9)	37.3 (2.9)	40.2 (4.6)	44.2 (6.8)	48.0 (8.9)	45.6 (7.6)	42.1 (5.6)	36.9 (2.7)	35.3 (1.8)	32.3 (0.2)	38.7 (3.7)
Record low °F (°C)	12 (−11)	13 (−11)	19 (−7)	20 (−7)	21 (−6)	20 (−7)	25 (−4)	29 (−2)	20 (−7)	17 (−8)	13 (−11)	5 (−15)	5 (−15)
Average precipitation inches (mm)	9.17 (233)	8.63 (219)	7.07 (180)	3.44 (87)	1.78 (45)	0.50 (13)	0.04 (1.0)	0.05 (1.3)	0.37 (9.4)	2.57 (65)	5.77 (147)	9.84 (250)	49.23 (1,250.7)
Average snowfall inches (cm)	0.1 (0.25)	0.4 (1.0)	0.3 (0.76)	0.0 (0.0)	0.0 (0.0)	0.0 (0.0)	0.0 (0.0)	0.0 (0.0)	0.0 (0.0)	0.0 (0.0)	0.0 (0.0)	trace	0.8 (2.01)
Average precipitation days (≥ 0.01 in)	15.9	12.8	13.4	10.6	6.2	1.9	0.3	0.3	1.1	6.1	12.2	14.0	94.8
Average snowy days (≥ 0.1 in)	0.1	0.1	0.2	0.0	0.0	0.0	0.0	0.0	0.0	0.0	0.0	0.1	0.5
Source 1: NOAA (snow/snow days 1981–2010)
Source 2: National Weather Service

== Demographics ==
Historical population
Census	Pop.	Note	%±
1860	431		—
1870	946		119.5%
1880	153		−83.8%
1890	815		432.7%
1900	791		−2.9%
1910	1,153		45.8%
1920	1,468		27.3%
1930	1,424		−3.0%
1940	1,625		14.1%
1950	2,691		65.6%
1960	3,410		26.7%
1970	3,091		−9.4%
1980	4,008		29.7%
1990	5,027		25.4%
2000	5,073		0.9%
2010	4,888		−3.6%
2020	4,988		2.0%
2025 (est.)	4,760	▼	−4.6%
U.S. Decennial Census; 1870 Census

=== Racial and ethnic composition ===
Race and Ethnicity
Racial and ethnic composition	2000	2010	2020
White (non-Hispanic)	78.14%	71.36%	62.35%
Hispanic or Latino (of any race)	14.69%	20.62%	24.42%
Two or more races (non-Hispanic)	2.72%	2.86%	6.4%
Native American (non-Hispanic)	2.68%	3.01%	3.49%
Asian (non-Hispanic)	1.12%	1.29%	1.8%
Black or African American (non-Hispanic)	0.47%	0.65%	0.8%
Other (non-Hispanic)	0.14%	0.1%	0.62%
Pacific Islander (non-Hispanic)	0.04%	0.1%	0.12%

=== 2020 census ===
As of the 2020 census, Willits had a population of 4,988. The population density was 1,770.7 inhabitants per square mile (683.7/km^{2}). The racial makeup of Willits was 66.5% White, 0.9% African American, 4.9% Native American, 1.9% Asian, 0.1% Pacific Islander, 12.1% from other races, and 13.7% from two or more races. Hispanic or Latino of any race were 24.4% of the population.

The census reported that 97.6% of the population lived in households, 1.2% lived in non-institutionalized group quarters, and 1.2% were institutionalized. 99.8% of residents lived in urban areas, while 0.2% lived in rural areas.

There were 2,019 households, out of which 32.3% included children under the age of 18, 33.1% were married-couple households, 9.5% were cohabiting couple households, 37.4% had a female householder with no partner present, and 20.0% had a male householder with no partner present. 32.3% of households were one person, and 16.1% were one person aged 65 or older. The average household size was 2.41. There were 1,205 families (59.7% of all households).

The age distribution was 23.0% under the age of 18, 7.3% aged 18 to 24, 25.3% aged 25 to 44, 24.7% aged 45 to 64, and 19.7% who were 65 years of age or older. The median age was 40.2 years. For every 100 females, there were 89.8 males, and for every 100 females age 18 and over, there were 87.3 males.

There were 2,147 housing units at an average density of 762.2 units per square mile (294.3 units/km^{2}), of which 2,019 (94.0%) were occupied. Of these, 42.9% were owner-occupied, and 57.1% were occupied by renters. The homeowner vacancy rate was 1.0%, and the rental vacancy rate was 3.9%.

=== Income and poverty ===
In 2023, the US Census Bureau estimated that the median household income was $55,971, and the per capita income was $33,006. About 7.0% of families and 13.7% of the population were below the poverty line.

=== 2010 census ===
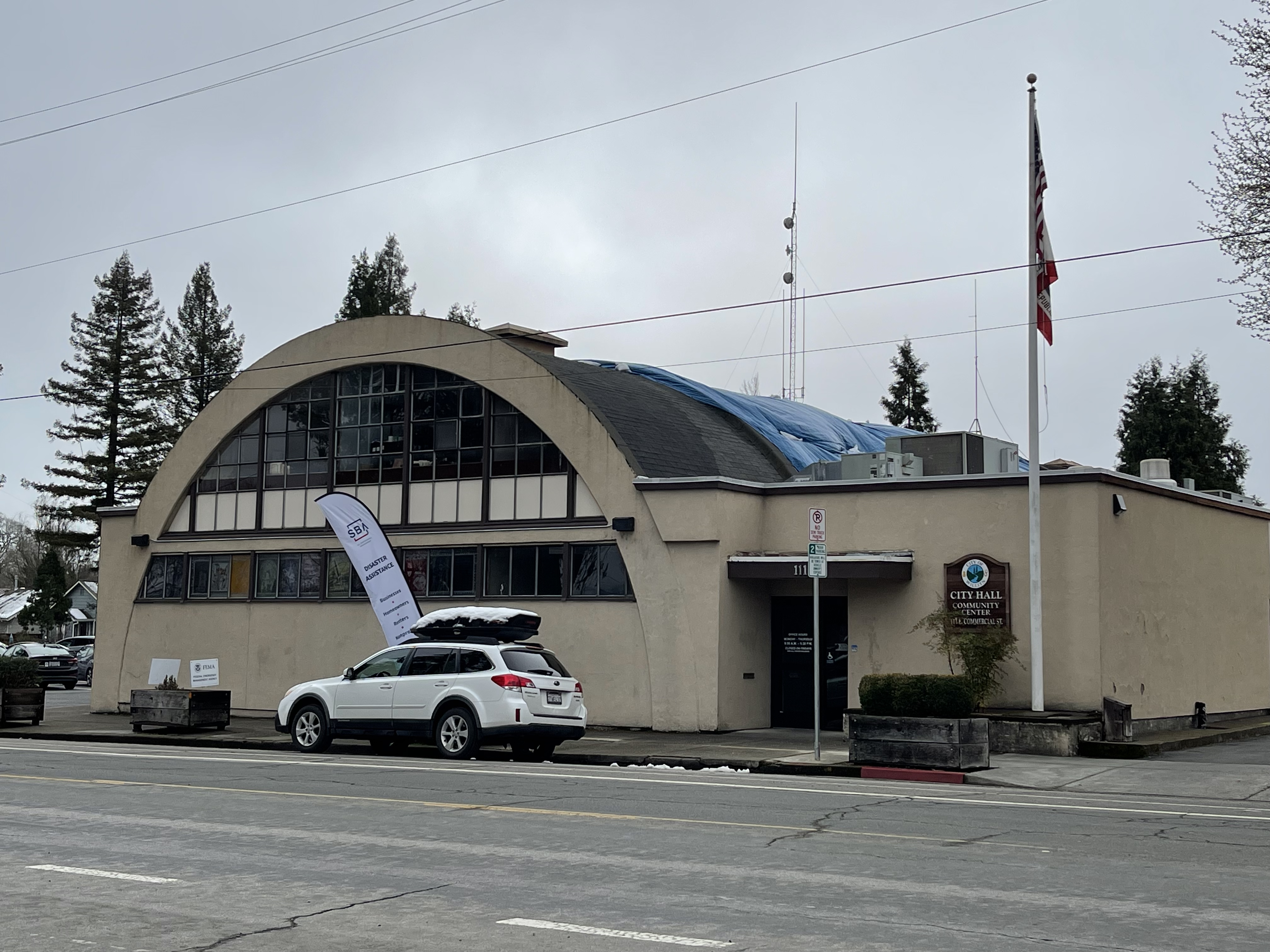
Willits City Hall and Community Center

The 2010 United States census reported that Willits had a population of 4,888. The population density was 1,743.7 inhabitants per square mile (673.2/km^{2}). The racial makeup of Willits was 3,862 (79.0%) White, 34 (0.7%) African American, 216 (4.4%) Native American, 68 (1.4%) Asian, 5 (0.1%) Pacific Islander, 479 (9.8%) from other races, and 224 (4.6%) from two or more races. Hispanic or Latino of any race were 1,008 persons (20.6%).

The Census reported that 4,794 people (98.1% of the population) lived in households, 52 (1.1%) lived in non-institutionalized group quarters, and 42 (0.9%) were institutionalized.

There were 1,914 households, out of which 667 (34.8%) had children under the age of 18 living in them, 693 (36.2%) were opposite-sex married couples living together, 320 (16.7%) had a female householder with no husband present, 143 (7.5%) had a male householder with no wife present. There were 163 (8.5%) unmarried opposite-sex partnerships, and 11 (0.6%) same-sex married couples or partnerships. 609 households (31.8%) were made up of individuals, and 281 (14.7%) had someone living alone who was 65 years of age or older. The average household size was 2.50. There were 1,156 families (60.4% of all households); the average family size was 3.13.

The population dispersal was 1,270 people (26.0%) under the age of 18, 412 people (8.4%) aged 18 to 24, 1,191 people (24.4%) aged 25 to 44, 1,273 people (26.0%) aged 45 to 64, and 742 people (15.2%) who were 65 years of age or older. The median age was 37.8 years. For every 100 females, there were 90.9 males. For every 100 females age 18 and over, there were 85.1 males. There were 2,073 housing units at an average density of 739.5 units per square mile (285.5 units/km^{2}), of which 843 (44.0%) were owner-occupied, and 1,071 (56.0%) were occupied by renters. The homeowner vacancy rate was 2.5%; the rental vacancy rate was 4.3%. 2,215 people (45.3% of the population) lived in owner-occupied housing units and 2,579 people (52.8%) lived in rental housing units.

== Economy ==
Major employers in Willits include the Adventist Health Howard Memorial Hospital and METALfx.

== Arts and culture ==
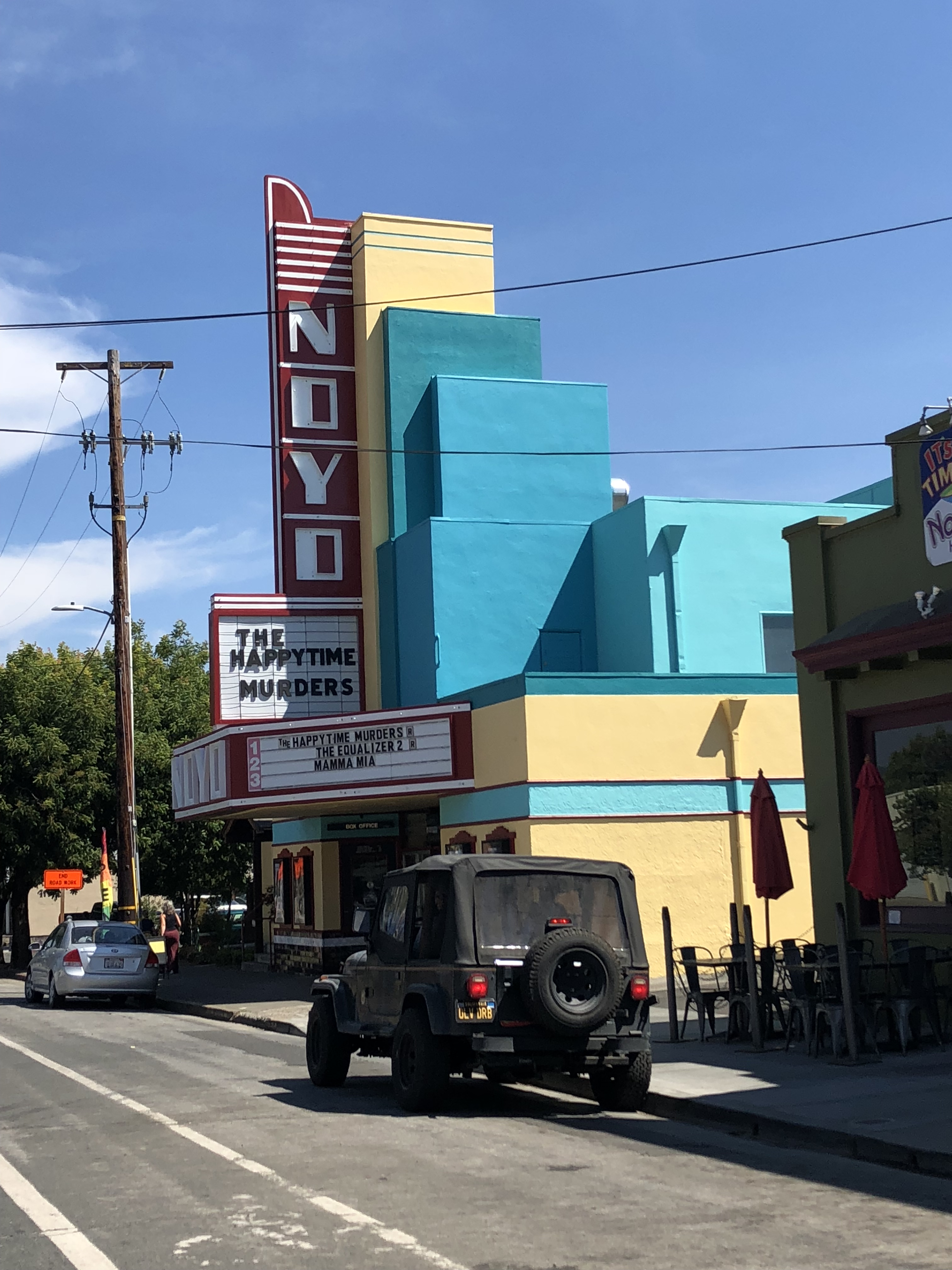
Noyo Theatre in Willits

Willits High School is located on the north end of Willits. The North County Center of Mendocino College is also in Willits.

Every July, Willits hosts the Frontier Days & Rodeo, the oldest continuous rodeo and Independence Day celebration in California. It is also home to the Roots of Motive Power Locomotive Museum, the Mendocino County Museum, and the Willits Center for the Arts.

== Government ==
Willits uses a council–manager form of government with a city council consisting of five council members. As of December 2022, the current mayor of Willits is Saprina Rodriguez.

In the state legislature, Willits is in the 2nd senatorial district, represented by Democrat Mike McGuire, and the 2nd Assembly district, represented by Democrat Chris Rogers.

Federally, Willits is in California's 2nd congressional district, represented by Democrat Jared Huffman.

== Media ==
Willits is served by local and regional newspapers as well as a low-power community radio station. The community radio station is KLLG, operated out of the Little Lake Grange. Local papers include The Mendocino Voice, Willits News, and Willits Weekly.

== Infrastructure ==
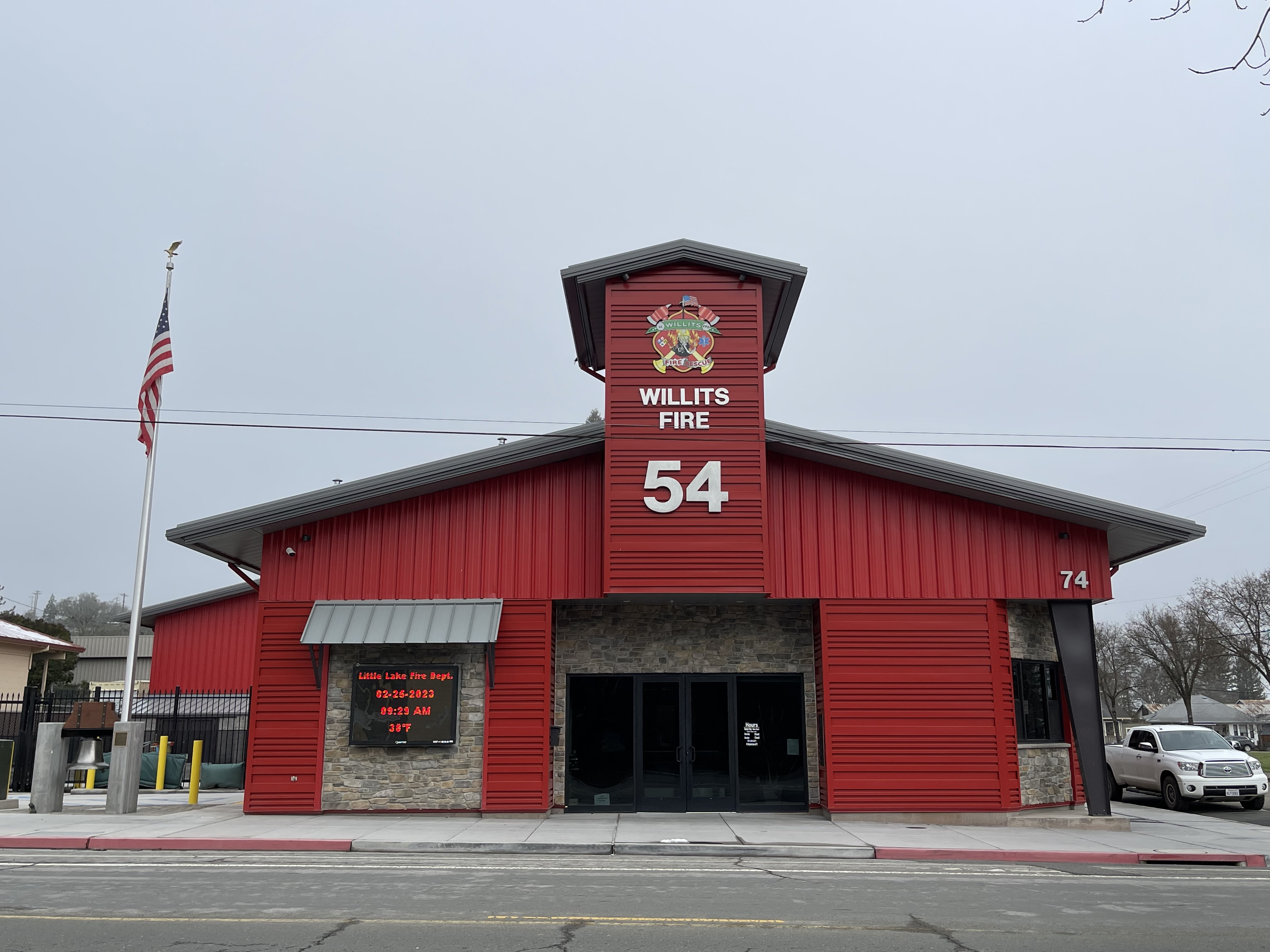
Willits Fire Station 54 built in 2022

=== Transportation ===
Willits is the eastern terminus of the California Western Railroad (otherwise known as the "Skunk Train"), running through the Coast Redwood forests to coastal Fort Bragg. The old redwood Willits Depot was built in 1915 by the Northwestern Pacific Railroad, a subsidiary of the Southern Pacific. It is registered as a National Historic Place.

The Amtrak Thruway 7 bus provides daily connections to/from Willits (with a curbside stop at 298 East Commercial Street), Martinez to the south, and Arcata to the north. Additional Amtrak connections are available from Martinez station.

Willits Municipal Airport (also known as Ells Field) is a public general aviation airport with one runway, located 3 miles (4.8 km) northwest of the city.

U.S. Route 101 is the major highway through the Little Lake Valley, passing just east of the Willits city limits, connecting Eureka to the north and San Francisco to the south. State Route 20 forks off of US 101 at a point just south of Willits, enters the city on South Main Street, and then heads west, running parallel to and several miles south of the Skunk Train's route, to Fort Bragg. In an effort to reduce traffic congestion in the city, especially on all of Main Street, the Willits Bypass project opened to traffic on November 3, 2016, despite the controversy related to its route through protected wetlands.

== Notable people ==
Some notable names from Willits include Judi Bari, labor leader and environmental activist, who fought to save the redwoods. Over 1,000 people attended her Willits funeral in 1997. Tré Cool, drummer for Green Day, lived in Willits during his teen years in the 1980s. Mona Gnader, the bass player for Sammy Hagar, also resided in Willits. Stagecoach bandit Charles Bolles (a.k.a. Black Bart) stole multiple Wells Fargo boxes and mail from stagecoaches traveling through Willits.

Phil Jordon, the first National Basketball Association player ever to have played prep basketball in the Redwood Empire area (coastal Northern California & coastal Southern Oregon), did so while at Willits High School.

Edith Ceccarelli, once the oldest person in the United States, was born in Willits.

== See also ==
- California wine
