= Skye Borgman =

American director and cinematographer

- Born: Klamath Falls, Oregon, USA
- Occupations: Director, Cinematographer and Professor
- Known for: Documentary films
- Website: http://www.skyeborgman.com

Skye Borgman is an American film director and cinematographer. She is best known for her work on the documentary film Abducted in Plain Sight.

== Early life ==
Skye was born in Klamath Falls, Oregon. She graduated from the Cornish College of the Arts with a bachelor's degree. After studying, she went to Europe, where she was inspired to delve into photography and storytelling more deeply. She returned to the US to study film at the University of Southern California. She is currently a professor at the University of Southern California.

== Career ==
Skye's debut documentary film Junk Dreams, won the Best Documentary Award at the Bare Bones International Film Festival and Accolade Award of Excellence. In 2017, she premiered Abducted in Plain Sight, also known as Forever B and produced by Top Knot Films, at the Mammoth Lakes Film Festival, and the film was released by Netflix in 2019. It also won the award for Best Documentary film at the Newport Beach Film Festival and Phoenix Film Festival.

== Filmography ==
Year	Film	Director	Producer	Notes
2005	Pebbles	✓	✗	Short film
2010	Junk Dreams	✓	✓	Documentary
2015	Axe to Grind	✗	✓	Feature film
2017	Abducted in Plain Sight	✓	✓	Documentary
2021	Dead Asleep	✓	✗	Documentary
2022	Girl in the Picture	✓	✓	Documentary
2022	I Just Killed My Dad	✓	✗	Documentary
2022	Sins of Our Mother	✓	✗	Documentary
2024	The Truth About Jim	✓	✓	Documentary
2024	American Murder: Laci Peterson	✓	✗	Documentary
2025	Unknown Number: The High School Catfish	✓	✗	Documentary
2025	Fit for TV: The Reality of The Biggest Loser	✓	✗	Docuseries
2025	My Father, the BTK Killer	✓	✓	Documentary
2025	Evil Influencer: The Jodi Hildebrandt Story	✓	✓	Documentary
2026	The Idaho Murders: College Nightmare	✓	✗	Docuseries

=== As cinematographer ===
- 2003 - Unsyncables at Any Age
- 2007 - Schooled
- 2007 - The Cellar Door
- 2007 - Underbelly
- 2008 - Raices torcidas
- 2008 - Fear House
- 2008 - Outrighteous
- 2010 - Junk Dreams
- 2010 - The Pathetically Cheap Adventures of Xtra-Man
- 2012 - Nothing Like Chocolate
- 2013 - The Resurrection of Malchus
- 2014 - Quiet Riot
- 2015 - Kevin Memorie
- 2015 - How Randy Rhoads Met Ozzy
- 2015 - Bondage
- 2017 - Abducted in Plain Sight
- 2018 - We Are Galapagos

== Awards and nominations ==
Year	Award	Category	Work	Result
2017	Tallgrass Film Festival	Outstanding Female Filmmaker	Abducted in Plain Sight	Won
