= Irmulco, California =

Archaic placename in California, United States

Irmulco
- Unincorporated community
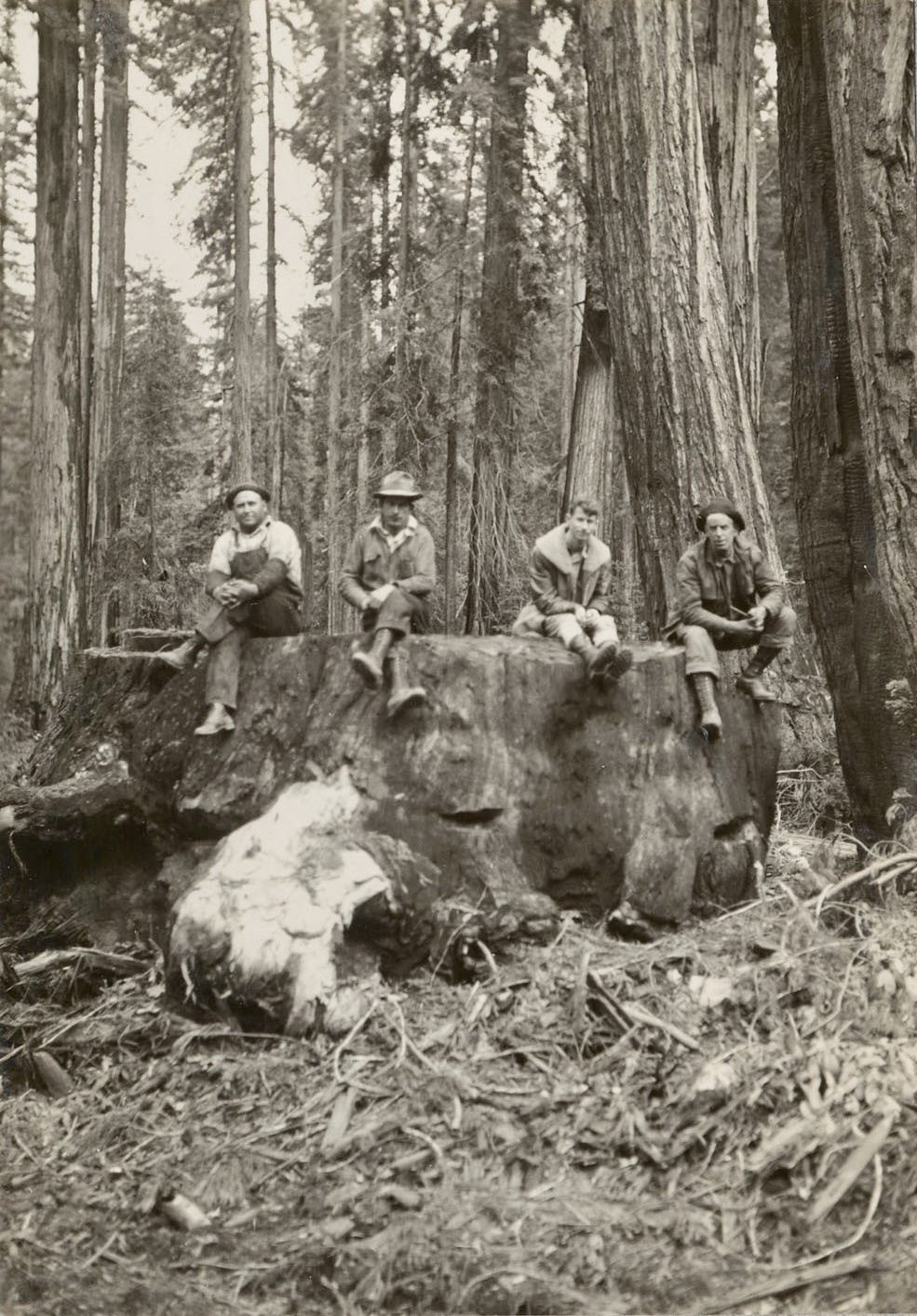
- "Seventeen-foot redwood stump. Cut January 1933. Age 1500+ years. Noyo River, about 3/4 mile above railroad trestle over Redwood Creek and between Irmulco and Shake City, Mendocino County, California" (photo by Emanuel Fritz)

- Location in California Irmulco (the United States)
- Coordinates: 39°25′20″N 123°31′03″W
- Country: United States
- State: California
- County: Mendocino
- Elevation: 436 ft (133 m)

Irmulco is a former logging town in Mendocino County, California, United States It was located on the California Western Railroad 12 miles (19 km) north-northeast of Comptche, at an elevation of 436 feet (133 m).

The name comes from an initialism of the Irvine and Muir Lumber Company. The Irvine and Muir Lumber Co. owned logging rights in the county and two lumber mills, including the one at Irmulco. The mill primarily processed redwood. In December 1909 a stage coach connection with the railroad was opened at Irmulco. A post office operated at Irmulco from 1911 to 1927. At the time of the settlement's application for a U.S. post office, the local population was about 220. In November 1912, heavy rain washed "50,000 feet of logs" out of Irmulco Dam. The Irmulco Mill Dam was partly destroyed in 1913. There was a redwood shingle mill at Irmulco around 1914. The mill may have shut down for a time as it was slated to reopen in March 1917, and the owners had hired a manager, a woods boss, and a sawyer. Three months later the engineer of a logging train was killed in an accident at Irmulco. A fire in 1921 destroyed the schoolhouse and several residences. At its peak in the early 20th century, Irmulco was home to a couple thousand residents drawn there by the lumber mill. Circa 1927, the area was described as "mostly brush, and redwood cut-over land with some non-merchantable timber of various kinds".

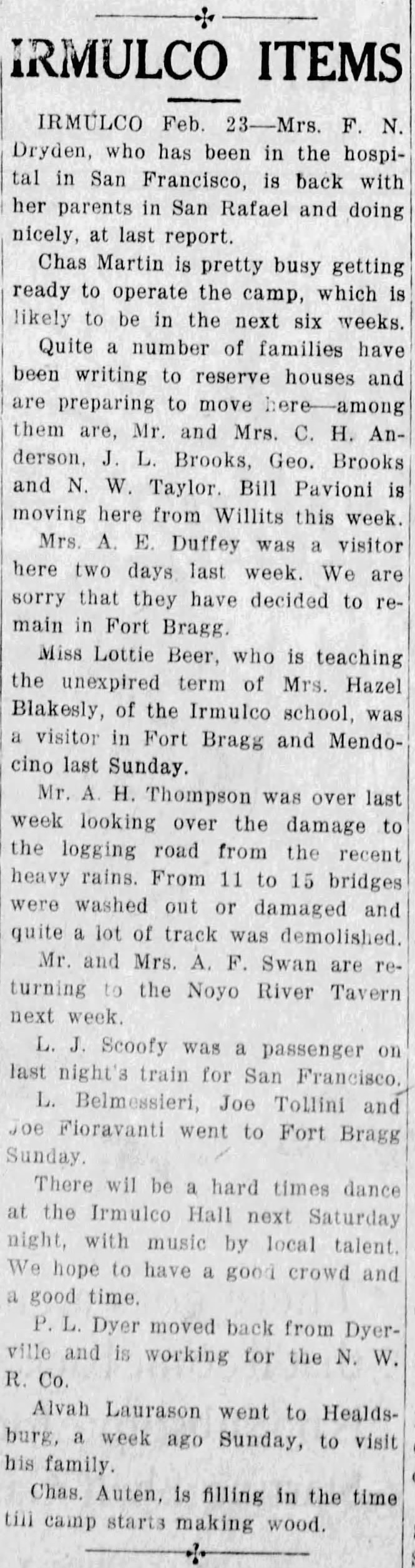
"Irmulco News" (Fort Bragg Advocate and News, 1925)

The remnants of the mill and most of the surviving buildings were destroyed in a fire in October 1928. According to the Ukiah Dispatch Democrat, the roof of the caretaker's house in the "old town" caught fire and "in a very short time practically all that was left of the abandoned town and mill was a raging inferno. After burning the buildings the fire raged up the south fork of the Noyo and destroyed all that was not burned up in the fire two years ago." In 1930, Irvine & Muir sold the townsite and the timberland to James L. Robertson, the mayor of nearby Willits. At that time, the land was said to have "plenty of good buildings for ranching operations. The land lies along the Noyo river and Redwood Creek...There are numerous springs and a good water supply, which was used when the mill was in operation, consisting of two 25,000 tanks fed by springs. This water is piped to the buildings. The land is also on the railroad and has a spur track to the old store building which will be remodeled for a barn." Robertson planned to establish a ranch in the area.

A small lumber mill was opened and operating near Irmulco in 1946.

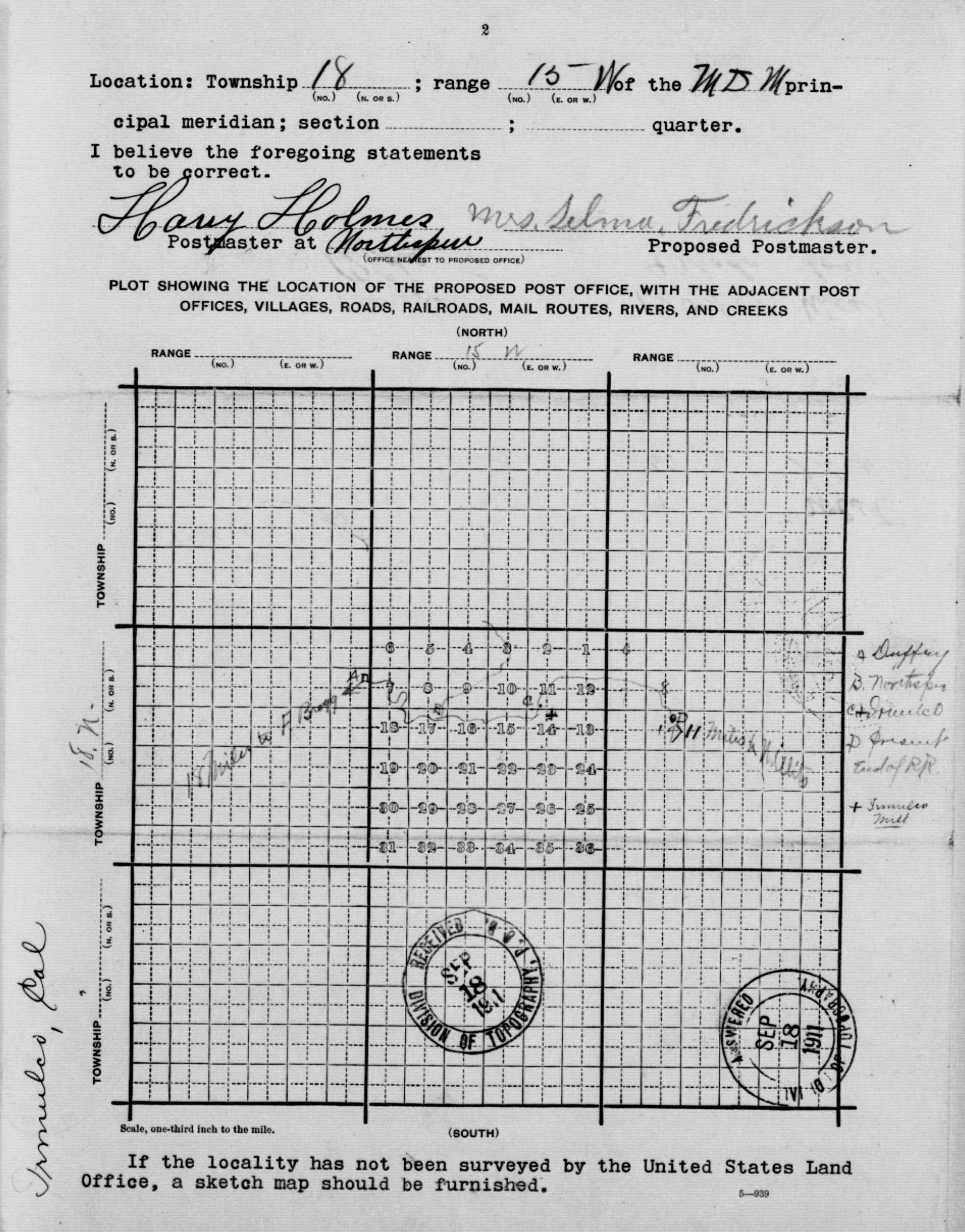
Map/diagram submitted with Irmulco post office application, 1911

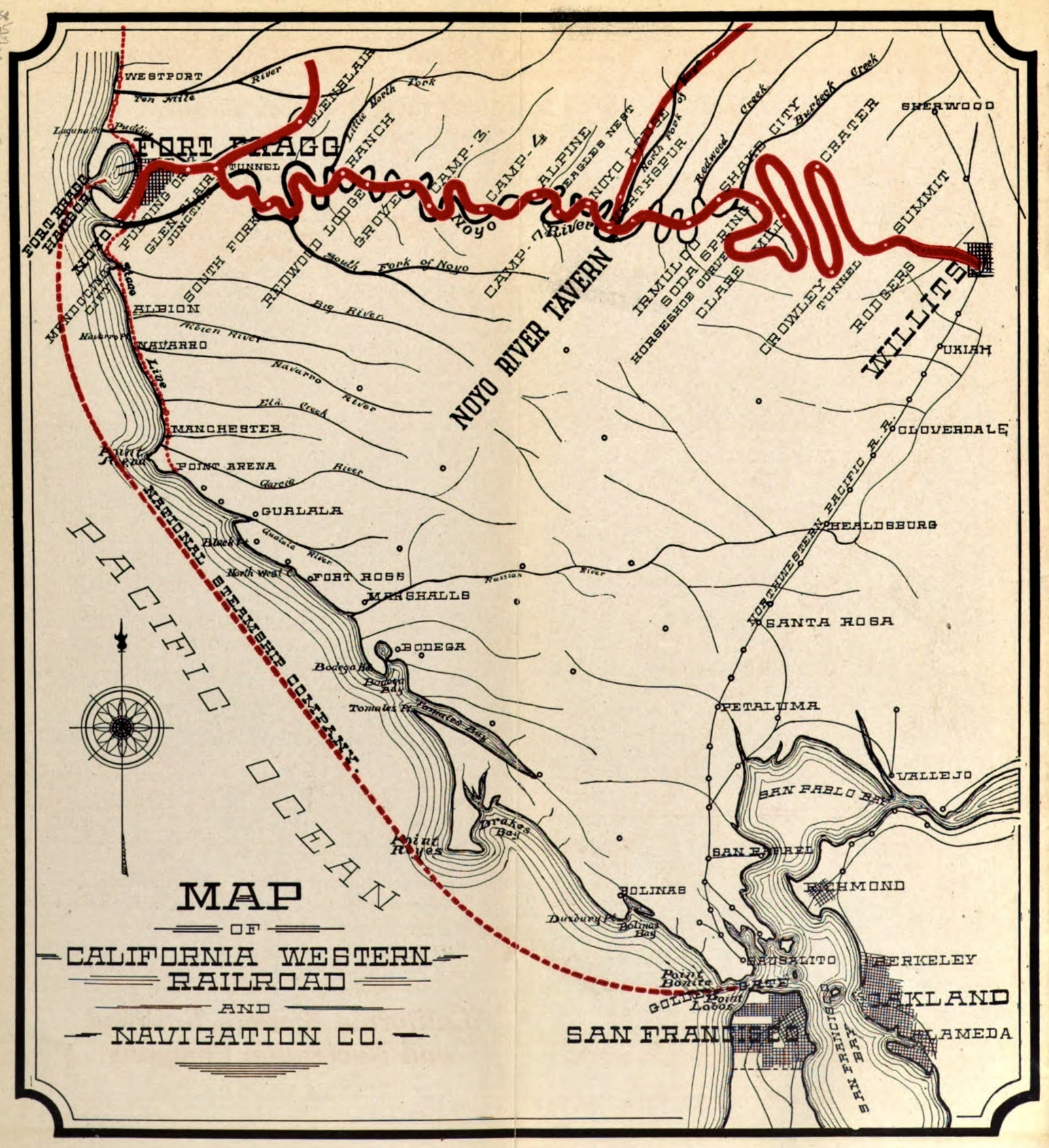
California Western Railroad map, 1915
