= California Western =

California Western may refer to:

- California Western Railroad in Fort Bragg, California
- California Western School of Law
