= California Western 45 =

Preserved 2-8-2 steam locomotive

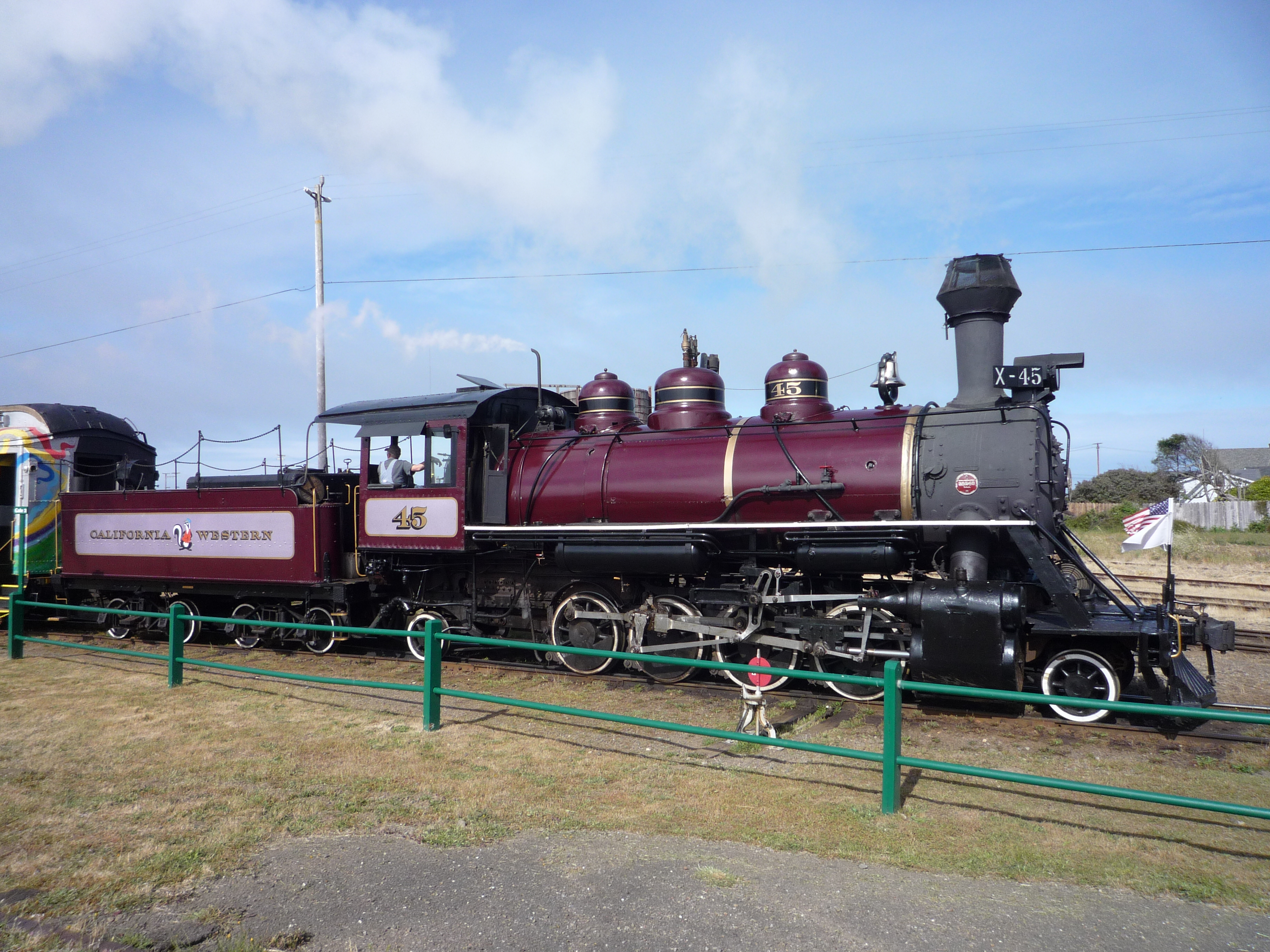
- No. 45, at Fort Bragg, California (c. 2011), prepares to depart for Willits with the "Super Skunk"
Type and origin
- Power type: Steam
- Builder: Baldwin Locomotive Works
- Serial number: 58045
- Model: 12-32 1/4 E
- Build date: October 1924
Specifications
- Configuration
  - Whyte: 2-8-2
  - UIC: 1′D1′ h2
- Gauge: 4 ft 8 1/2 in (1,435 mm)
- Driver dia.: 44 in (1.118 m)
- Wheelbase: Engine: 28.50 ft (8.69 m); Drivers: 12.08 ft (3.68 m); Total: 50.35 ft (15.35 m)
- Axle load: 30,000 pounds (13.6 tonnes)
- Adhesive weight: 120,000 pounds (54.4 tonnes)
- Loco weight: 152,000 pounds (68.9 tonnes)
- Total weight: 236,000 pounds (107.0 tonnes)
- Fuel type: New: Bunker C oil; Now: Motor oil
- Fuel capacity: 1,500 imp gal (6,800 L; 1,800 US gal)
- Water cap.: 4,000 imp gal (18,000 L; 4,800 US gal)
- Boiler pressure: 180 psi (1.24 MPa)
- Cylinders: Two, outside
- Cylinder size: 19 in × 24 in (483 mm × 610 mm)
- Valve gear: Walschaerts
- Valve type: Piston valves
- Loco brake: Air
- Train brakes: Air
- Couplers: Knuckle
Performance figures
- Maximum speed: 72km/h (45mph)
- Power output: 5220; plus superheater % = 6107; substitute firebox for grate area = 33275
- Tractive effort: 30,127 lbf (134.01 kN)
- Factor of adh.: 3.98
Career
- Operators: Owen-Oregon Lumber Company; Medford Corporation; California Western Railroad; Mendocino Railway
- Class: III
- Numbers: OOLC 3; MC 3; CWR 45; CWR 44
- Nicknames: Super Skunk
- Retired: 1964 (revenue service); 1980 (1st excursion service)
- Restored: July 10, 1965 (1st excursion service); 1983 (2nd excursion service)
- Current owner: Mendocino Railway
- Disposition: Undergoing 1,472-day inspection and overhaul

California Western 45 is a III class 2-8-2 "Mikado" type steam locomotive, built in October 1924 by the Baldwin Locomotive Works (BLW) for the Owen-Oregon Lumber Company, it is located at the California Western Railroad (CWR), known as the Skunk Train, in Fort Bragg, California.

== History ==
No. 45 was built in October 1924 by the Baldwin Locomotive Works (BLW) for the Owen-Oregon Lumber Company, (Brownlee-Olds Lumber Co., later the Medford Corporation) where it hauled lumber until its retirement in 1964, when Medford Corporation sold it to the California Western Railroad (CWR). It was restored to running condition and made its first inaugural run for the railroad on July 10, 1965.

The locomotive was originally built to burned bunker C fuel oil, it was later converted to burn recycled motor oil.

Between 1965 and 1980, No. 45, along with stablemate No. 46, (a 2-6-6-2 Mallet), pulled the railroad's Fort Bragg - Willits summer steam excursion train, the "Super Skunk". The California Western discontinued steam service in 1981. In 1984, No. 46 was donated to the Pacific Southwest Railway Museum (PSRM), as a result of high maintenance costs, and the opinion that the locomotive was too light on its feet. (No. 46 was a saddle-tank locomotive, before California Western added a tender and removed the aforementioned tank.)

In 1983, after two-year operational hiatus, the locomotive briefly returned to service, and was renumbered No. 44 for a role in Racing with the Moon. The locomotive retained this number for several months.

The Mendocino Railway, a subsidiary of Sierra Northern, purchased the railroad on December 17, 2003, after the California Western filed for bankruptcy.

In 2001, the locomotive was removed from service for an overhaul. The locomotive returned to service in May 2004, and operated regular "Skunk Train" service to Northspur Wednesday through Saturday, May through October. In 2015, the locomotive was removed from service once again for a mandated 1472-day inspection and overhaul, and as of 2026, overhaul work is still in progress.
