= Noyo River Bridge =

Bridge in Fort Bragg, California, United States

Noyo Bridge
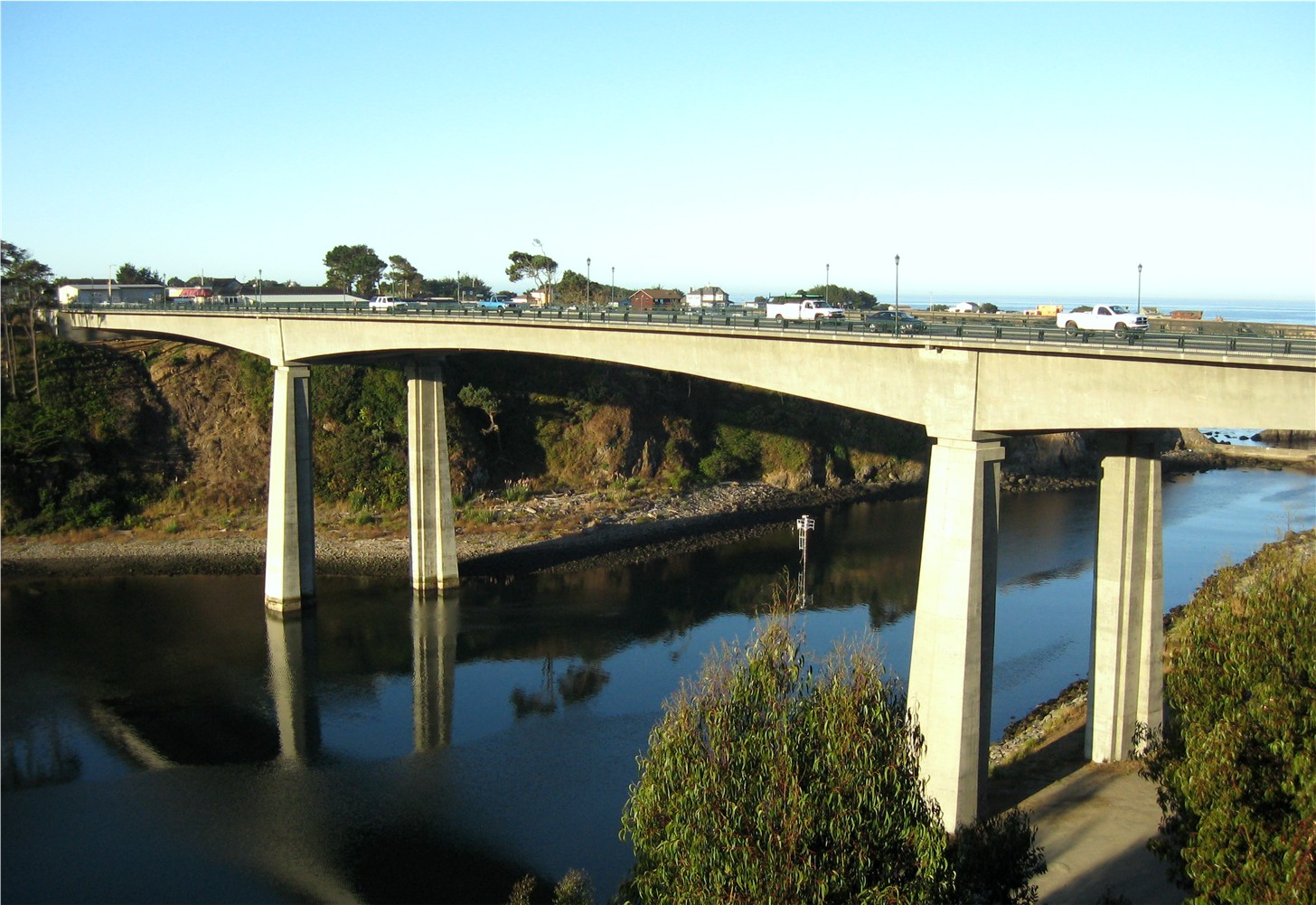
- The sixth, and current, Noyo Bridge
- Coordinates: 39.4273°N 123.8068°W
- Carries: SR 1, motor vehicles, pedestrians and bicycles
- Crosses: Noyo River
- Locale: Fort Bragg, Mendocino County, California, United States
- Official name: Noyo River Bridge
- Owner: California Department of Transportation
- Maintained by: CalTrans District 1
- ID number: 10 0298 (Note: National Bridge Inventory)
- Preceded by: Georgia-Pacific Haul Road Bridge

Characteristics
- Design: Box girder (Beam)
- Material: Prestressed concrete
- Total length: 875 feet (267 m)
- Width: 86.6 feet (26.4 m)
- Height: 110 feet (34 m)
- Longest span: 327.1 feet (99.7 m)
- No. of spans: 3
- Piers in water: 2
- Load limit: 5.96 short tons (5.4 t) (HS20+Mod)
- Clearance below: 91.9 feet (28.0 m)
- No. of lanes: 4 (11.8 ft (3.6 m) wide) (Note: CA Coastal Comm. Revised Findings)

History
- Constructed by: MCM Construction
- Construction start: May 2002
- Construction end: August 2005 (Note: Scenic Bridge Railings)
- Construction cost: US$31.1 million
- Opened: August 5, 2005
- Inaugurated: August 12, 2005
- Replaces: Noyo River Bridge (5^{th}, 1948-2005)

Statistics
- Daily traffic: 23,950 (3% trucks)

Location
- Location on California State Route 1 (Shoreline Highway/Main Street)

The Noyo River Bridge is a box girder bridge constructed of prestressed concrete crossing the Noyo River in Fort Bragg, California. Owned and maintained by the California Department of Transportation, it carries motor vehicle, bicycle and pedestrian traffic over the waterway as part of California State Route 1, which is also signed as Main Street within the Fort Bragg city limits. Construction on the current bridge began in 2002 and was completed in August 2005, now the sixth such structure to span the river near its mouth and bear the name Noyo River Bridge, replacing a two-lane steel deck truss bridge built in 1948.

Despite being listed as only four lanes, the inclusion of a full lane-width median, a bicycle path for both directions and the use of the ST-10 scenic railings resulted in a bridge deck that measures 86.6 feet (26.4 m) wide. In comparison, the deck width of the Golden Gate Bridge is only 82 feet (25 m).

== Predecessors ==
The current bridge is the sixth crossing to have been built at the mouth of the Noyo River. Only the two most recent iterations have been high-span designs, carrying traffic above Noyo Cove at the same elevation as the coastal bluffs on which the majority of the city is located. The distance between the two sides at the cove is over 800 feet, though the river below is less than 100 feet wide. The first four bridges were instead sited 1,000 feet (300 m) east or approximately 1/3 mile upriver at one of the few shore-level spaces along the river's length that would permit footings on the riverbanks themselves as it abruptly turns approximately 130° and the navigation channel narrows to less than 30 feet. Prior to the first bridge being built in 1861, river crossings were made on a cable ferry which also operated at the same narrow point in the channel.

== Railings ==
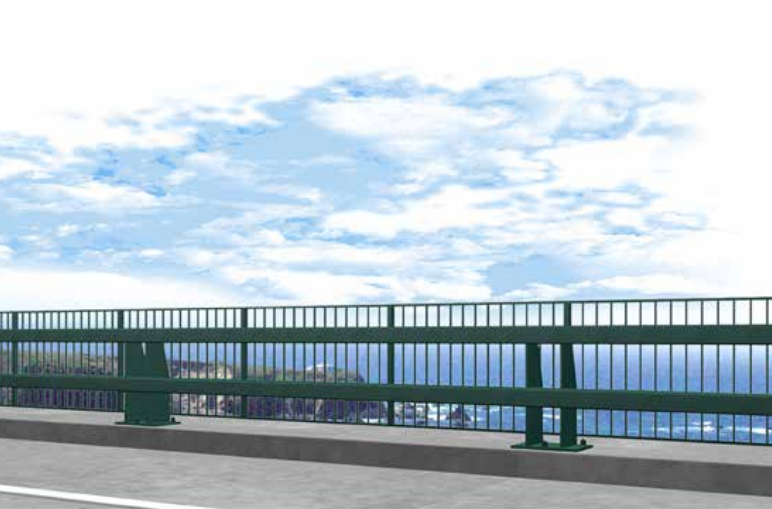
Rendering of CalTrans ST-10 railing on Noyo River Bridge

Noyo River Bridge served as the impetus for CalTrans approving an entirely new design specification for bridge railings, one that preserved the sightlines for motorists and passengers to a far greater degree than any approved for use in the state for over 50 years. The initial design proposal had called for use of the standard freeway overpass configuration that had been in use since the 60s and employed solid concrete barriers on each side measuring 42 inches (110 cm) high that completely obstructed the view of the ocean and harbor for occupants in standard passenger cars. This prompted a local outcry and attention from the California Coastal Commission who worked with CalTrans for over two years on alternatives that preserved sightlines without negatively impacting safety tests, ultimately resulting in an entirely new "scenic bridge" railing design termed ST-10 being approved for use state-wide and installed on the new Noyo Bridge.

== In popular culture ==
The 5^{th} bridge can be seen in the movies Johnny Belinda, Overboard, The Russians Are Coming, the Russians Are Coming, and Dying Young. It is also shown in multiple episodes of Murder, She Wrote.
