= Northspur, California =

Unincorporated community in California, United States

Northspur
- Unincorporated community
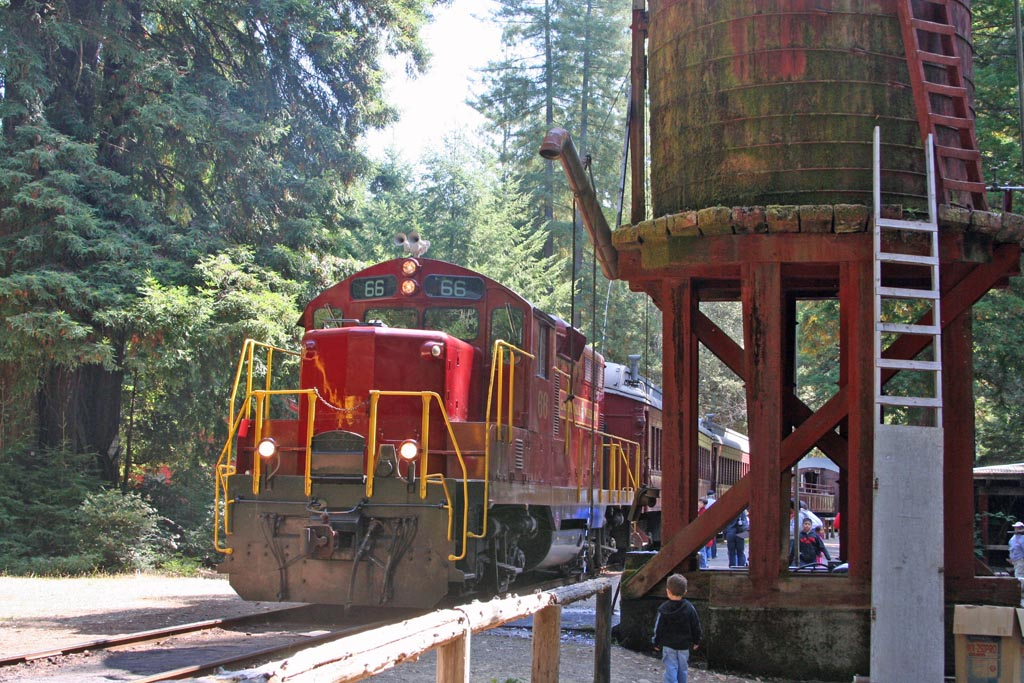
- The Skunk Train at Northspur in 2005

- Location in California Northspur (the United States)
- Coordinates: 39°25′22″N 123°33′07″W
- Country: United States
- State: California
- County: Mendocino
- Elevation: 358 ft (109 m)

Northspur is an unincorporated community in Mendocino County, California, United States. It is located on the California Western Railroad, 11 miles (18 km) north of Comptche, at an elevation of 358 feet (109 m) at Milepost 20.

At one time Northspur had a population of some 400 people, but that figure declined, along with the logging industry in the area. In 1974, there were still a few residents completely dependent on rail service on the California Western for travel into and out of the community. Today Northspur is primarily a stop on the railroad where refreshments and entertainment are available in season.

Services at Northspur station
Preceding station	California Western Railroad	Following station
Fort Bragg Terminus	Skunk Train	Willits Terminus

A post office operated at Northspur from 1910 to 1922.
