= Shake City, California =

Archaic placename in California, United States

Shake City
- Unincorporated community
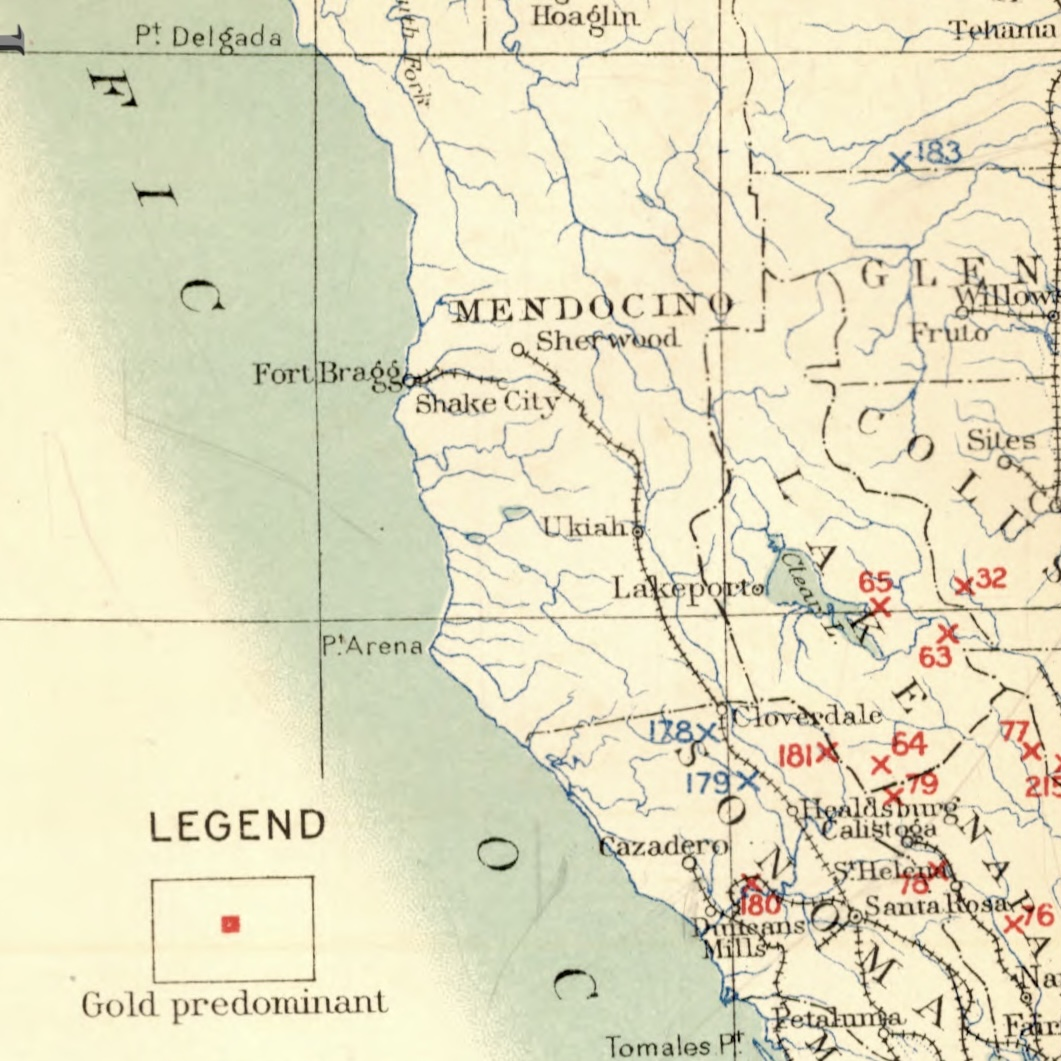
- Shake City on a 1912 map of American mining districts

- Location in California Shake City (the United States)
- Coordinates: 39°25′52″N 123°28′02″W
- Country: United States
- State: California
- County: Mendocino
- Elevation: 528 ft (161 m)

Shake City is an archaic placename in Mendocino County, California, United States. It is located on the California Western Railroad, 6.25 miles (10 km) west-northwest of Willits, at an elevation of 528 feet (161 m). Circa 1916, a kind of logging operation called a bark camp was located at or near Shake City. For a handful of years in the mid-1930s, the settlement supported a Mendocino County baseball team called the Shake City Loggers. During the Great Depression years, there was enough activity at the logging camp that it attracted vagrants: one unemployed man was charged with robbing a cabin near Shake City, and an "unknown tramp" walking from Fort Bragg was killed on the railroad tracks. Famed forestry professor Emanuel Fritz photographed a 17 foot (5.2 m)-diameter redwood stump from a tree logged near Shake City. There was a railroad tie production facility at Shake City in 1937. The railroad trestle at Shake City burned in 1941 but was promptly repaired. By 1960, Shake City was still a name on a map but its history was a mystery to a Petuluma newspaper columnist. In 1967, Union Lumber Company owned timber stands near Shake City.
