= Willits station =

Railway station in Willits, California

Willits
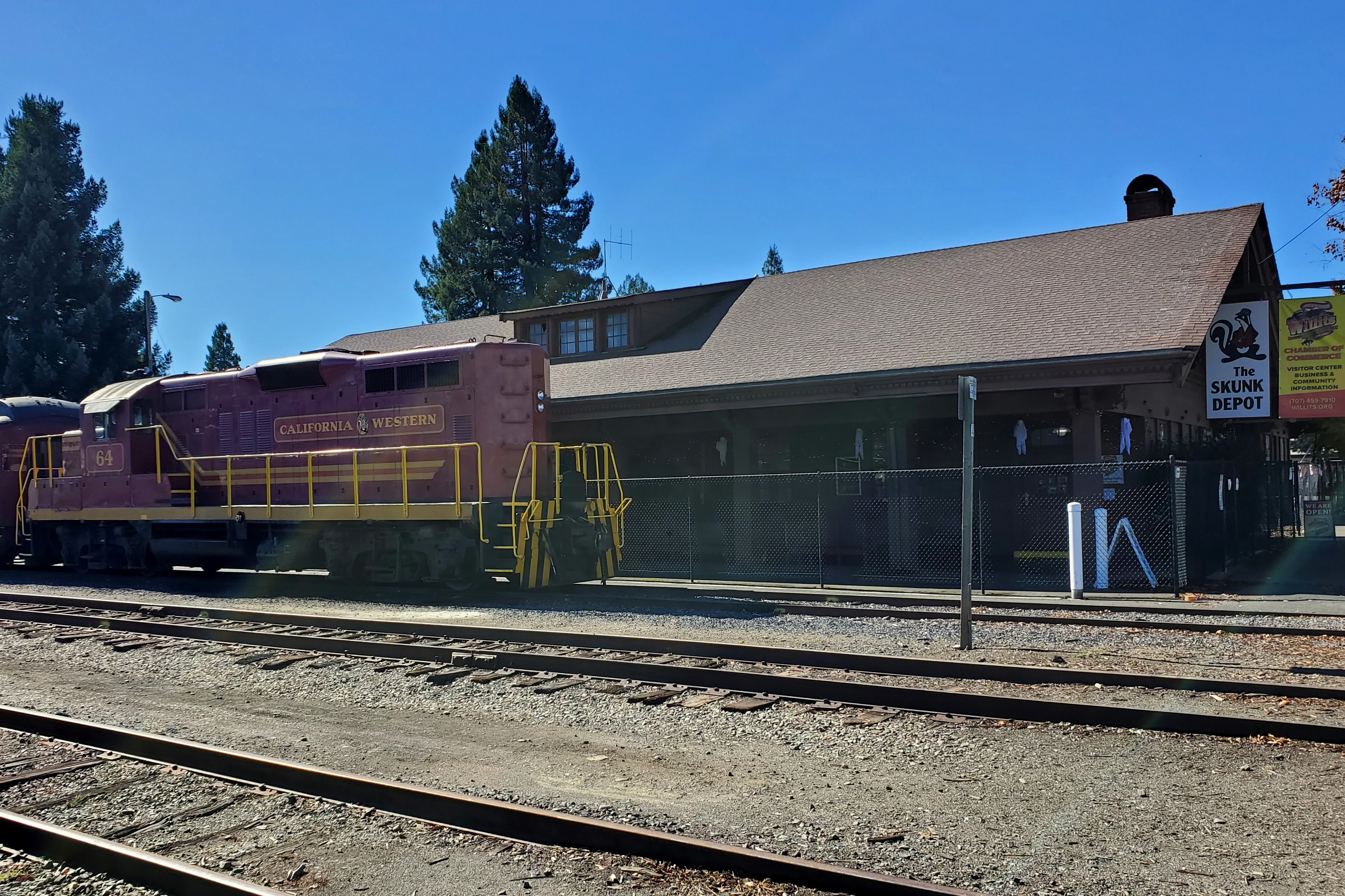
- A California Western Railroad train at Willits station in 2023

General information
- Location: 299 East Commercial Street; Willits, California
- Lines: Northwestern Pacific Railroad; California Western Railroad
- Tracks: 5
- Connections: Amtrak Thruway: 7

Other information
- Station code: Amtrak: WTS

History
- Opened: 1915

Services
Preceding station	California Western Railroad	Following station
Northspur toward Fort Bragg	Skunk Train	Terminus

Former Services
Preceding station	Northwestern Pacific Railroad	Following station
Longdale toward Eureka	Main Line	Ridge toward Sausalito
- Willits Depot
- U.S. National Register of Historic Places
- Coordinates: 39.4125°N 123.349722°W
- Built: 1915
- Built by: Northwestern Pacific Railroad
- Architect: D. J. Patterson
- Architectural style: Bungalow / American Craftsman
- NRHP reference No.: 99001262
- Added to NRHP: October 20, 1999
Location

Willits station is a train station in Willits, California. It is the east end of California Western Railroad, which operates Skunk Train excursion service between Willits and Fort Bragg.

== History ==
The Northwestern Pacific Railroad reached Willits by 1901, and passenger service to the original station began in 1902. That station was demolished in 1915 and rebuilt in its current location; a parking lot sits on the site of the original. Northwestern Pacific passenger service ended after April 30, 1971.

The depot was added to the National Register of Historic Places on October 20, 1999, as Willits Depot.

== Connections ==
Amtrak Thruway Route 7 buses stop here on their way from Martinez station north to Arcata.
