= California Western Railroad =

Heritage railroad in Mendocino County, California, US

Coordinates: 39.4455°N 123.8068°W

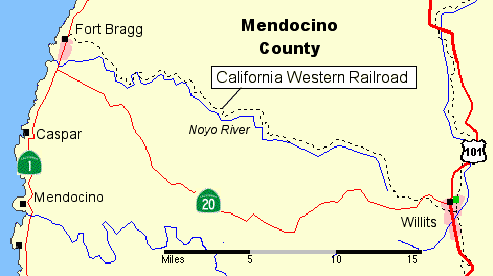
- Map of the California Western Railroad (created using nationalatlas.gov)

Overview
- Owner: Sierra Railroad
- Locale: Mendocino County, California, U.S.
- Termini: Ft. Bragg; Willits
- Website: https://www.skunktrain.com/

Service
- Type: Heritage railway
- System: CWR
- Services: 2
- Depot(s): Fort Bragg, California, Willits, California
- Ridership: 60,000 (2018)

History
- Opened: 1885 as Fort Bragg Railroad
- Sold: 2003

Technical
- Line length: 40 mi (64 km)
- Track gauge: 4 ft 8 1/2 in (1,435 mm) standard gauge
- Highest elevation: 1,740 ft (530 m)

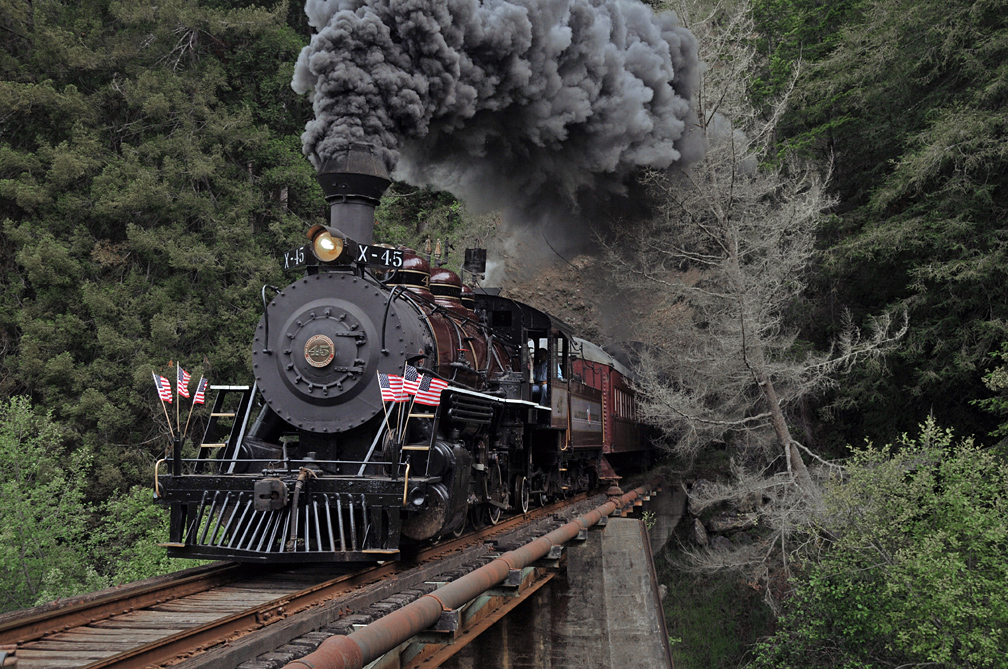
California Western 45 photo special eastbound at the first crossing of the Noyo River, 2009

The California Western Railroad (reporting mark CWR), AKA Mendocino Railway, popularly called the Skunk Train, is a rail freight and heritage railroad transport railway in Mendocino County, California, United States, running from the railroad's headquarters in the coastal town of Fort Bragg to the interchange with the Northwestern Pacific Railroad at Willits.

The CWR runs steam- and diesel-powered trains and rail motor cars through Redwood forests along Pudding Creek and the Noyo River. Along the way, the tracks cross some 30 single bridges and trestles and pass through two deep mountain tunnels. The halfway point, short of Northspur, is a popular meal and beverage spot for the railroad's passengers.

== History ==
The railroad was originally built by the Fort Bragg Redwood Company as the Fort Bragg Railroad in 1885 to carry coast redwood logs from the dense forests at Glenela (Glen Blair) to a newly built lumber mill located 6.6 miles (10.6 km) to the west at coastal Fort Bragg. Fort Bragg Redwood Company was incorporated into the new Union Lumber Company in 1891; railroad ownership remained with the parent lumber company until 1969. Chinese tunnel builders completed 1,184-foot (361 m) Tunnel No. 1 from Pudding Creek to the Noyo River in 1893. Rails had been extended up the Noyo River to Alpine by 1904 when passenger service began with a stagecoach connection to the inland town of Willits. On July 1, 1905, the railroad was renamed the California Western Railroad & Navigation Company and shipped lumber on a fleet of steam schooners, first with wooden hulls and later with steel, until shipboard transportation of lumber ended in 1940.

List of CWR&NC Schooners
Name	Shipyards	Hull	Entered service	Service ended	Reason
Noyo	Humboldt Bay	Wood	1888	1914	Shipwrecked off Point Arena
Brunswick	Oregon	Wood	1903	1931	Sold
National City	Unknown	Wood	1906	1918	Sold in Peru
Arctic	Oregon	Wood	1908	1922	Shipwrecked off Point Arena
Coquille River	Oregon (Note: Built in 1896 and purchased later from original owner)	Wood	1908	1925	Sold
Noyo II	Seattle	Steel	1913	1935	Shipwrecked off Point Arena
Noyo III	Unknown	Steel	1935	1940	Sold in Thailand

Rails were gradually extended up the Noyo River headwall with a 3.3 percent grade and five 33-degree horseshoe curves with a railway distance of 6.5 miles (10.5 km) to climb 932 feet (284 m) over the straight-line distance of 1.5 miles (2.4 km) from Soda Springs to the summit. Completion of 795-foot (242 m) tunnel #2 on December 11, 1911 allowed interchange connection with the Northwestern Pacific Railroad at Willits, 40 rail miles (64 km) from Fort Bragg.

The rail connection to Fort Bragg was very popular for passengers traveling to and from San Francisco. Union Lumber Company selected premium grade clear redwood lumber (without knots) to build a Tyrolean Alps-style depot in 1916 where passengers changed trains at Willits. A Pullman car began operating between Fort Bragg and San Francisco in May, 1921; and this steam passenger train continued operating in addition to the Skunk railbus schedule until November, 1929.

In 1916 a 17.6-mile (28.3 km) logging branch line was built northward along the Pacific coast from Fort Bragg to the Ten Mile River and up the middle fork of the river to Camp 6. A 4.4-mile (7.1 km) branch extended up the north fork of the Ten Mile River to Clark Fork Landing. Trains brought logs from the Ten Mile River to the Fort Bragg sawmill until the rails were replaced by a road for logging trucks in 1949. Much of the former railroad grade between Fort Bragg and the Ten Mile River is presently used as a MacKerricher State Park coastal trail; and an unused trestle is visible from California State Route 1 on the beach at the mouth of Pudding Creek. The original rail line to Glen Blair operated as a branch line from Glen Blair Junction at the west portal of tunnel #1 until dismantled in 1942.

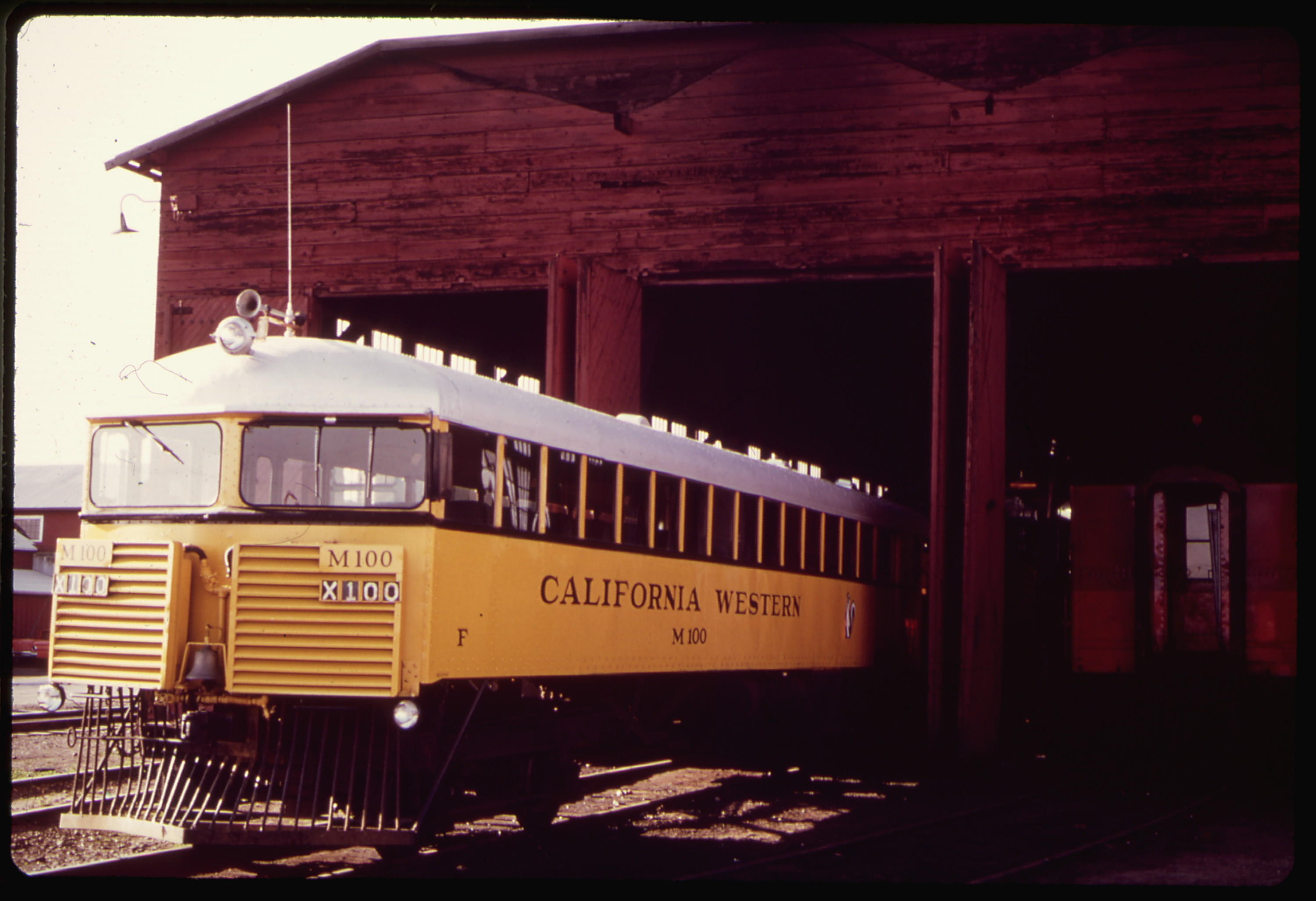
California Western Railroad gas railcar M100. May 1972.

On December 19, 1947, the railroad name was shortened to the California Western Railroad. In 1952, the railroad retired all of its steam locomotives in favor for diesel power. On September 26, 1964 westbound railcar M-80, carrying 32 members of San Mateo Masonic Lodge No. 226 on a sightseeing excursion, ran past its scheduled meeting place to collide head-on with eastbound railcar M-100, carrying 41 members of the Aircraft Pilot's Club of Oakland. The incident sent nine of the westbound occupants to the local hospital with serious injuries. Union Lumber and its California Western Railroad came under the ownership of the various lumber producers, including Boise Cascade (1969), and later Georgia-Pacific Corporation (G-P). A January 1970, derailment on the horseshoe curves destroyed diesel locomotives 51, 52 and 54. The engineer and fireman were able to jump clear when the air brakes failed on a downgrade train. G-P initially leased the CWR's operations to Kyle Railways, but in June 1987 the CWR was sold to the Kyle Railways subsidiary Mendocino Coast Railway. Mendocino Coast Railway continued to operate the CWR under the California Western name. No longer able to make a profit when the G-P mill began to reduce operations and finally closed altogether, Kyle Railways opted to sell the financially starved CWR. On December 17, 2003 the California Western Railroad was rescued when it was bought by the Sierra Railroad. The Skunk Train is owned and operated by Mendocino Railway, a subsidiary of the Sierra Railroad.

== Route ==
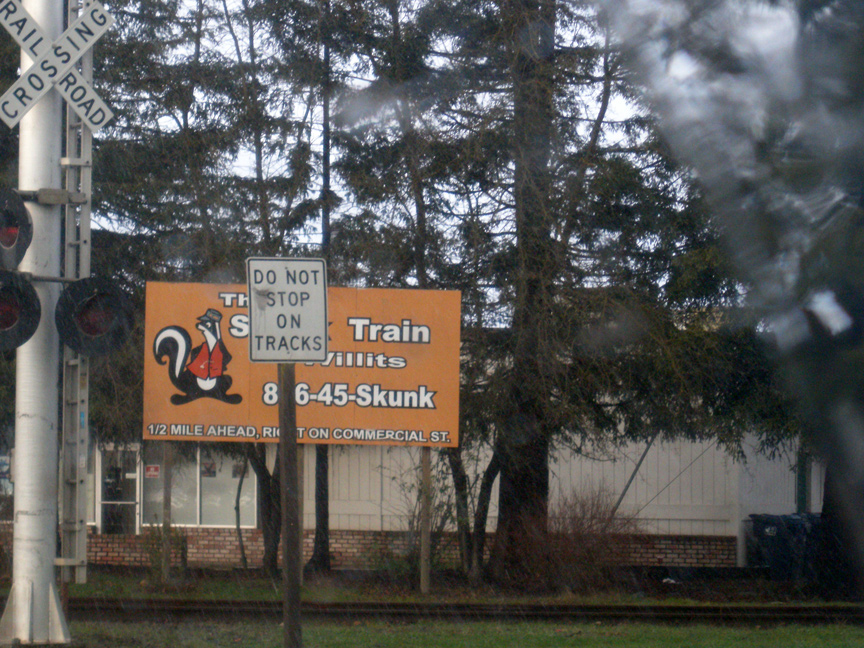
Road sign in Willits advertising the Skunk Train. Train tracks and warning signs in front.

Milepost	Feature	Notes
0	Fort Bragg	depot built in 1924
1.0	Pudding Creek	this pond was used as a water supply for the sawmill hydraulic debarker
3.4	Glen Blair Junction	1,122-foot (342 m) Tunnel #1 (currently closed)
6.6	South Fork	river gravel was collected here for use as track ballast
7.3	Rockpit	another source of track ballast
9.0	Ranch	Union Lumber Company raised beef and mutton here to feed their woods crews
10.0	Redwood Lodge	site of a resort destroyed by fire in 1963
12.7	Grove	
15.0	Camp 3	a logging camp
16.0	Camp 4	a logging camp
16.4	Camp Noyo	operated by Boy Scouts of America
18.1	Alpine	site of a hotel, school, and post office from 1905 until destroyed by fire in 1919
19.0	Camp Mendocino	operated by the Boys and Girls Club of San Francisco
20.0	Camp 7	a logging camp
20.5	Noyo Lodge	
21.3	Northspur	wye for turning trains
23.9	Irmulco	site of the Irvine & Muir Lumber Company town from 1908 to 1927
26.8	Shake City	site of a roofing shake manufacturing facility destroyed by fire in the 1950s
27.7	Burbeck	
28.7	Soda Springs	horseshoe curves
30.4	Clare Mill	horseshoe curve
32.6	Crowley	horseshoe curve
33.8	Crater	horseshoe curve
35.4	Summit	elevation 1,740 feet (530 m) in 795-foot (242 m) Tunnel #2
37.5	Rodgers	California State Route 20 grade crossing
38.6	Sage Spur	sawmill
40.0	Willits	historic redwood Tyrolean Alps-style depot

== Freight traffic ==
The railroad owned 199 freight cars in 1912, including 156 flatcars for logs and lumber, six tank cars for locomotive fuel oil, three boxcars, a stock car, and some ballast cars. California Western leased steel freight cars from other railroads when these wooden cars became unsuitable for interchange service. Most of the old wooden cars were scrapped when the Ten Mile River branch was dismantled in 1949, but a few remained in use for maintenance of way service and to move lumber around the Fort Bragg sawmill yard.

In the late 1980s, the railroad's freight redwood lumber traffic rapidly declined. Georgia-Pacific gradually shifted lumber shipments to more flexible highway trucks until the Northwestern Pacific Railroad [North Coast Railroad Authority] was embargoed and shut-down from Willits to the California Northern Railroad and Union Pacific mainline connection near the SF Bay Area. By 1996, before the NWP embargo, CWR lumber shipments were less than 500 cars per year and passenger service became the line's main source of revenue. All freight service was discontinued in 2001, and the Federal Railroad Administration's emergency order effectively cut the CWR off from the national rail network.

== Skunk Train ==
The No. 45 prepares for a journey in 1979.

Gas-powered, self-propelled, passenger railcars were added in 1925; and, after Pullman service was discontinued, CWR steam passenger trains ran only when the motorcars were out of service for maintenance. The passenger coaches were scrapped in 1949. The motorcars were nicknamed "Skunks" because people said, "You can smell 'em before you can see 'em." In 1965 the line reintroduced summer steam passenger service between Fort Bragg and Willits with "Super Skunk" Baldwin-built steam locomotive No.45 pulling four former Erie Lackawanna Railway 72-foot (22 m) Stillwell coaches built in 1926. That train was discontinued in 2001, then revived in September 2006. No. 45 continues to power excursion trains from Fort Bragg, California as far as Northspur, California, the CWR's midpoint, on selected weekends summer to early autumn.

Without the considerable revenue lumber and general merchandise freight once contributed to the bottom line, maintaining the railway through such rugged terrain is a major undertaking, both logistically and financially, and service is not always available for the full trip from Fort Bragg to Willits, California. However, shorter trips to intermediate points usually run year-round.

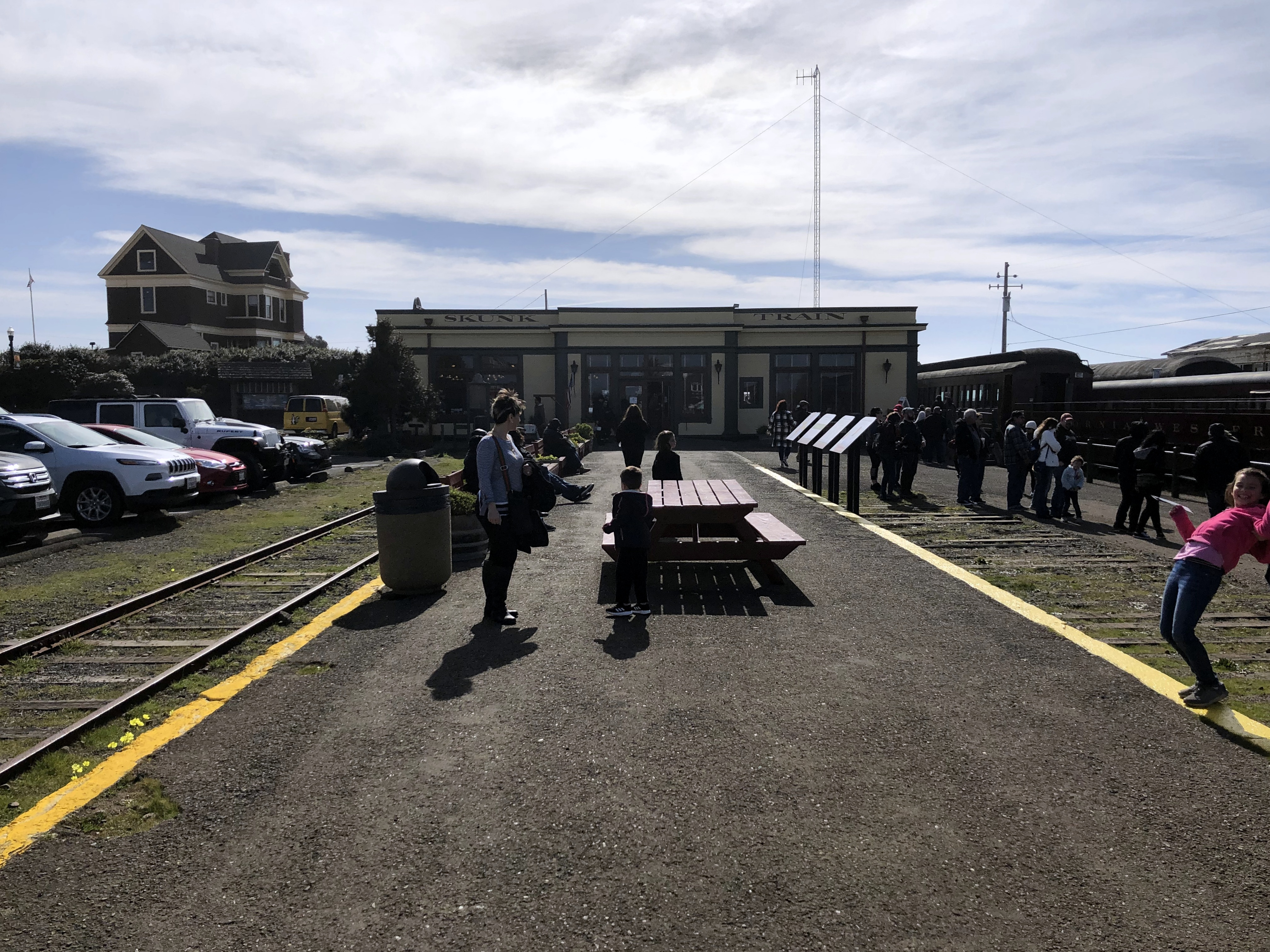
"Skunk Train" station in Fort Bragg

== Tunnel No. 1 closures ==
Beginning April 11, 2013, the railroad was in a crisis following the partial collapse of Tunnel No. 1 which buried nearly 50 feet (15 m) of its 1,200 feet (370 m) of track under rocks and soil, the third major collapse in the over 100-year-old tunnel's history. Without sufficient cash reserves to finance the excavation the railroad announced a fundraising campaign on June 7, selling lifetime passes and seeking private donations to meet a goal set at $300,000, the estimated cost to remove the blockage and repair the tunnel walls. The announcement explicitly stated that if some manner of external funding was not secured it would have no option but to cease operations permanently. On June 19, Save the Redwoods League announced an offer to pay the amount required to meet the fundraising goal in exchange for a conservation easement along the track's 40-mile (64 km) right-of-way. The acceptance of the offer allowed the railroad to resume full service in August 2013.

Tunnel No. 1 was once again closed in 2016 after sustaining damage from the 2015–16 El Nino, but the railway was left in a better position, having equipment at the Willits depot to allow the running of half-routes to the Northspur Junction and back (which was not the case during the 2013 crisis); trains from Fort Bragg are limited to running only 3.5 miles (5.6 km) to the Glen Blair Junction (one hour round trip) before returning to the depot, officially called the "Pudding Creek Express."

No announcements regarding the status of Tunnel No. 1 have been made since 2015, though the railroad is fully committed to its reopening. Both tunnel collapses were related to the hillside, which has a history of instability dating back to its construction in 1893.

Railbike tours began in 2018 as a response to the tunnel closures, with multiple other heritage railroads around the United States introducing their own railbike experiences after the California Western's railbikes proved very popular.

The railroad applied for a United States Department of Transportation BUILD grant in 2018 to fund tunnel repairs and replace over 30,000 ties made of chromated copper arsenate installed by Kyle Railways; this grant was denied in February 2019, but the request was reportedly in the top-third of those sent, and the Department of Transportation encouraged the railroad to re-apply. The railroad also planned to address deferred maintenance issues, and upgrade its tracks for commuter and freight service in anticipation of the reopening of the Northwestern Pacific to Willits and the potential extension of Sonoma–Marin Area Rail Transit (SMART) to Willits. Had the grant been approved, reconstruction of Tunnel No. 1 would have begun in 2019 and been completed by 2021, while tie replacement would have lasted until 2024.

The railroad planned to reopen the tunnel by the end of 2022, but as of May 2025, the tunnel remains closed. On January 29, 2024, the United States Department of Transportation announced that the Build America Bureau had provided a $31.4 million Railroad Rehabilitation and Improvement Financing (RRIF) loan to the Sierra Northern Railway and Mendocino Railway, which includes funding for the planned 2018 improvements. On May 6, 2024, the railroad announced that work to reopen Tunnel #1 would commence on May 28.

== Expansion plans ==
In 2019, the railroad purchased 77 acres (31 ha) of the former Fort Bragg Georgia-Pacific mill for redevelopment and extending service to a new terminal. In 2021, they acquired an additional 270-acre (110 ha) site from Georgia-Pacific. In 2025, the Railway agreed to a Memorandum of Understanding with the Fort Bragg City Council to guide future development of the site, which is expected to include a new station for the Skunk Train, an enclosed rail storage shed, and electric trolley service.

== Steam locomotives ==
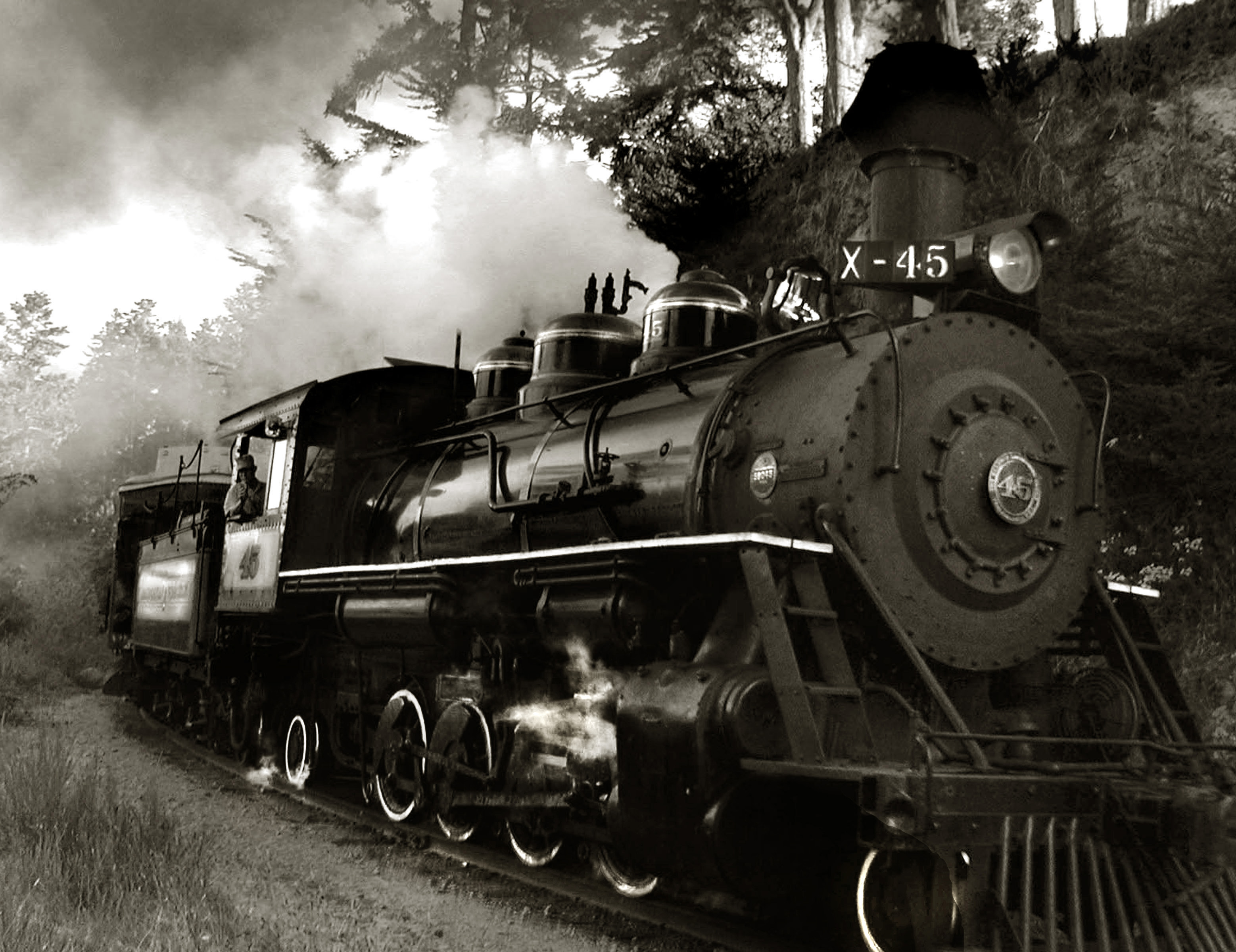
California Western Railroad #45 (builder #58045 of 1924), is a 2-8-2 "Mikado" locomotive still in use on the Skunk Train.

Number	Builder	Type	Build	Works number	Notes
1	Baldwin Locomotive Works	0-4-0T	1885	7831	purchased 1905 sold 1906 to Standish & Hickey Lumber
1st #2	Baldwin Locomotive Works	2-4-2T	1887	8852	purchased 1905 sold 1910 to Irvine-Muir Lumber
2nd #2	Baldwin Locomotive Works	0-4-2T	1901	18618	purchased 1911 from California State Belt Railroad scrapped 1920
3rd #2	Lima Locomotive Works	Shay geared	18 March 1907	1838	former Glen Blair Redwood Company #2; renumbered Union Lumber Company #2 in May 1929; scrapped 1950
3	Baldwin Locomotive Works	2-4-4T	1884		purchased 1895 sold 1918 to Mendocino Lumber Company
4	Hinkley Locomotive Works	4-4-0	1883		purchased from Southern Pacific Railroad 1904 scrapped 1914
5	Schenectady Locomotive Works	4-6-0	1880	2042	purchased 1906 scrapped 1923
6	Mason Machine Works	0-4-0	1868	245	purchased from Santa Fe Railroad 1908 sold 1910
7	Baldwin Locomotive Works	2-6-2T	1909	33390	renumbered #17 in 1924
8	McKay & Aldus	4-6-0	1869	2002	Built as Central Pacific 39, purchased 1910 from Southern Pacific, renumbered #38 in 1924
9	Lima Locomotive Works	Shay geared	27 May 1912	2547	sold 1917 to White River Lumber Company of Enumclaw, Washington
10	Lima Locomotive Works	Shay geared	6 April 1911	2419	built as Lima Locomotive Works demonstrator; sold 1917 to become Pacific Lumber Company #31
11	Baldwin Locomotive Works	2-6-2T	1913	39551	scrapped 1947
12	Baldwin Locomotive Works	2-6-2T	1914	41922	scrapped 1950
14	Baldwin Locomotive Works	2-6-2T	1924	58050	purchased from Fruit Growers Supply in 1938 sold 1956
17	Baldwin Locomotive Works	2-6-2T	1909	33390	former #7 renumbered in 1924
21	Baldwin Locomotive Works	2-6-2	1920	53277	sold 1950 to Pan-American Engineering
22	Baldwin Locomotive Works	2-6-2	1921	54878	scrapped 1952
23	Baldwin Locomotive Works	2-6-2	1923	57553	scrapped 1950
36	Baldwin Locomotive Works	4-6-0	~1890	9298	purchased from Colorado Midland Railroad in 1918 sold to Little River Redwood Company in 1929
38	McKay & Aldus	4-6-0	1869	2002	Former #8 renumbered 1924, scrapped 1941. The namesake of North Coast Brewing's beer, Old No. 38 Stout.
1st #41	Baldwin Locomotive Works	0-6-0	1901	18760	purchased 1922 scrapped 1937
2nd #41	Baldwin Locomotive Works	2-8-0	1920	53205	purchased from Sierra Railroad in 1940 scrapped 1950
44	Baldwin Locomotive Works	2-8-2	1930	61306	purchased from Lamm Lumber Company 1944 scrapped 1952
45	Baldwin Locomotive Works	2-8-2	1924	58045	purchased from Brownley Lumber Company 1964, operated until 2001, previously overhauled 2001–2004, currently undergoing an overhaul since 2015. Used on the Skunk Train.
46	Baldwin Locomotive Works	2-6-6-2	1937	62064	purchased from Rayonier 1968, on display at Pacific Southwest Railway Museum, restoration planned.

== Diesel locomotives ==
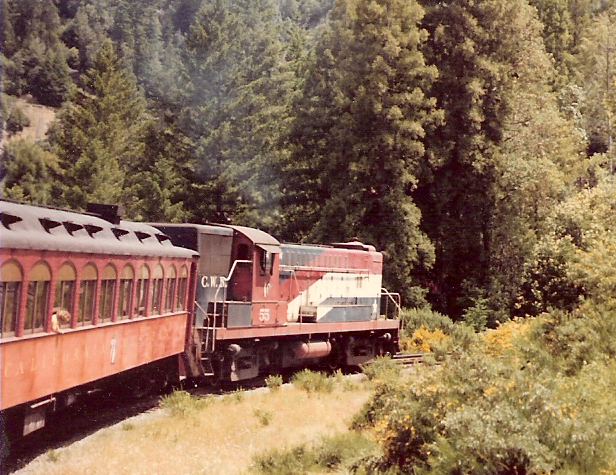
No. 55 decorated for the United States Bicentennial

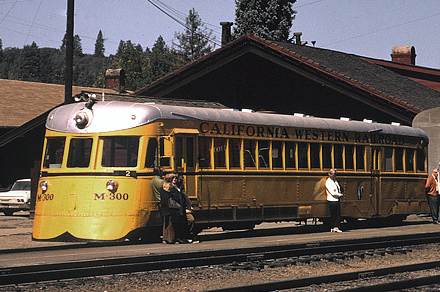
M-300 at Willits, 1970

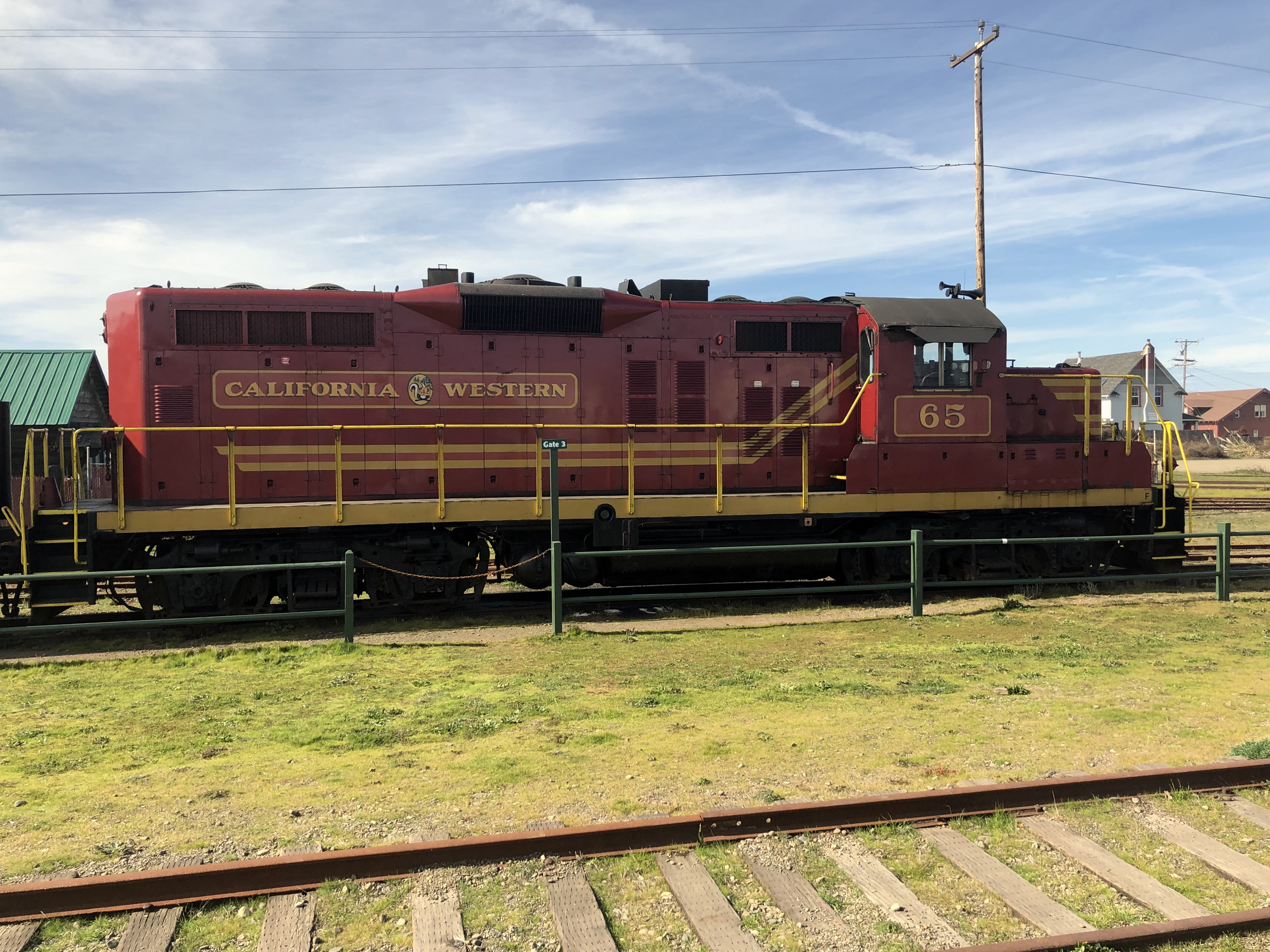
California Western #65

Number	Builder	Type	Date	Works number	Notes
51	Baldwin Locomotive Works	DS4-4-750	1949	74408	Acquired new 1949, wrecked 1970 and scrapped
52	Baldwin Locomotive Works	DS4-4-750	1949	74409	Acquired new 1949, wrecked 1970 and scrapped
53	Baldwin Locomotive Works	DS4-4-1000	1949	74193	ex-Pan American Engineering W8380; née Army Corps of Engineers W8380, acquired 1956, retired in 1985, to John Bradley, 1985; to Roots of Motive Power Collection
54	Baldwin Locomotive Works	S-12	1952/1953	75823	ex-NW (3307); née WAB 307, wrecked 1970 and scrapped
55	Baldwin Locomotive Works	RS-12	1955	76024	nee MR 32, acquired 1968, scrapped 1995
56	Baldwin Locomotive Works	RS-12	1955	76105	nee MR 33, acquired 1970, retired in 1985 to John Bradley, 1985; to Travel Town Museum (Los Angeles, CA)56
57	Baldwin Locomotive Works	S-12	1953	75914	nee SP 1539, acquired 1970, retired unknown
61	American Locomotive Works	RS-11	1955	Unknown	former SP, acquired 1976, status unknown
62	American Locomotive Works	RS-11	1955	Unknown	former SP, acquired 1976, sold to NVRR 1989
63	American Locomotive Works	RS-11	1955	Unknown	former SP, acquired 1976, status unknown
64	Electro-Motive Diesel	GP9	1955	Unknown	Former SP #3411. Operational and in regular service. Used occasionally on the Skunk Train.
65	Electro-Motive Diesel	GP9	1955	Unknown	Former SP #3412. Operational and in regular service. Used on the Skunk Train.
66	Electro-Motive Diesel	GP9	1956	Unknown	Former C&O #6145. Acquired 1998. Operational and in regular service. Used occasionally on the Skunk Train.
67	Electro-Motive Diesel	GP9	6/1954	19554	Built as Bangor and Aroostook Railroad #77; acquired 1998; never delivered; current location unknown
M-80	Mack	Railbus	1923	Unknown	Purchased 1925. Wrecked twice: in 1957 with a delivery truck, and in 1964 with M-100. Scrapped 1964
M-100	Edwards Rail Car Company	Motor Car	1925	Unknown	Acquired from Moorhead & North Forks Railroad; Operable. Recently repainted back to historic yellow scheme
M-200	Skagit Steel and Iron Works	Motor Car	1927	Unknown	Ex-TRC #22; née-LPN 20; to Niles Canyon Railway, 1975; Operable on Niles Canyon Railway
M-300	American Car and Foundry Company	Motor Car	1935	Unknown	Ex-Salt Lake, Garfield and Western Railway (SLGW); née Aberdeen and Rockfish Railroad #106; née Seaboard Air Line Railroad #2026; purchased 1963 and rebuilt to eliminate baggage section; Operable

== In popular culture ==
Pop singer Michelle Lambert performed weekly shows on the Skunk Train during her teenage years.

The railroad has also been featured in several movies, including The Signal Tower (1924), Racing with the Moon (1984), and The Majestic (2001). The M-300 railcar has appeared in all three games of the Transport Fever series, as the earliest multiple unit that can be built, even carrying the railroad's familiar skunk mascot.

== See also ==
- List of heritage railroads in the United States
