= Noyo River =

River in Mendocino County, California (USA) with its mouth at Fort Bragg

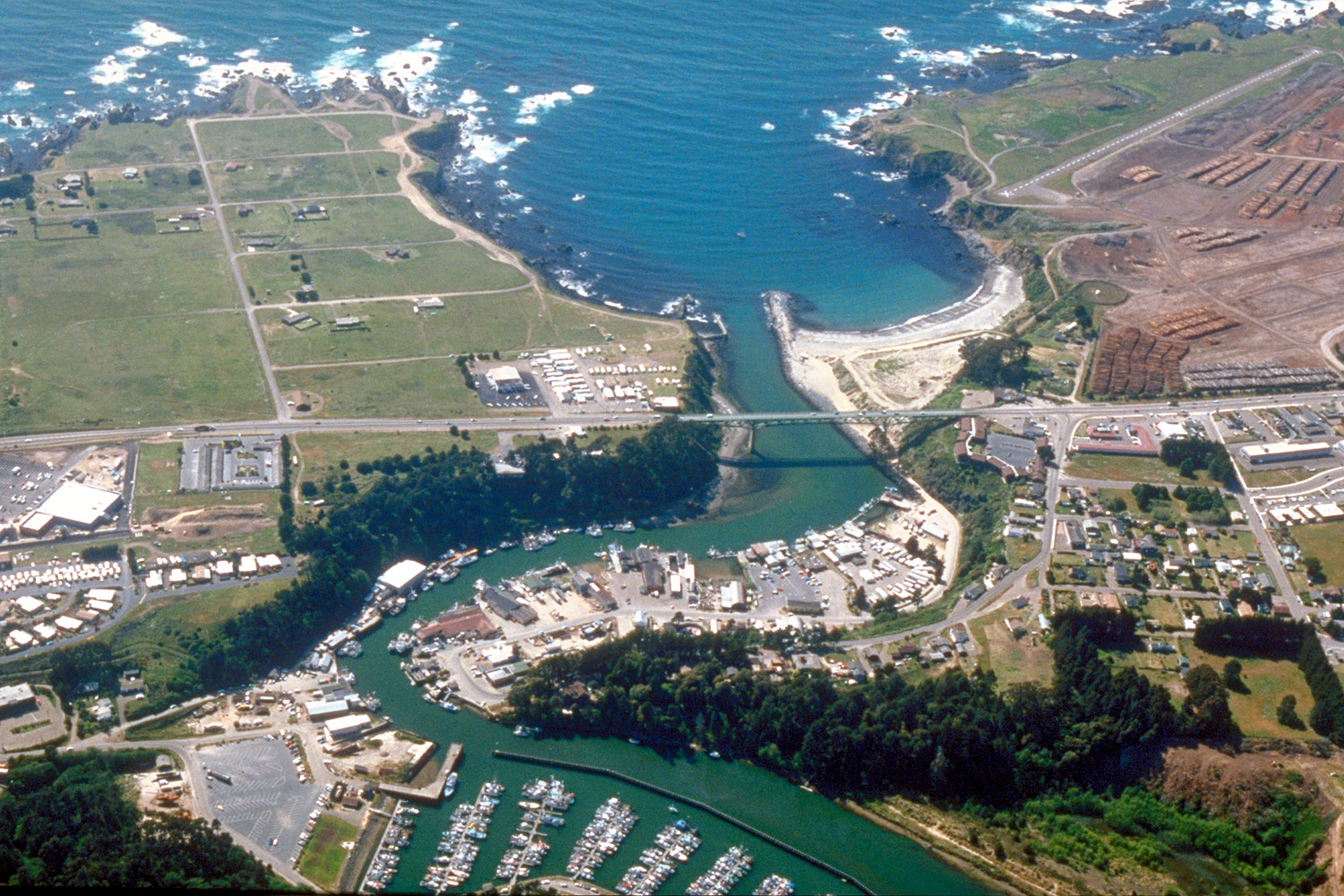
- Aerial view of the mouth of the Noyo River at Fort Bragg

- Location of mouth

Location
- Country: United States
- State: California
- Region: Mendocino County

Physical characteristics
- Source: Mendocino Range
  - location: 3 mi (5 km) west of Willits, California
  - coordinates: 39°24′17″N 123°25′20″W
  - elevation: 1,560 ft (480 m)
- Mouth: Pacific Ocean
  - location: Fort Bragg, California
  - coordinates: 39°25′40″N 123°48′33″W
  - elevation: 0 ft (0 m)
- Length: 30 mi (48 km)
- Basin size: 113 sq mi (290 km^{2})

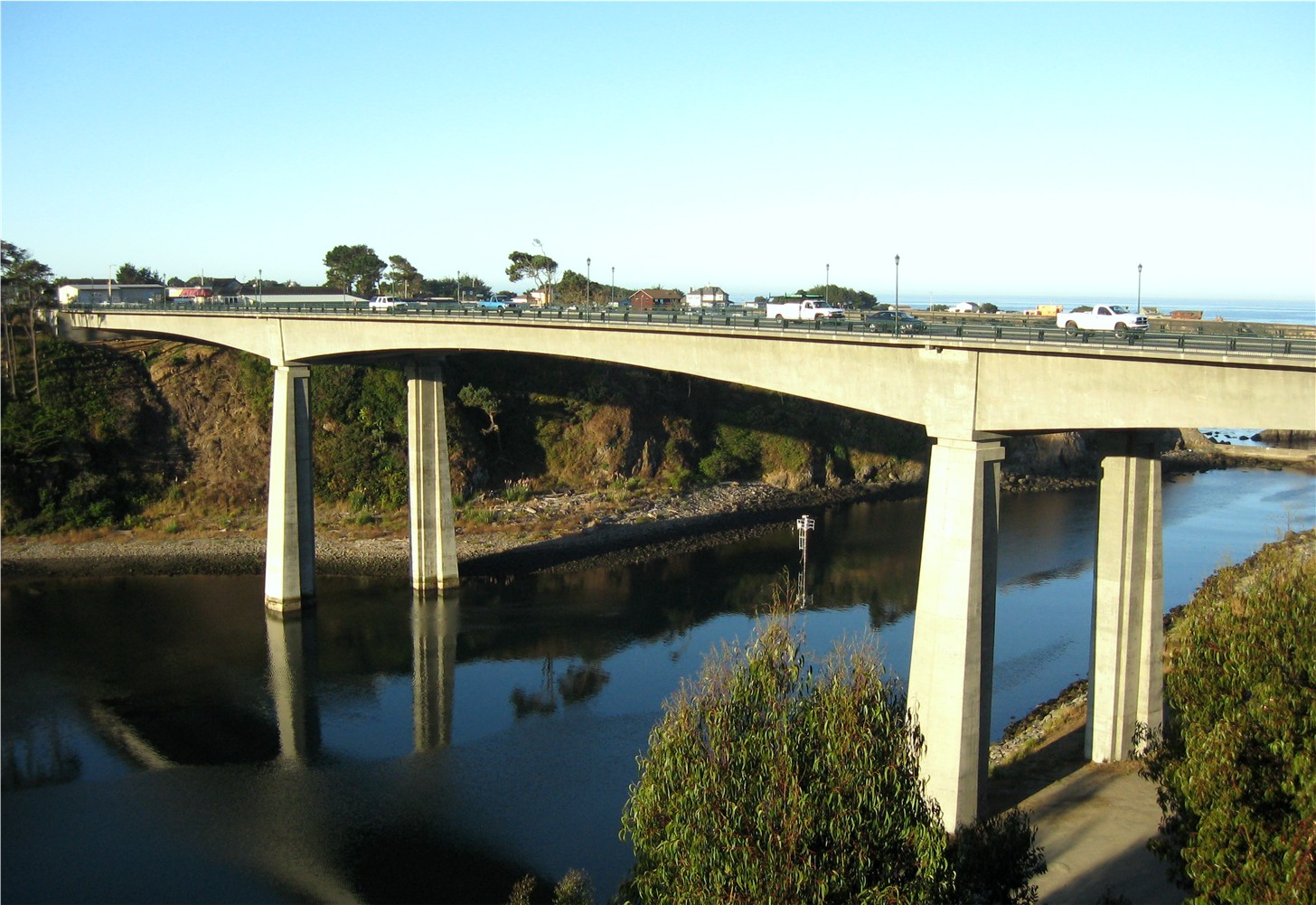
A new bridge was built in 2005

The Noyo River (Pomo: Chemli-bida) is a river on the north coast of California in Mendocino County. The river's headwaters are in the steep Mendocino Range, but downstream the river flows through gently sloping marine terraces before draining into the Pacific Ocean. The 113 square miles (290 km^{2}) watershed extends east to the small city of Willits and the river's mouth is at Noyo Harbor in Fort Bragg, which uses the river for drinking water; it is neighbored on the south by Hare Creek and the Big River, on the east by the South Fork Eel River, and on the north by Ten Mile River, named for its distance from the Noyo River. The average annual rainfall is between 40 inches (1,000 mm) and 65 inches (1,700 mm).

In the language of the Pomo people the Noyo River was Chemli-bida; the name "Noyo" referred to a village several miles north, on Pudding Creek, and by extension to the creek itself. European settlers transferred the name from Pudding Creek to the larger river to the south. The name Pudding Creek is thought to be a corruption of put-in creek - a term used by sailors to identify the uniquely sheltered mouth of the Noyo River. The two names were switched in the 1855 Coast Survey report.

The watershed has been logged for timber since the 19th century. Historical logging practices, particularly widespread clear-cutting, caused severe erosion, which led to excessive sediment buildup in the river and its tributaries. In addition, large woody debris that trapped sediment was removed from the streambed to improve flows. Noyo River estuary is recognized for protection by the California Bays and Estuaries Policy. In 1998, the river was listed as sediment impaired by the State of California North Coast Regional Water Quality Control Board. The watershed is slowly improving, but it is far from full recovery.

Timber production continues to be the primary land use in the watershed. About half of the land is owned by Mendocino Redwood Company and Hawthorne Timber Company, which bought its land from Georgia Pacific in 1999. Jackson Demonstration State Forest, owned by the California Department of Forestry and Fire Protection, makes up about one fifth of the watershed. The rest of the land is split into smaller parcels, such as ranches and private residences. Public land is largely limited to the state forest.

== Ecology ==
Aside from use for navigation, recreation and municipal and industrial water supply for the city of Fort Bragg, the river provides groundwater recharge and wildlife habitat including cold freshwater habitat for fish migration and spawning. Three anadromous fish species inhabit the Noyo River: steelhead (Oncorhynchus mykiss irideus), coho salmon (Oncorhynchus kisutch), and chinook salmon (Oncorhynchus tshawytscha), which are all listed under the Endangered Species Act. Steelhead and chinook are listed as threatened (2011), and coho listed as endangered (2011). Non-salmonid species in the watershed include the three-spined stickleback (Gasterosteus aculeatus), Pacific lamprey (Lampetra tridentata), and sculpin (Cottus spp.).

Birds of special concern include the marbled murrelet (Brachyramphus marmoratus) and northern spotted owl (Strix occidentalis caurina) because of their close association with old- growth and mature redwood forest, which has been heavily impacted by timber harvest since the late 19th century.

Eighty-two mammal species are predicted to be found in the Noyo River watershed including several rodents, bats, and squirrels, beaver (Castor canadensis), black bear (Ursus americanus), ring-tailed cat (Bassariscus astutus), American marten (Martes americana), fisher (Martes pennanti), weasels, American badger (Taxidea taxus), western spotted skunk (Spilogale gracilis) and striped skunk (Mephitis mephitis), mountain lion (Puma concolor), bobcat (Lynx rufus), seals and sea lions, mule deer (Odocoileus hemionus), and elk (Cervus elaphus). However, recent surveys have found no fishers or martens.

== Bridges ==
At least six bridges span the river, including:

- Noyo River Bridge at Noyo Cove, carrying the concurrence of State Route 1 and Main Street in Fort Bragg, a 875-foot (267 m) prestressed concrete bridge built in 2005
- on the Georgia-Pacific Haul Road or "A&W Logging Road" named after the A&W drive-in restaurant that used to be located at its intersection with Main Street
- on Park Road 320 near Road 300, a 64-foot (20 m) wooden bridge built in 1948
- on Park Road 360 north of Road 300, a 40-foot (12 m) wooden bridge built in 1958
- on a forest road just west of Jet Road 360, a 37-foot (11 m) wooden bridge
- on Forest Road 350 south of Road 300, a 26-foot (7.9 m) metal culvert built in 1987
- at Camp Noyo (a Boy Scout Resident Camp operated by the Redwood Empire Council), a wooden suspension bridge spans the river

There are at least 20 California Western Railroad crossings of the river visible in aerial photos.

The 6^{th} Noyo River Bridge, which opened in 2005, replaced a steel deck truss bridge that was built in 1948. State Route 1 is known as the Shoreline Highway or Pacific Coast Highway but within the Fort Bragg city limits it is concurrent with that town's Main Street and signed as such. Originally proposed in 1998, the bridge was redesigned with railings that allow scenic views to be seen from the bridge after local protest.

== See also ==
- California Western Railroad
- List of rivers in California
