= Fort Bragg, California =

City in California, United States

- City
- City of Fort Bragg
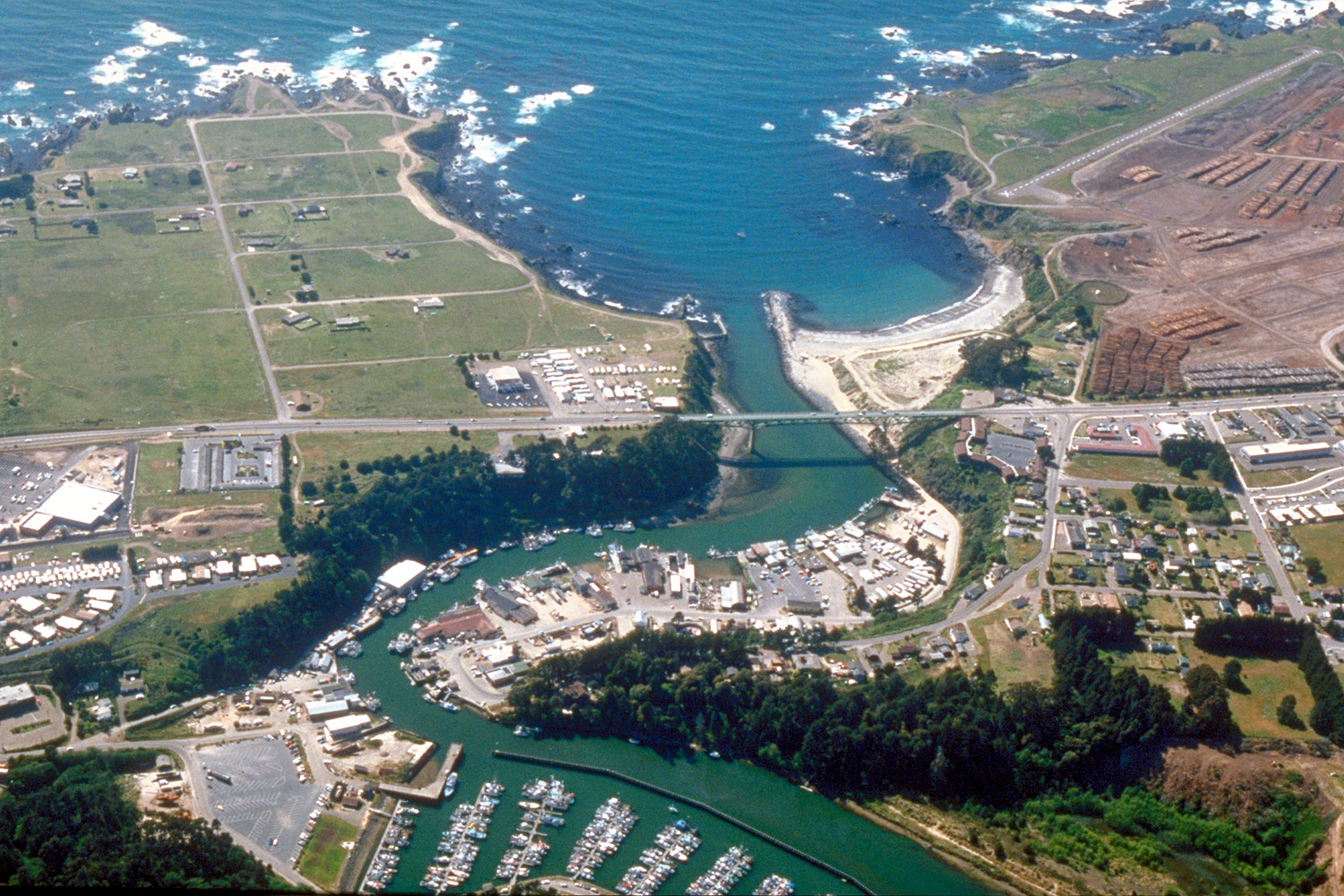

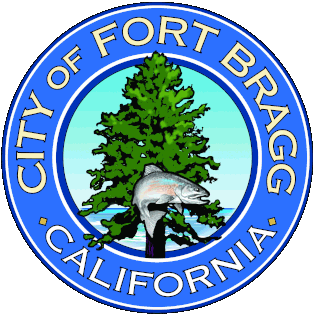
- Seal

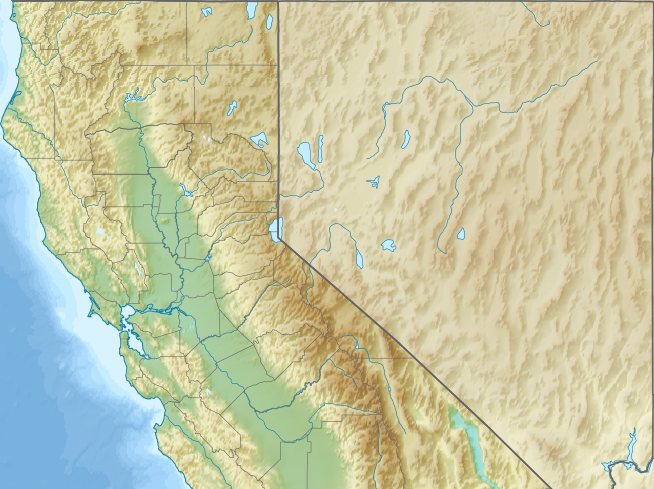
- Location within Northern California Location within the United States
- Coordinates (City Hall): 39.4457°N 123.8044°W
- Country: United States
- State: California
- County: Mendocino
- Founded as a military garrison: 1857; 169 years ago
- Incorporated: August 5, 1889; 137 years ago
- Named for: Braxton Bragg

Government
  - Type: Council–manager
  - Body: City council
  - Mayor: Jason Godeke
  - Vice Mayor: Marcia Rafanan
  - Councilmembers: Tess Albin-Smith; Scott Hockett; Lindy Peters

Area
  - Total: 2.93 sq mi (7.59 km^{2})
  - Land: 2.90 sq mi (7.51 km^{2})
  - Water: 0.035 sq mi (0.09 km^{2}) 1.14%

Dimensions
  - Length: 3.6 mi (5.8 km)
  - Width: 1.95 mi (3.14 km)
- Elevation: 85 ft (26 m)

Population (2020)
  - Total: 6,983
  - Density: 2,410/sq mi (930/km^{2})
- Demonym: Fort Bragger
- Time zone: UTC−8 (Pacific Time Zone)
  - Summer (DST): UTC−7 (PDT)
- ZIP code: 95437
- Area code: 707, 369
- FIPS code: 06-25058
- GNIS feature IDs: 1656027, 2410525
- City Manager: Isaac Whippy
- City Clerk: Diana Paoli
- Police Chief: Neil Cervenka
- Fire Chief: Steve Orsi
- Website: www.fortbraggca.gov

California Historical Landmark
- Official name: Fort Bragg
- Designated: July 24, 1957
- Reference no.: 615

Fort Bragg is a city along the North Coast of California in Mendocino County. The city is 24 miles (39 km) west of Willits, at an elevation of 85 feet (26 m). Its population was 6,983 at the 2020 census.

Location in Mendocino County and California

Fort Bragg is a tourist destination because of its views of the Pacific Ocean. Among its points of interest are Glass Beach and the California Western Railroad (popularly known as the "Skunk Train").

A California Historical Landmark, Fort Bragg was founded in 1857 prior to the American Civil War as a military garrison rather than a fortification. It was named after army officer Braxton Bragg, who at the time had served the U.S. in the Mexican–American War (and would later serve in the Confederate Army during the Civil War). The city was incorporated in 1889.

== History ==
The area known as Fort Bragg was home to Native Americans since before Western expansion, most of whom belong to the Pomo tribe. They historically were hunter-gatherers who lived along the northern coast of California.

=== 1855–1867 ===
In 1855, an exploration party from the Bureau of Indian Affairs visited the area looking for a site on which to establish a reservation; in the spring of 1856, the Mendocino Indian Reservation was established at Noyo. It was 25,000 acres (100 km^{2}) in size, and its boundary extended north from what became Simpson Lane to Abalobadiah Creek and east from the Pacific Ocean to Bald Hill.

In the summer of 1857, 1st Lt. Horatio G. Gibson, then serving at the Presidio of San Francisco, established a military post on the reservation, approximately one and a half miles (2.4 km) north of the Noyo River, and named it for his former commanding officer Capt. Braxton Bragg, who later became a General in the Army of the Confederacy.

Gibson and Company M, 3rd Artillery, left Fort Bragg in January 1859 to be replaced by Company D, 6th Infantry, which stayed for two years and continued to build up the post.

In June 1862, Company D, 2nd California Infantry, were ordered to garrison the post and remained until 1864. In October of that year, the Fort Bragg garrison was loaded aboard the steamer Panama and completed the evacuation and abandonment of Mendocino County's first military post.

The Mendocino Indian Reservation was discontinued in March 1866, and the land was opened for settlement three years later.

The last remaining building of the Fort Bragg military post is located at 430 North Franklin Street. It may have been the Quartermaster's storehouse and commissary or surgeon's quarters or hospital.

The approximate boundaries of the fort extend from the south side of Laurel, east from the railroad depot to the carriage road behind Franklin, down the lane to a point 100 feet (30 m) south of Redwood Avenue, west on Redwood to just beyond the Georgia-Pacific Corporation company offices, then north to connect with the Laurel Street border at the railroad station.

=== 1867–1892 ===
By 1867, the reservation and military outpost at Fort Bragg were abandoned. By 1869, small lumber mills were being built at the mouth of every creek. Ranches were settled. By 1873, Fort Bragg had an established lumber port at Noyo.

In 1869, after the fort was abandoned, and the land surveyed by the U.S. Geological Survey, the land of the reservation was returned to the public and offered for sale at $1.25 per acre to settlers. In 1885, C. R. Johnson who, with partners Calvin Stewart and James Hunter, had been operating a sawmill in Mill Creek on the Ten Mile River, moved their mill machinery to Fort Bragg to take advantage of the harbor for shipping.

The company incorporated in 1885 as the Fort Bragg Redwood Company. In 1891, after merging with the Noyo River Lumber Company, it was renamed the Union Lumber Company.

The Fort Bragg Railroad was founded to haul logs to the mill. The first rails were run up Pudding Creek and, in 1887, reached Glen Blair. A San Francisco streetcar was purchased to carry loggers and their families on Sunday excursions to the woods.

Fort Bragg was incorporated in 1889 with C. R. Johnson as its first mayor, and Calvin Stewart drafting its plat maps.

Built in Fort Bragg for Horace Weller in 1886, the Weller House is the oldest existing house in the city. Since 1999, this house, converted into a hotel, has welcomed tourists from around the world.

=== 1893–1916 ===
The Union Lumber Company was incorporated in 1891 by absorbing some of the smaller lumber companies in the area. Some of the new company lands were in the Noyo River watershed east of Fort Bragg making removal of logs difficult by rail, unless a tunnel was built. Johnson hired experienced Chinese tunnel builders from San Francisco. After completion of the tunnel, most of the Chinese settled in Fort Bragg and Mendocino. A six-walled Chinese town was built at Redwood and McPherson. Older residents say that eventually most of the Chinese children moved elsewhere.

In 1901, the Union Lumber Company incorporated the National Steamship Company to carry lumber, passengers and supplies. As the only link to manufactured creature comforts, staples like sugar and coffee were delivered by steamship. In 1905, the California Western Railroad and Navigation Company was established and plans were pushed to get the rail line all the way to Willits, where train connections to the Northwestern Pacific would link to San Francisco.

The 1906 earthquake resulted in a fire that threatened the saw mill and the city. Within Fort Bragg itself, all brick buildings were damaged. Only two were not destroyed completely. Many frame houses were knocked off their piers. The fire downtown burned the entire block bordered by Franklin, Redwood and McPherson Streets, plus the west side of Franklin. The west Franklin block burned down to approximately one half a block beyond the intersection of Redwood and Franklin.

After the earthquake, most downtown reconstruction was completed within 12 months. Coincidentally, the earthquake brought prosperity to Fort Bragg as the mills furnished lumber to rebuild San Francisco, and the lumber ships returning from San Francisco were ballasted with bricks used for rebuilding Fort Bragg. With the new prosperity, the rail line to Willits was completed and in 1912 the first tourists came to Fort Bragg. By 1916 Fort Bragg had become a popular place to visit—and to settle.

=== Since 1916 ===
Commercial fishing has also played an important role in the economic base of the community. Once a major commercial fishing port, Fort Bragg was well known for producing quality fish products that were distributed to major metropolitan markets.

In 1916, the Union Lumber Company built a railroad from the South Fork of Ten Mile River to Fort Bragg, where its operations were. By 1929, what lumber could not be sent by rail to the company mill at Fort Bragg was handled by the mill at Pudding Creek owned by the Glen Blair Redwood Company. The Union Lumber Company established its own post office on Churchman Creek to service its logging camps there in 1931, but it operated only until 1932. The railroad was removed in 1945 as rail transport was replaced by truck haulage; nowadays it is a recreational corridor in MacKerricher State Park.

In 1969, the Union Lumber Company was purchased by Boise Cascade and John Quincy and it became Georgia Pacific Lumber Company in 1973. The mill was shut down in 2002 after being identified as a nonperforming asset. The 400-acre (1.6 km^{2}) piece of property within the city limits takes up almost the entire coastline of Fort Bragg, including Fort Bragg Landing.

As of July 2017, the mill site was sold and is undergoing redevelopment, including removal of toxic waste.

==== Calls to rename the city ====
In 2015, members of the California Legislative Black Caucus petitioned Fort Bragg to change its name due to Braxton Bragg having been a Confederate general. The mayor of Fort Bragg at that time, Lindy Peters, stated that there was not really much interest among the residents, and cited the costs that every company and institution in the area would have to pay to change all of the addresses.

There were further calls to change the name in June 2020, following the murder of George Floyd. On June 22, the Fort Bragg City Council considered whether to put a proposition on the November ballot asking its residents if they would like a name change, but decided instead to form an ad hoc committee to explore options for the city's name. They estimated the cost to change the name would be $271,000. Among the alternative options that were explored was to simply rededicate the city to a different notable person named Bragg. By late January 2022, the commission announced that it could not come to a consensus on a name change. Meanwhile in 2022, the active military fort of the same name in North Carolina was renamed to Fort Liberty. The military fort has been renamed back to Fort Bragg since 2025, although officially named for Roland L. Bragg, a World War II US Army paratrooper.

== Geography ==
Fort Bragg has an average elevation of 85 ft (26 m) above sea level.

According to the United States Census Bureau, the city has a total area of 2.9 square miles (7.5 km^{2}), of which 2.9 square miles (7.5 km^{2}) is land and 0.03 square miles (0.078 km^{2}), comprising 1.14%, is water.

== Climate ==
Due to Fort Bragg's location on the shore of the Pacific Ocean, the city has very mild weather throughout the year compared to most inland places. Most of the rainfall occurs from November to April with some occasional drizzle or light showers during the summer. Fog and low overcast are common, especially during the night and early morning hours. The climate experienced in Fort Bragg is classified as warm-summer Mediterranean climate (Köppen: Csb). Although formally known as dry-summer subtropical, Fort Bragg has very cool summer temperatures for a subtropical climate type. Its Mediterranean classification is due to the dry summers with very little rainfall.

Freezing temperatures occur on an average of 11.6 days annually. The record maximum temperature was 91 °F (32.8 °C) on October 5, 1987. The record minimum temperature was 18 °F (−7.8 °C) on December 21, 1990, and in 2016 there was an ice storm. Winter days always remain well above freezing. The coldest day on record was 39 °F (4 °C) in 1972 and the coolest day of the year reached 44 °F (7 °C) on average during the 1991–2020 normals. The warmest night of the year averages a moderate 58 °F (14 °C) and no overnight low has ever been recorded above 66 °F (19 °C).

Average annual precipitation is 43.16 inches (1,096 mm). The wettest "rain year" on record was from July 1997 to June 1998 with at least 79.13 inches (2,009.9 mm) and the driest from July 1976 to June 1977 with 14.90 inches (378.5 mm). The maximum precipitation in one month was 27.02 inches (686.3 mm) in January 1909. The maximum 24-hour rainfall was 4.72 inches (119.9 mm) on February 6, 2015.

Snow has only ever been recorded on three days, the largest recorded total being 3 inches (7.6 cm) on December 6, 1913, the second being 2 inches (5.1 cm) on January 6, 1907, and the third being 0.5 inches (1.3 cm) on January 12, 1907.

The extreme maritime effect of the Pacific Ocean is demonstrated by the fact that Fort Bragg has uniquely cool summers for cities on the 39th parallel north, both domestically and internationally. To illustrate the extremes of Fort Bragg, coastal climates with warmer summers than the city are found as far north as on the 66th latitude on the Bothnia Bay in between Sweden and Finland, a net latitudinal anomaly of 27 degrees. That is nearly one-third of the distance between the poles and the equator. In places some miles inland, consistently hotter summer temperatures are found, a phenomenon typical of the Californian coastline.

Climate data for Fort Bragg, California, 1991–2020 normals, extremes 1895–present
Month	Jan	Feb	Mar	Apr	May	Jun	Jul	Aug	Sep	Oct	Nov	Dec	Year
Record high °F (°C)	77 (25)	80 (27)	82 (28)	80 (27)	81 (27)	84 (29)	83 (28)	83 (28)	87 (31)	91 (33)	85 (29)	81 (27)	91 (33)
Mean maximum °F (°C)	63.8 (17.7)	65.2 (18.4)	66.4 (19.1)	69.2 (20.7)	70.3 (21.3)	73.3 (22.9)	73.9 (23.3)	74.7 (23.7)	76.1 (24.5)	76.7 (24.8)	67.1 (19.5)	60.9 (16.1)	76.7 (24.8)
Mean daily maximum °F (°C)	51.6 (10.9)	53.8 (12.1)	55.0 (12.8)	57.2 (14.0)	60.1 (15.6)	63.0 (17.2)	65.0 (18.3)	65.2 (18.4)	64.7 (18.2)	61.5 (16.4)	55.9 (13.3)	51.5 (10.8)	58.7 (14.8)
Daily mean °F (°C)	45.9 (7.7)	47.1 (8.4)	48.0 (8.9)	49.8 (9.9)	52.6 (11.4)	55.2 (12.9)	57.0 (13.9)	57.4 (14.1)	56.7 (13.7)	53.8 (12.1)	49.3 (9.6)	45.7 (7.6)	51.5 (10.9)
Mean daily minimum °F (°C)	40.3 (4.6)	40.5 (4.7)	41.0 (5.0)	42.4 (5.8)	45.1 (7.3)	47.3 (8.5)	49.0 (9.4)	49.7 (9.8)	48.7 (9.3)	46.1 (7.8)	42.6 (5.9)	39.8 (4.3)	44.4 (6.9)
Mean minimum °F (°C)	31.0 (−0.6)	31.8 (−0.1)	33.3 (0.7)	34.6 (1.4)	38.5 (3.6)	41.7 (5.4)	44.5 (6.9)	44.7 (7.1)	42.2 (5.7)	38.1 (3.4)	32.9 (0.5)	30.8 (−0.7)	28.5 (−1.9)
Record low °F (°C)	24 (−4)	24 (−4)	28 (−2)	30 (−1)	29 (−2)	36 (2)	38 (3)	30 (−1)	34 (1)	25 (−4)	26 (−3)	18 (−8)	18 (−8)
Average precipitation inches (mm)	7.66 (195)	7.27 (185)	6.43 (163)	3.60 (91)	1.57 (40)	0.74 (19)	0.07 (1.8)	0.10 (2.5)	0.25 (6.4)	2.26 (57)	4.55 (116)	8.66 (220)	43.16 (1,096.7)
Average precipitation days (≥ 0.01 in)	15.6	13.8	14.8	11.0	7.3	3.2	2.1	2.7	3.6	6.7	13.3	16.7	110.8
Source 1: NOAA
Source 2: National Weather Service

== Demographics ==
Historical population
Census	Pop.	Note	%±
1890	945		—
1900	1,590		68.3%
1910	2,408		51.4%
1920	2,616		8.6%
1930	3,022		15.5%
1940	3,235		7.0%
1950	3,826		18.3%
1960	4,433		15.9%
1970	4,455		0.5%
1980	5,019		12.7%
1990	6,078		21.1%
2000	7,026		15.6%
2010	7,273		3.5%
2020	6,983		−4.0%
U.S. Decennial Census

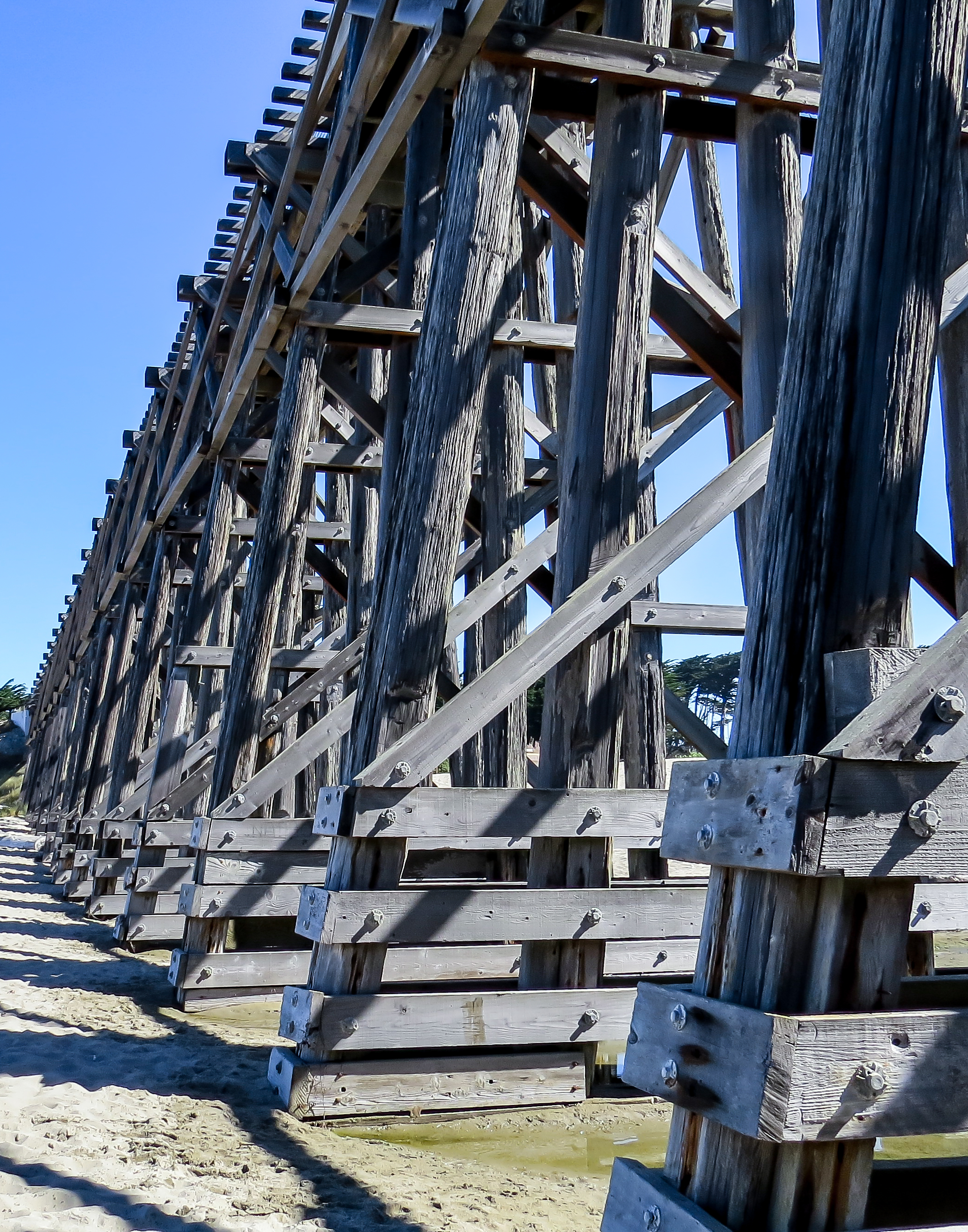
Pudding Creek Trestle

=== 2020 census ===
As of the 2020 census, Fort Bragg had a population of 6,983 and a population density of 2,408.8 inhabitants per square mile (930.0/km^{2}). The census reported that 98.0% of the population lived in households, 1.3% lived in non-institutionalized group quarters, and 0.8% were institutionalized. 99.6% of residents lived in urban areas, while 0.4% lived in rural areas.

The age distribution was 20.9% under the age of 18, 6.8% aged 18 to 24, 24.3% aged 25 to 44, 25.2% aged 45 to 64, and 22.7% who were 65 years of age or older. The median age was 43.3 years. For every 100 females there were 92.9 males, and for every 100 females age 18 and over there were 90.8 males age 18 and over.

There were 2,960 households in Fort Bragg, of which 27.8% had children under the age of 18 living in them. Of all households, 34.2% were married-couple households, 9.0% were cohabiting couple households, 22.0% were households with a male householder and no spouse or partner present, and 34.9% were households with a female householder and no spouse or partner present. About 37.9% of all households were made up of individuals and 19.2% had someone living alone who was 65 years of age or older. The average household size was 2.31. There were 1,637 families (55.3% of all households).

There were 3,280 housing units at an average density of 1,131.4 units per square mile (436.8 units/km^{2}). Of these, 2,960 (90.2%) were occupied and 9.8% were vacant. The homeowner vacancy rate was 1.2% and the rental vacancy rate was 3.3%. Of occupied units, 41.3% were owner-occupied and 58.7% were occupied by renters.

Racial composition as of the 2020 census
Race	Number	Percent
White	4,359	62.4%
Black or African American	49	0.7%
American Indian and Alaska Native	205	2.9%
Asian	112	1.6%
Native Hawaiian and Other Pacific Islander	11	0.2%
Some other race	1,134	16.2%
Two or more races	1,113	15.9%
Hispanic or Latino (of any race)	2,235	32.0%

=== Income and poverty ===
In 2023, the US Census Bureau estimated that the median household income was $53,580, and the per capita income was $32,971. About 8.0% of families and 15.0% of the population were below the poverty line.

== Parks and recreation ==
A trail that extends over a mile along the coast from the Noyo River Headlands north along the bluff over the Pacific Ocean reaches the former Georgia-Pacific mill site. It is accessible from Highway 1 (Main Street) at Cypress Street. The trail includes information signage about the area's pre-European residents, the Pomo Native Americans. The trail leads to a visitor center maintained by the Noyo Center for Marine Science. Offshore along the trail are rocks where harbor seals haul out and other sealife may be viewed.

== Arts and culture ==
Built in 1892, the Guest House Museum served as lodging for the owners of Union Lumber Company, VIP visitors, and potential buyers of ULCO products. It has become the headquarters of the Fort Bragg-Mendocino Coast Historical Society, where visitors learn about the history of the area.

The Mendocino Coast Botanical Gardens is a 47-acre (190,000 m^{2}) garden along the coastal bluffs.

=== Glass Beach ===
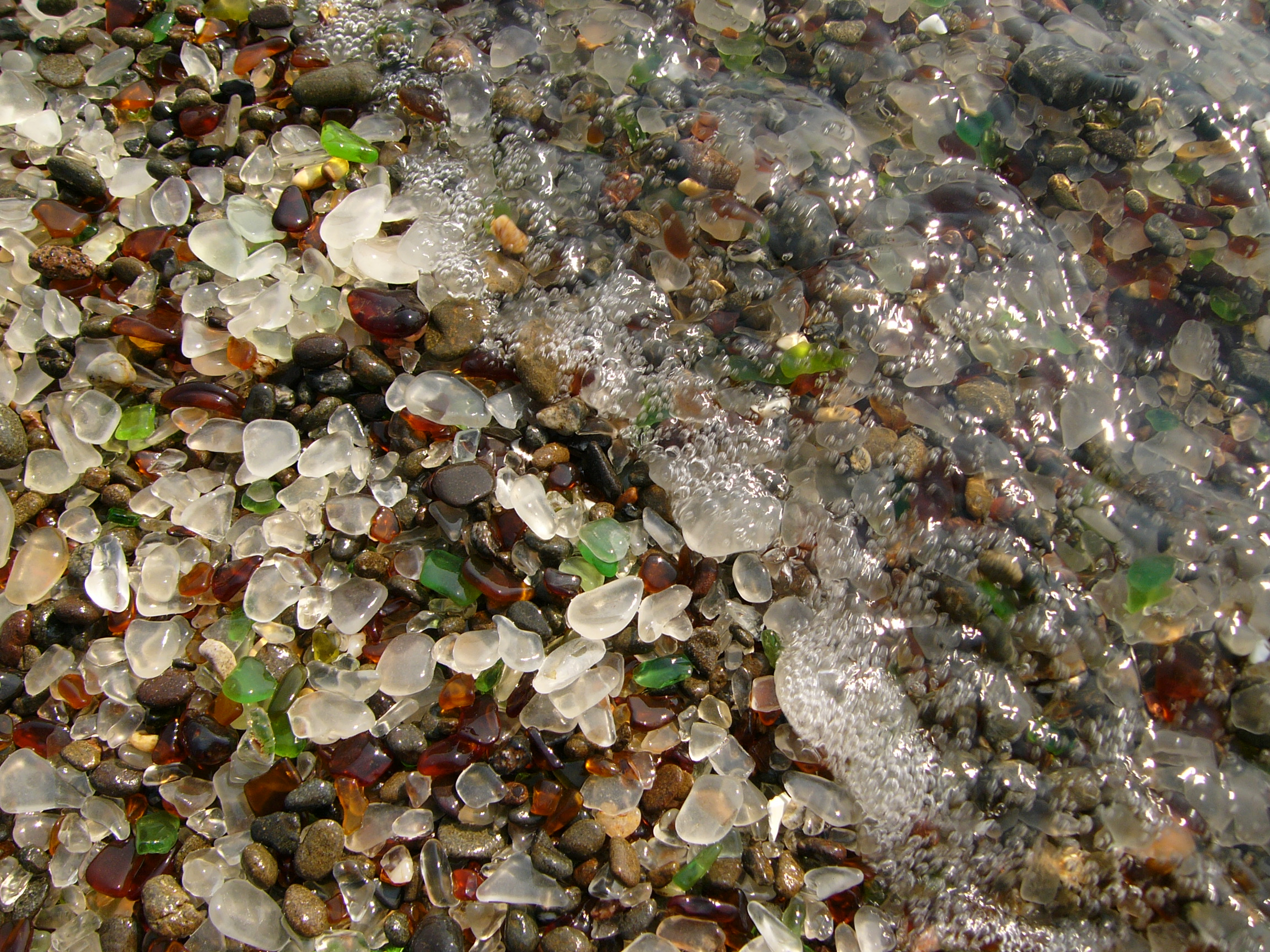
Glass Beach in Fort Bragg

Glass Beach is on the edge of Fort Bragg, along the ocean. In the early 20th century, Fort Bragg residents threw their household garbage over cliffs owned by the Union Lumber Company onto what is now Glass Beach, discarding glass, appliances, and even vehicles. Locals referred to it as "The Dumps". Fires were lit to reduce the size of the trash pile. In 1967, city leaders closed the area and various cleanup programs were brought on through the years to fix the damage. Over several decades the pounding waves wore down the discarded glass into the small, smooth pieces called sea glass that coat the beach. The area along the beach at the end of Elm Street is now visited by tourists.

=== Other points of interest ===
- The Pudding Creek Trestle
- Noyo Harbor
- MacKerricher State Park
- Russian Gulch State Park
- Point Cabrillo Light

== Transportation ==
Fort Bragg is the western terminus of the California Western Railroad (otherwise known locally as the "Skunk Train"). Steam passenger service was started in 1904, and then extended in 1911 through the Coast Redwood forests to the city of Willits, 40 miles (64 km) inland. Started in 1885 as a rail route for moving large logs to the mills, the Skunk Train now offers scenic tours through the redwoods. In 1925 self-powered, yellow "Skunk" rail cars were inaugurated. The little trains were quickly nicknamed for their original gas engines, which prompted folks to say, "You can smell 'em before you can see 'em." In 1965 the line reintroduced summer steam passenger service between Fort Bragg and Willits with Baldwin-built steam locomotives Nos. 45 and 46, calling the colorful train "The Super Skunk". That train was discontinued in 2001 due to owing to the embargo of the Northwestern Pacific Railroad, then revived in September 2006 as a special event train, currently the most popular attraction for tourists in the Fort Bragg region. No.45 and 46 are now out of service waiting for overhaul. Trains continue with diesel locomotives used to power excursion trains from Fort Bragg as far as Northspur, the CWR's midpoint, on selected weekends from summer to early autumn.

Preceding station	California Western Railroad	Following station
Terminus	Skunk Train	Northspur toward Willits

State Route 1 (the Pacific Coast Highway) passes through Fort Bragg, concurrent with and signed as Main Street within the city limits. It travels on two bridges while doing so, the Noyo River Bridge and the Pudding Creek Bridge. State Route 20's western terminus is in Fort Bragg at its junction with Route 1, traveling east it runs parallel and several miles south of the Skunk Train's route to Willits and beyond to Nevada City before terminating at a junction with Interstate 80.

The city also has a small private airport, with an 1,850 ft × 60 ft (564 m × 18 m) paved runway.

== Government ==
=== Municipal government ===
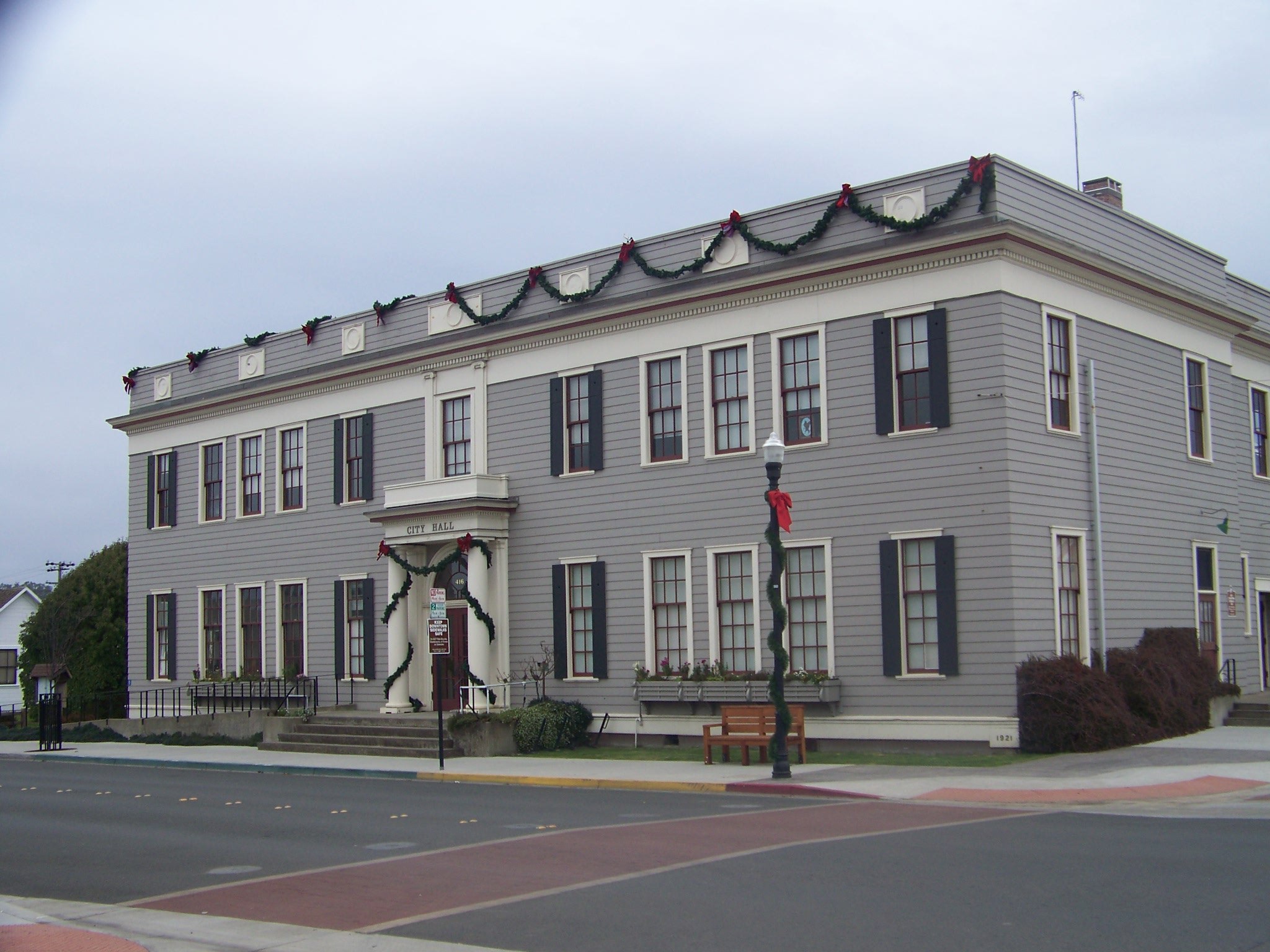
Fort Bragg City Hall

- Mayor: Jason Godeke (term expires December 2026)
- Vice Mayor: Marcia Rafanan (term expires December 2026)
- Councilmembers:
  - Tess Albin-Smith (term expires December 2026)
  - Scott Hockett (term expires December 2028)
  - Lindy Peters (term expires December 2028)
- City Manager: Isaac Whippy (hired January 2024)

=== State and federal representation ===
In the state legislature, Fort Bragg is in the 2nd senatorial district, represented by Democrat Mike McGuire, and the 2nd Assembly district, represented by Democrat Chris Rogers.

Federally, Fort Bragg is in California's 2nd congressional district, represented by Democrat Jared Huffman.

== Education ==
Children in Fort Bragg are served by the Fort Bragg Unified School District, typically attending Fort Bragg High School, Fort Bragg Middle School, Dana Gray Elementary and Redwood Elementary during their time in the public school system, though several alternative schools are available as well. In 2006, Three Rivers Learning Center, a charter school under the jurisdiction of Mattole Valley Charter School opened.

== In popular culture ==
Several major movies have been filmed in and around Fort Bragg, including:

- Johnny Belinda (1948), a drama, based on the Broadway hit of the same name, starring Jane Wyman
- The Russians Are Coming! The Russians Are Coming! (1966), a comedy about a Soviet submarine that accidentally runs aground off the coast of New England, starring Carl Reiner and Eva Marie Saint
- The Fog (1980), a John Carpenter horror film scripted as a fictional Northern California coastal town, partially inspired by the wrecking of a clipper ship in 1850 prior to the founding of Fort Bragg.
- Racing with the Moon (1984), a drama starring Sean Penn, Elizabeth McGovern, and Nicolas Cage
- Overboard (1987), a romantic comedy starring Goldie Hawn and Kurt Russell
- The Majestic (2001), a romantic period drama starring Jim Carrey

== Notable people ==
- Tom Hawkins, the probable writer of the Wanda Tinasky Letters
- Cammie King, child actress best known for Gone with the Wind, died in Fort Bragg in 2010
- Edward Norris, film actor who made over 70 films. Moved to Fort Bragg in 1997 and died there in 2002.
- Ray Peterson, NFL player
- Gregory E. Pyle, former chief of the Choctaw Nation of Oklahoma. Relocated to Durant, Oklahoma.
- Jim Ross, professional wrestling commentator and former company executive of WWE. Current AEW commentator and executive.
- Cornelius Vander Starr, founder of insurance giant AIG and the Starr Foundation
- Emily Jane White, Neofolk singer

== Sister city ==
As a youth, Ken Sasaki noted that his home, Ōtsuchi, Japan, is located on the same latitude as Fort Bragg and in 2001 he contacted then-Mayor Lindy Peters and visited with a delegation to open discussions on a sister city agreement. Fort Bragg students visited Otsuchi in 2002 and the Sister City Proclamation was solidified in 2005 by Mayor Dave Turner. Other student exchanges were held in 2004, 2006, 2008 and 2010 and the next exchange was planned for July 2011. Following the 2011 Tōhoku earthquake and tsunami devastation of Otsuchi, Mayor Turner ordered that city flags be flown at half staff until the end of March to honor the thousands of lives lost.
