= Emanuel Fritz =

- Born: October 29, 1886; Baltimore, Maryland, United States
- Died: December 15, 1988 (aged 102); Berkeley, California, United States
- Education: Cornell University; Yale University
- Known for: California redwoods
- Children: Roberta Fair; Barbara Fritz
- Awards: Gifford Pinchot Medal, Society of American Foresters (1971)
- Scientific career
- Fields: Forestry
- Workplaces: University of California, Berkeley; U.S. Forest Service; Baltimore Polytechnic Institute

Emanuel Fritz (October 29, 1886 – December 15, 1988) was an American forestry specialist. He worked in the field of California forestry for over 70 years. Upon his death, Fritz was the oldest professor in the history of the University of California. Fritz was known as "Mr. Redwood," in academic and conservation circles.

== Early life and education ==
Emanuel Fritz was born in 1886 in Baltimore, Maryland. He graduated in 1908 with a degree in mechanical engineering from Cornell University. After graduation, he worked at Baltimore Polytechnic University as a professor. In 1912, he left the university to pursue a master's degree in forestry at Yale University, which he earned in 1914.

== Career ==
After graduation from Yale, Fritz worked in forestry in New Hampshire. In 1915, he joined the U.S. Forest Service, where he worked in Montana and Arizona. He served in World War I, earning a rank of captain for his work in aircraft maintenance in France. He became a faculty member at the University of California, Berkeley in 1919.

Fritz led the creation of the University's summer forestry program in Plumas County, California, which remains a keystone component of the forestry program. In the 1930s, he served as editor of the Journal of Forestry. He consulted the State of California about forestry issues. He influenced policy around state regulation of forests. He also served as a consultant for the California Redwood Association and the Save the Redwoods League. He helped create the forestry program at Humboldt State University. He founded the Redwood Region Logging Conference. In 1950, he became Associate Professor at Berkeley.

He retired from Berkeley in 1954.

== Later life and legacy ==
Fritz remained active at the University of California, Berkeley, and in forestry after his retirement. He was a member of the Bohemian Club and used his membership to educate - and influence - members about California forestry. He was also an active member of the Commonwealth Club of California, of which he served on the board of governors. He founded the Regional Parks Association, now known as the East Bay Regional Park District. He died on December 15, 1988, at his home in Berkeley, California.

Fritz's collection of forestry-related photographs are in the collection of the University of California, Berkeley's Marian Koshland Bioscience & Natural Resources Library.
