= XL Ranch =

Indian reservation in Modoc County, California

Coordinates: 41.554404°N 120.452385°W

Location of XL Ranch

The XL Ranch is an Indian reservation located in Modoc County, north of Burney, California.

It is home to the Hewisedawi band of the Pit River Tribe, a federally recognized tribe, which includes 9 bands of Achomawi Indians and 2 bands of Atsugewi Indians.

The XL Ranch is sometimes known as XL Rancheria, XL Ranch Indian Reservation, or X-L Ranch Reservation.

The reservation was established in 1938 and is 9,255 acres (3,745 ha). Approximately 40 tribal members live on the reservation.

== Language ==
The band traditionally spoke the Achumawi and Atsugewi languages, which are closely related. They are part of the Palaihnihan branch of the Hokan language family. Some members of XL Ranch speak the Northern Paiute language, a Western Numic language of the Uto-Aztecan language family.

== Today ==
The Pit River Indian Tribe is headquartered in Burney, California.

Tribal members often find employment in logging and hay ranching.

In 2015, federal agents busted a large marijuana grow. The grow had been started in partnership with a Canadian company, but was disputed between the two direct descendants of the Pit River tribe, siblings Phillip Del Rosa and Wendy Del Rosa.
