= Big Valley =

Big Valley may refer to:

== Places ==
- Big Valley, Alberta, Canada
- Big Valley, a local name for Kishacoquillas Valley in Pennsylvania

=== California ===
- Big Valley (Pit River), an area along part of the Pit River in California
- Big Valley, former name of the Lakeport, California post office in Lake County
- Big Valley, Lassen County, California
  - Big Valley City, a former name of Nubieber, California in Lassen County
  - Big Valley Mountains, in Lassen County, California

== Other uses ==
- The Big Valley, an American western television series
- F/V Big Valley, an Alaskan fishing vessel that sank in 2005
