= Alturas Indian Rancheria =

Indian tribe in California, United States

Alturas Indian Rancheria q̓óssi álláq̓tawí (Achumawi)
- Indian Reservation
- Location of the Alturas Indian Rancheria

The Alturas Indian Rancheria (Achumawi: q̓óssi álláq̓tawí) is a federally recognized tribe of Achomawi Indians in California. The tribe controls a 20-acre (81,000 m^{2}) reservation near Alturas, California, in Modoc County. Tribal enrollment is estimated at 15. The tribe operates the Desert Rose Casino and the Rose Cafe in Alturas. The reservation lies about one mile southeast of downtown Alturas.

== Government ==
The Alturas Indian Rancheria was created as a result of the intensified US Federal Indian Policy of Reorganization known as Termination. According to the National Indian Law Library, the Alturas Indians Rancheria is presently operated under a constitution adopted in 1964 as part of the Pit River Indians. It contains various articles outlining name, territory, membership, governing body, elections, articles and removal, powers of the General Council and Business Committee, Bill of Rights, Amendments and revocation, as well as adoption.

The implementation of this constitution represented the end of the federal governments "trust relationship" with Indian tribes. The new policies made were aimed towards assimilation. Federal benefits and support services were eliminated. Public Law 280 (1953) and Relocation Program (1963) led to the disbanding of their tribal government and decrease in population.

== World view ==
"All things have life in them. Trees have life, rocks have life, mountains, water, all these are full of life. You think a rock is something dead. Not at all. It is full of life. When I came here to visit you, I took care to speak to everything around here.... I sent my smoke to everything. That was to make friends with all things. No doubt there were many things that watched me in the night.... They must have been talking to each others. The stones talk to each other just as we do, and the trees too, the mountains talk to each other. You can hear them sometimes if you pay close attention, especially at night, outside.... I do not forget them. I take care of them, and they take care of me." (Katsumahtauta in Angulo, Achumawi Life-Force 1975:61).

== Language ==
The Achomawi are also known as the Pit River Indians. They traditionally spoke the Achumawi language. However, the language is being lost as new generations of Alturas Indians learn English as their native language.

== Education ==
The ranchería is served by the Modoc Joint Unified School District.

== Traditions and culture ==
Not many of the traditions and ceremonies of the Alturas Indians are known. First-hand accounts state that when boys and girls became adults, they had their ears pierced. In addition to this, boys had to go into the mountains alone overnight while girls were required to dance and sing for 10 nights. Men wore skirt-like materials made from animal hides while women wore shorts and skirts made usually from deer-hide. Men sometimes wore leggings and moccasins of the same materials. When deer-hide was not available, they sometimes used shredded cedar bark. Women got tattoos on their faces while men had their noses pierced to place a shell or bone. Diet resembled that of other Northern California Indians. Their diet was rich in acorns, deer-meat, and salmon.

== See also ==
- Achumawi language
- Achomawi traditional narratives
- List of Indian reservations in the United States
