= Roaring Creek Rancheria =

Coordinates: 40°53′36″N 121°57′12″W

Total population
- 1800 Pit River Indians, 14 living on rancheria

Regions with significant populations
- United States (California)

Languages
- English

Religion
- traditional tribal religion, Christianity

Related ethnic groups
- other Pit River Indians

Location of Roaring Creek Rancheria

The Roaring Creek Rancheria is a federal Indian reservation belonging to Achumawi and Atsugewi members of the Pit River Tribe, a federally recognized tribe of indigenous people of California. The ranchería is located in Shasta County in north-central California.

Established in 1915, Roaring Creek Rancheria is 80 acres (320,000 m^{2}) large and is located 43 miles northeast of Redding, California. More locally, it lies about 5 miles northwest of the unincorporated community of Montgomery Creek.

== Education ==
The ranchería is served by the Mountain Union Elementary School District and the Shasta Union High School District.
