= Madesi tribe =

Native American tribe

Madesi
Regions with significant populations
- United States: 1,500 - Madesi Valley (Big Bend), Pit River, California

Languages
- English and "Pit River Talk"

Related ethnic groups
- Achomawi, Pit River Tribe

The Madesi tribe (pronounced as Mah-day-see; Achumawi: matéési) is an Indigenous group of Native Americans that once thrived in the Big Bend region of the Pit River in northeastern California, United States. This area represents the most downstream section (AKA the Madesi Valley), within the Pit River (Ajumma) in the Pit River Tribal territory. The Madesi tribe is one of nine autonomous bands (also called "tribelets") of the Pit River Tribe who spoke dialects of the Achumawi language, or more commonly, "Pit River Talk." The other two bands of the Pit River Tribe communicate using dialects of a distinct yet related language, called by anthropologists Atsugewi. The historic homeland of the other eight bands that share the Achumawi language extended to Goose Lake. On the south side of the Pit River, the Atsugewi language group consists of two distinct bands (now part of the Pit River Tribe) living in the Hat Creek Valley and Dixie Valley.
