= Montgomery Creek Rancheria =

Coordinates: 40°50′03″N 121°54′56″W

íípʰuníw̓ca' or íípʰuunídial/íípʰuurí (Achumawi)

Total population
- 1800 Pit River Indians, 15 living on rancheria

Regions with significant populations
- United States (California)

Languages
- English

Religion
- traditional tribal religion, Christianity

Related ethnic groups
- other Pit River Indians

Location of Montgomery Creek Rancheria

The Montgomery Creek Rancheria (Achumawi: íípʰuníw̓ca' or íípʰuunídial/íípʰuurí) is a federal Indian reservation belonging to members of the Pit River Tribe, a federally recognized tribe of indigenous people of California. The ranchería is located in Shasta County in northern California.

Established in 1915, Montgomery Creek Rancheria is 109 acres (440,000 m^{2}) large and is located in the unincorporated community of Montgomery Creek, about 35 miles northeast of Redding, California.

== Education ==
The ranchería is served by the Mountain Union Elementary School District and Shasta Union High School District.
