= Pit River Tribe =

Federally recognized American Indian tribe

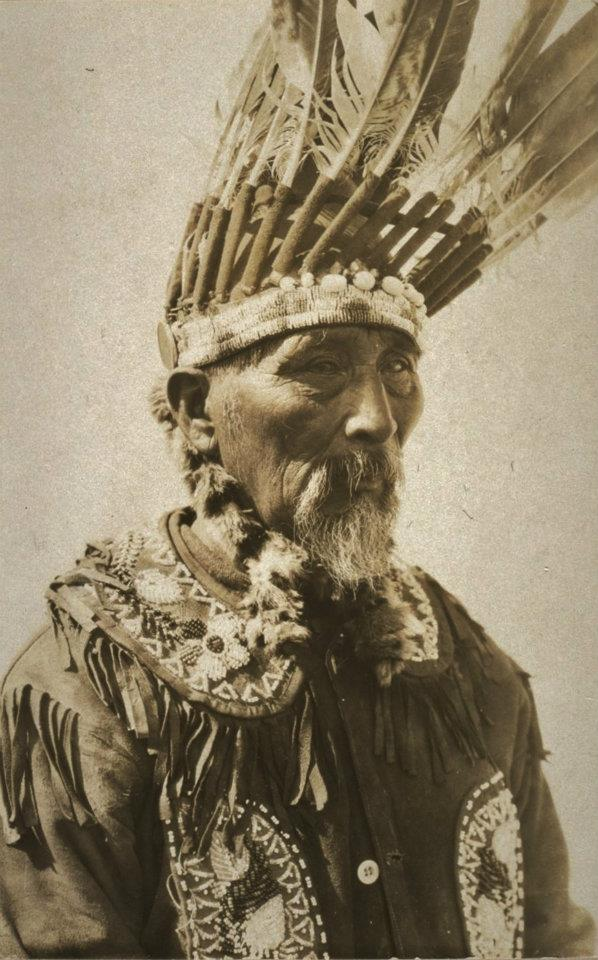
- Istet Woiche, tribal historian of the Madesi tribe, one of the bands of the Pit River Tribe, 1923

Total population
- 1,800

Regions with significant populations
- California, United States

Languages
- English, Achumawi and Atsugewi

Religion
- traditional tribal religion

Related ethnic groups
- Achumawi, Atsugewi, and other Pit River bands

The Pit River Tribe is a federally recognized tribe of eleven bands of Indigenous peoples of California. They primarily live along the Pit River in the northeast corner of California. Their name also is spelled as "Pitt River" in some historical records.

== Bands ==
The eleven bands are as follows:

- Achomawi (acúmmááwi, also Achumawi, Ajumawi)
- Aporidge (also Apwaruge)
- Astariwawi (astaaqííw̓awí, also Astarawi)
- Atsugewi (also Atsuge)
- Atwamsini (atw̓ámsini)
- Hammawi (h̓ámmááw̓i, also Hanhawi)
- Hewisedawi (h̓ééwíssátééwi)
- Ilmawi (ílmááwi)
- Itsatawi (iic̓áátawi)
- Kosalextawi (q̓ússi álléq̓tawí, also Kosalektawi)
- Madesi (matéési)

== Languages ==
The eleven bands of the Pit River Tribe originally spoke two related languages, nine of them speaking Achumawi and two speaking Atsugewi (Atsuge and Apwaruke). They are closely related and are classified as the Palaihnihan family of languages, with uncertain external relations.

Most members of the tribe now speak English. Achumawi is critically endangered, and Atsugewi is extinct.

== Population centers ==
Map of Pit River owned Rancherias and nearby reservations.

The tribe is spread across several locations in Shasta County and Modoc County:

- Big Bend Rancheria, Shasta County, 40 acres, population: 10
- Likely Rancheria, Modoc County, 1.32 acres, tribal cemetery
- Lookout Rancheria, Modoc County, 40 acres, population: 10
- Montgomery Creek Rancheria, Shasta County, 72 acres, population: 15
- Roaring Creek Rancheria, Shasta County, 80 acres, population: 14
- XL Ranch, Modoc County, 9,254.86 acres, population: 40.

The tribe also owns trust lands in Lake County, California, Lassen, Mendocino, Modoc, and Shasta Counties.

== Government ==
The tribe conducts business from Burney, California. They were officially recognized as a tribe in 1976 and ratified their constitution in 1987. Each of the eleven bands is represented in the tribal council.

=== Constitution of the Pit River Tribe and claims ===
In August 1964, a Constitution was formally adopted by the Pit River Tribe. The Preamble states:

"... for the purpose of securing our Rights and Powers inherent in our Sovereign status as reinforced by the laws of the United States, developing and protecting Pit River (Ajumawi - Atsugewi) ancestral lands and all other resources, preserving peace and order in our community, promoting the general welfare of our people and our descendants, protecting the rights of the Tribe and of our members, and preserving our land base, culture and identity, ..."

While the Pit River group originally filed a separate land claims, after the Indian Claims Commission was created in 1946, the Pit River tribe was encouraged in 1963 to participate in the larger claims—Indians of California vs U. S. – but ultimately there was disharmony within the tribe and they rejected their monetary award.

== History ==
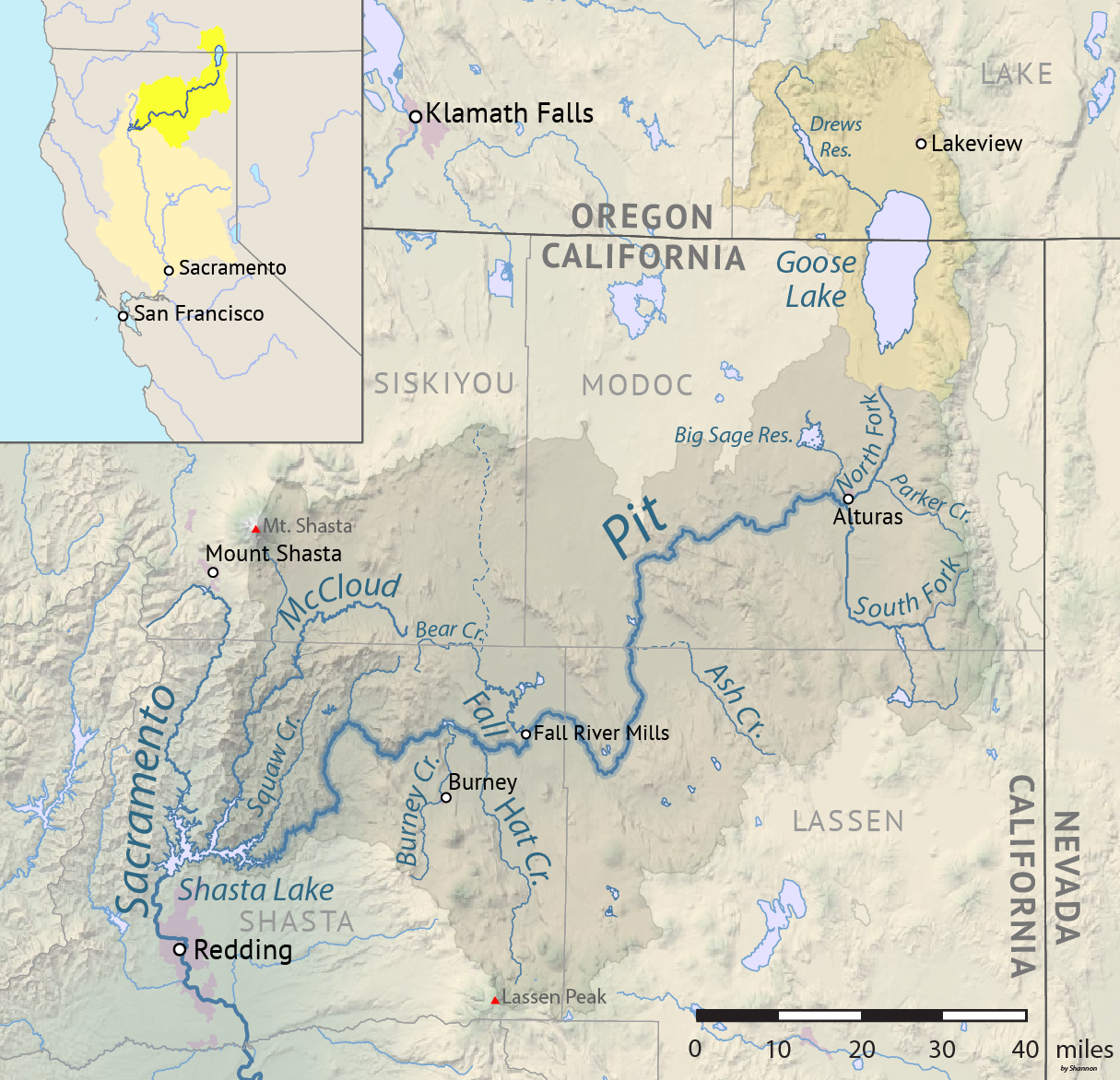
Map of the Pit River course and watershed in northeastern California. The Pit is a tributary of the Sacramento River

=== Pre-19th century ===
Approximately 200 AD: The bow and arrow is introduced into the Pit River area.

Pre-1800 - Pit River bands of indigenous natives were living in abundance for thousands of years. For thousands of years, numerous indigenous villages were situated around and along acúmmá (the Pit River) and out onto the surrounding plains, hills, mountains, and valleys. The people used the natural resources of their land to the fullest. In addition to harvesting deer, salmon, trout, rabbit, birds, and other small mammals, they often moved around their territory and gathered acorns, roots, herbs, and fruits, as each came into their season.

Before the European-American immigration, the Native Americans of the Pit River region were thriving. The eleven bands in the region had similarities and differences in their language and ways. Some downriver bands lived in simple pit houses in small familial villages along acúmmá (the Pit River). They led a somewhat nomadic life, following opportunities to harvest foods from the rich resources of this valley, and ready to move to higher ground when the creeks and rivers flooded in the rainy season. Archaeological evidence and some information collected by ethnographers in the early 1900s gives only minimal details of the thriving culture and communities that existed in the vast Pit River territory.

Pit River artists and craftspeople apparently used both basalt and much obsidian from Glass Mountain to make tools and weapons. Obsidian arrowheads and obsidian flakes from tool-making have been found all over the valley from the river banks to the hillsides and high in mountain hunting camp areas.

=== 19th century ===
1827-1830s - European-American/Canadian fur trappers and explorers began passing through the Pit River area

1830s - Many Pit River natives died from imported disease epidemics.

1848 - California became part of U.S.A. through Treaty of Hidalgo with Mexico (in 1850 California became a state).

1849 - Gold Rush begins, bringing a new huge wave of migrants into California.

1851-53 - U.S. Congress and California Legislature created various laws that deny Indians of land rights and got rid of most aboriginal title in the state, paving the way for continued genocide and land theft, with no treaties or protections for the Pit River Indians.

1850s and 1860s - The movement of emigrants into Pit River territory caused more and more Pit River displacement and changes to the environment. A steady flow of emigrants arrived and continued to occupy Pit River land and began the process of confiscating and fencing off the land.

1850s - European-American immigrant expansion interest and activity in Pit River region began. The US government, military forces, and settlers attacked, displaced, and killed the majority of Pit River Indians, with no treaties or compensation made for land seized.

Regionally (intensifying in the mid-1850s), some more well-known battles, such as the "Wintoon War" and the "Pit River War" took place.

Here is one account of some of those battles: "War was declared on the Indians in 1858. General William Kibbe and Captain I. G. Messec led military and civilian soldiers against the Indians from Trinity County all the way to the Fall River Valley. These soldiers were known as Kibbe's Guards and were ruthless, efficient Indian killers." Many Indians surrendered under the threat of death or starvation, others were captured, untold numbers were killed, and their villages and food supplies were destroyed in the battles.

In 1859, 700 captured Pit River Indians were forcibly taken to the Round Valley Reservation in Mendocino County for internment. The number of soldiers reported killed in the attacks varies; one account mentions 25, while another mentions 90. The main war ended in 1859. Although the vast majority of Pit River Indians had been killed or forcibly moved out of the area, some remained, hidden away, and over 500 of those who were sent away eventually returned to their homeland, only to find settlers taking over more and more property.

By 1868, the US Army under General George Crook took control of many upriver acúmmá areas. Many stories of brutal massacres and killings of Pit River people have been handed down through the oral tradition. The Pit River area was also impacted by economic factors. Government timber land went on sale in 1878, and allowed the purchase of up to 160 acres at $2.50 an acre. Outlying areas were victim to a speculative boom as a result, and large tracts of land passed into private hands. The area was subsequently heavily logged. The over-harvesting of timber in Big Bend region remains an ecological problem today. Most of the once vast and diverse forests in the area have been destroyed by clear-cutting and other industrial logging practices and replaced by tree farms.

The arrival of European-American settlers and the occupation of the Pit River territories disrupted the safety of the Pit River people and their traditional food supply. The Pit River people never signed a treaty with the United States or the State of California; their land was simply illegally confiscated. Many "Pit Rivers" were displaced against their will, and some were murdered for their land. Some returned or resettled nearby when they could, but many were cut off from their extended families and their traditional food sources. Into the 1900s, many Pit River people survived in poverty and some were hired out as ranch hands, mill workers, forestry workers, and other forms of manual labor.

=== 20th century ===
In 1974, the Pitt River tribe claimed almost one million acres of land that was then held by Pacific Gas & Electric Co, Southern Pacific Railroad, the Hearst Corporation, the Los Angeles Times, and four other companies. However, despite the judge presiding over the case agreeing that the Pit River tribe had not received justice and that the loss of land was wrong, rejected the case.

=== 21st century ===
Today, the Pit River people continue to live in what is now called Shasta County, as well as throughout the West. Some continue to hunt and gather in their traditional places, and pray at their sacred sites throughout their homeland. They are a federally recognized tribe (headquarters located in Burney, California) with a tribal council that includes representation of each of the eleven bands making up the Pit River Nation. The tribe operates several "Rancherias" and allotment "satellite" reservations, a casino, a gas station and convenience store, and a large commercial cannabis growing facility which was raided by US and California drug agents in July 2015.

In June 2024, the 1,612-acre Burney Gardens area (652 ha) was transferred to the tribe.

In 2024, the tribe petitioned the U.S. government to protect up to 200 square miles (520 km^{2}) by designation of the Sattitla National Monument, with co-stewardship by the tribe. This includes Medicine Lake Volcano, a very large shield volcano. President Joe Biden designated the Sáttítla Highlands National Monument on January 7, 2025.

In March 2025, President Trump acted to rescind the National Monument designation of the Sáttítla area.

== Ethnobotany ==
They would use Amelanchier to create a sort of body armor. The wood was made into a heavy robe or overcoat and corset armor and used for fighting. Members of the Pit River tribe would also sell Taxus brevifolia to the Yuki people.

The bulbs dug from meadows and acorns from oaks were an important source of food. A ground up form of these plants were stored for winter use.

The Atsugewi have 68 documented uses for various plants.

== Notable members ==
- Jean LaMarr, artist
- Darryl Babe Wilson, writer and storyteller
- Antonio (Tony) Villanueva, Philosopher and Socialite

== See also ==
- Pitt River Expedition
- Shasta people — also indigenous peoples of the Pit River basin.
