= Widow Mountain (California) =

Mountain in California, United States

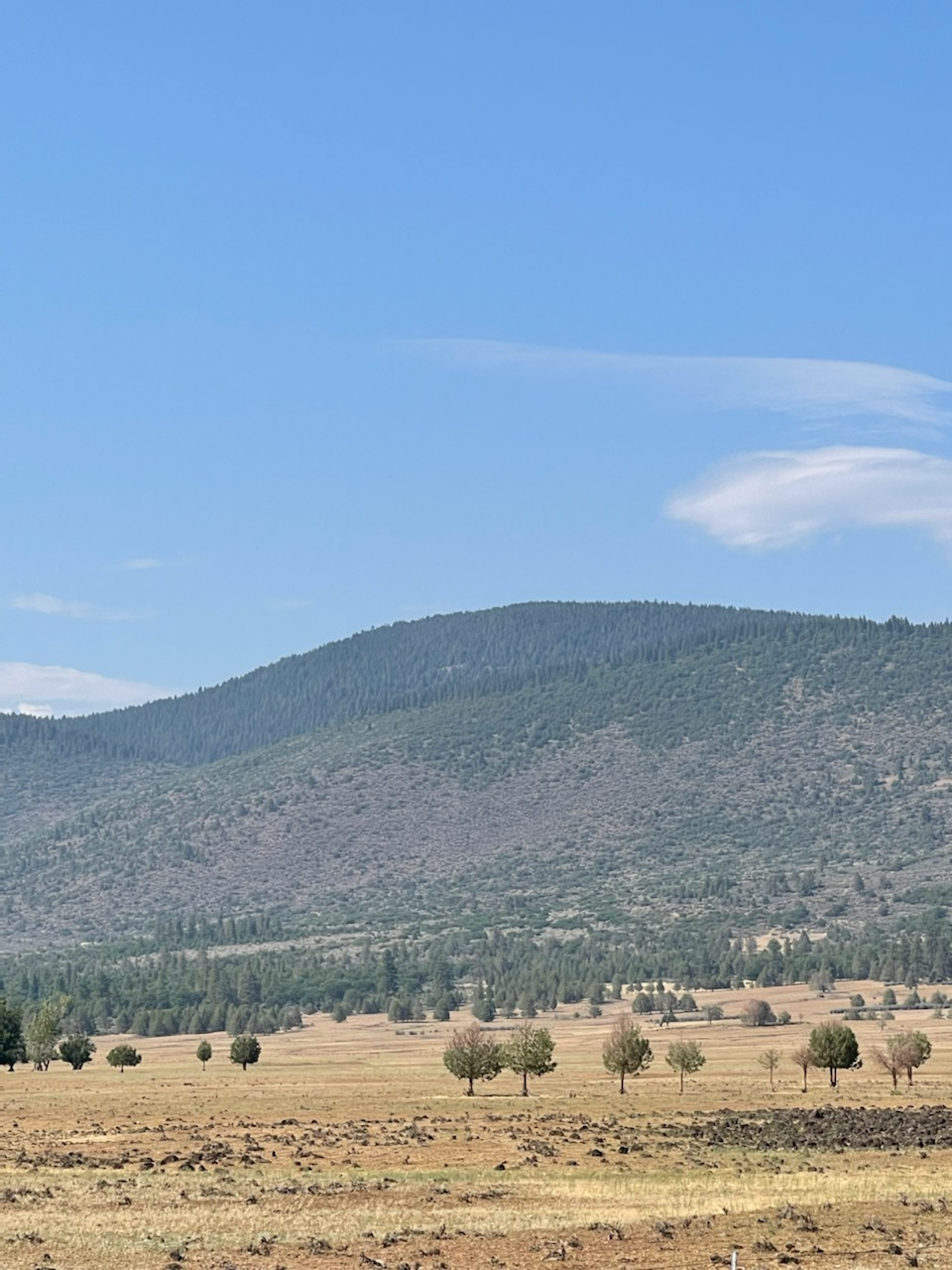
- Widow Mountain in July 2021 as seen from SR 299

Highest point
- Elevation: 1,927 m (6,322 ft)
- Prominence: 586 m (1,923 ft)
- Coordinates: 41°9′34.61″N 121°17′48.92″W

Geography
- Location within California
- Location: Lassen County, California, U.S.
- Parent range: Big Valley Mountains
- Topo map: USGS Day

Widow Mountain is a mountain located in the Big Valley Mountains of northwest Lassen County, California. It is around 8.7 km (5.4 mi) southeast of Day, California.

Standing at 1,927 m (6,322 ft.), it is the highest point in the Big Valley Mountains.

== See also ==
- Big Valley Mountains
