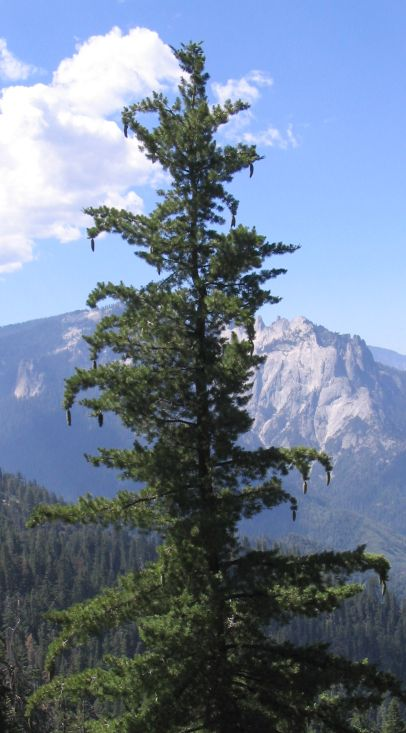

Conservation status
- Least Concern (IUCN 3.1)

Scientific classification
- Kingdom: Plantae
- Clade: Tracheophytes
- Clade: Gymnosperms
- Division: Pinophyta
- Class: Pinopsida
- Order: Pinales
- Family: Pinaceae
- Genus: Pinus
- Subgenus: P. subg. Strobus
- Section: P. sect. Quinquefoliae
- Subsection: P. subsect. Strobus
- Species: P. lambertiana

Binomial name
- Pinus lambertiana Douglas
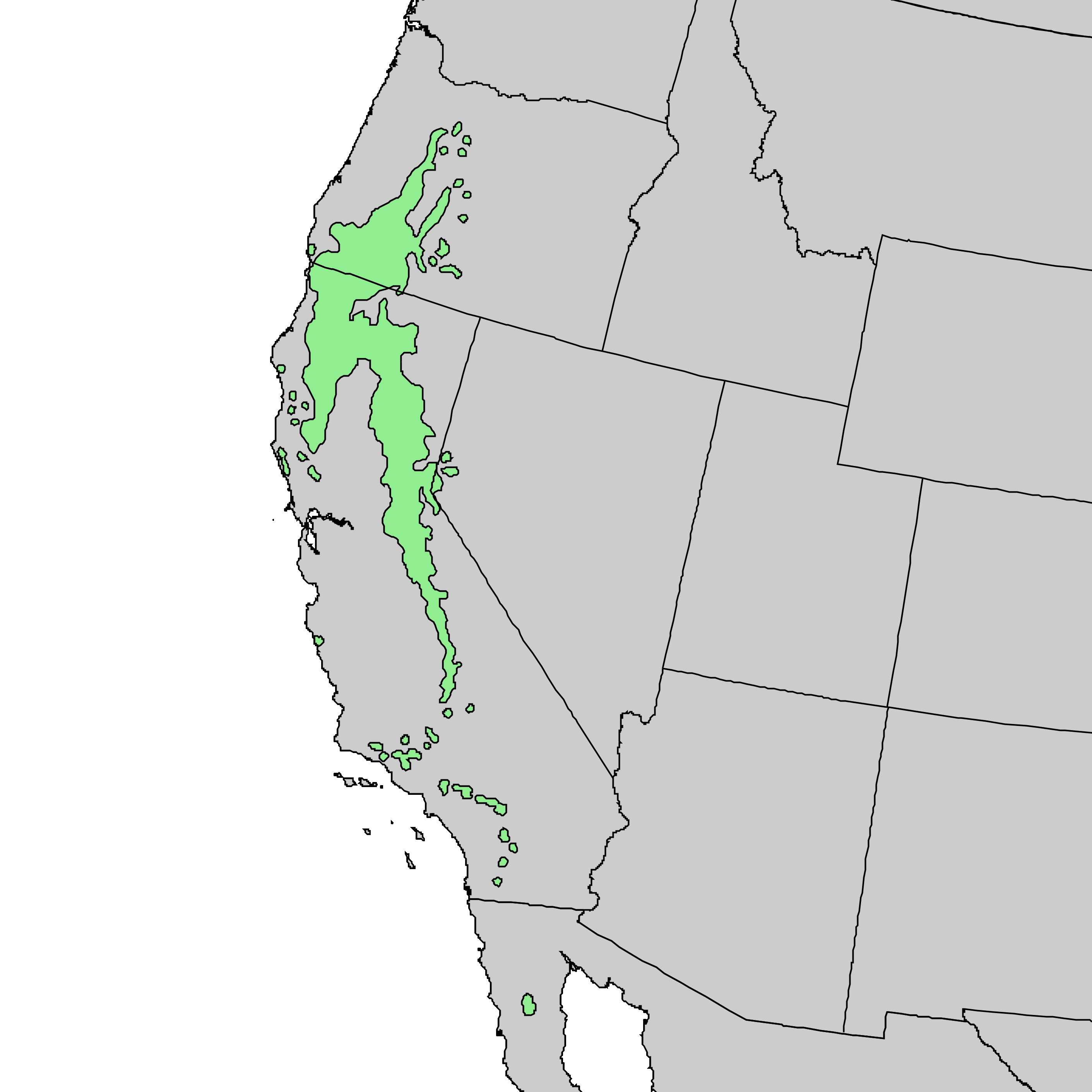
- Natural range of Pinus lambertiana

= Pinus lambertiana =

Sugar pine

Pine tree found in western North America

Pinus lambertiana (commonly known as the sugar pine) is the tallest and most massive pine tree and has among the longest cones of any conifer. It is native to coastal and inland mountain areas along the Pacific coast of North America, as far north as Oregon and as far south as Baja California in Mexico.

== Description ==
=== Growth ===
The sugar pine is the tallest and largest Pinus species, commonly growing to 40–60 meters (130–195 ft) tall, exceptionally to 82 m (269 ft) tall, with a trunk diameter of 1.2–2.5 m (3 ft 11 in – 8 ft 2 in), exceptionally 3.5 m (11 ft 6 in). The tallest recorded specimen is 83.45 m (273 ft 9 in) tall, is located in Yosemite National Park, and was discovered in 2015. The second tallest recorded was "Yosemite Giant", an 82.05 m (269 ft 2 in) tall specimen in Yosemite National Park, which died from a bark beetle attack in 2007. Yosemite National Park also has the third tallest, measured to 80.5 m (264 ft 1 in) tall as of June 2013; the Rim Fire affected this specimen, but it survived. The next tallest known living specimens grow in southern Oregon; one in Umpqua National Forest is 77.7 m (254 ft 11 in) tall and another in Siskiyou National Forest is 77.2 m (253 ft 3 in) tall.

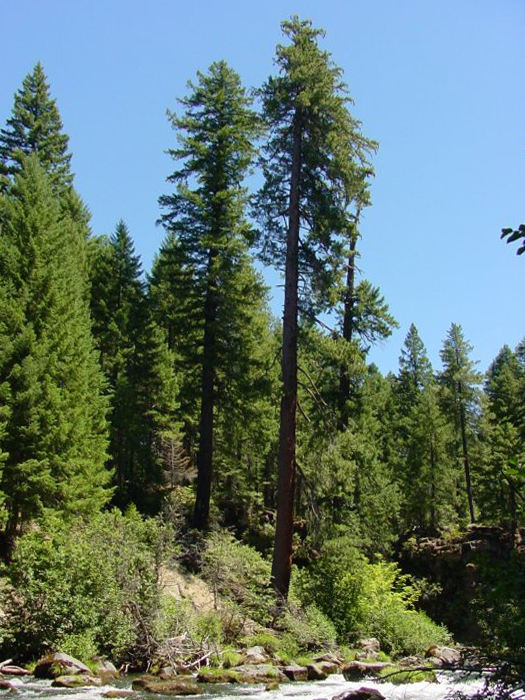
Old sugar pines in the Rogue River – Siskiyou National Forest, southern Oregon

The bark of Pinus lambertiana ranges from brown to purple in color and is 5–10 centimeters (2–4 in) thick. The upper branches can reach out over 8 m (26 ft). Like all members of the white pine group (Pinus subgenus Strobus), the leaves ("needles") grow in fascicles ("bundles") of five with a deciduous sheath. They are 5–11 cm (2–4 1/4 in) long. Sugar pine is notable for having among the longest cones of any conifer, mostly 10–50 cm (4–20 in) long, although they can occasionally reach as much as 56 cm (22 in). Although the cones of the Coulter pine are more massive; the unripe weight of 1–2 kilograms (2.2–4.4 lb) makes the sugar pine's cones perilous projectiles when chewed off by squirrels. The seeds are 1–2 cm (1/2–3/4 in) long, with a 2–3-centimeter (3/4–1 1/4-inch) long wing that aids their dispersal by wind. Sugar pine never grows in pure stands, always in a mixed forest, and is shade tolerant in its youth.

=== Distribution ===
The sugar pine occurs in Oregon and California in the Western United States southward to Baja California, specifically in the Cascade Range, Sierra Nevada, Coast Ranges, and Sierra San Pedro Martir. It is generally more abundant towards the south and can be found between 500 and 1,500 m (1,600 and 4,900 ft) above sea level.

=== Genome ===
The massive 31 gigabase mega-genome of sugar pine has been sequenced in 2016 by the large PineRefSeq consortium. This makes the genome one of the largest sequenced and assembled so far.

The transposable elements that make up the megagenome are linked to the evolutionary change of the sugar pine. The sugar pine contains extended regions of non-coding DNA, most of which is derived from transposable elements. The genome of the sugar pine represents one extreme in all plants, with a stable diploid genome that is expanded by the proliferation of transposable elements, in contrast to the frequent polyploidization events in angiosperms.

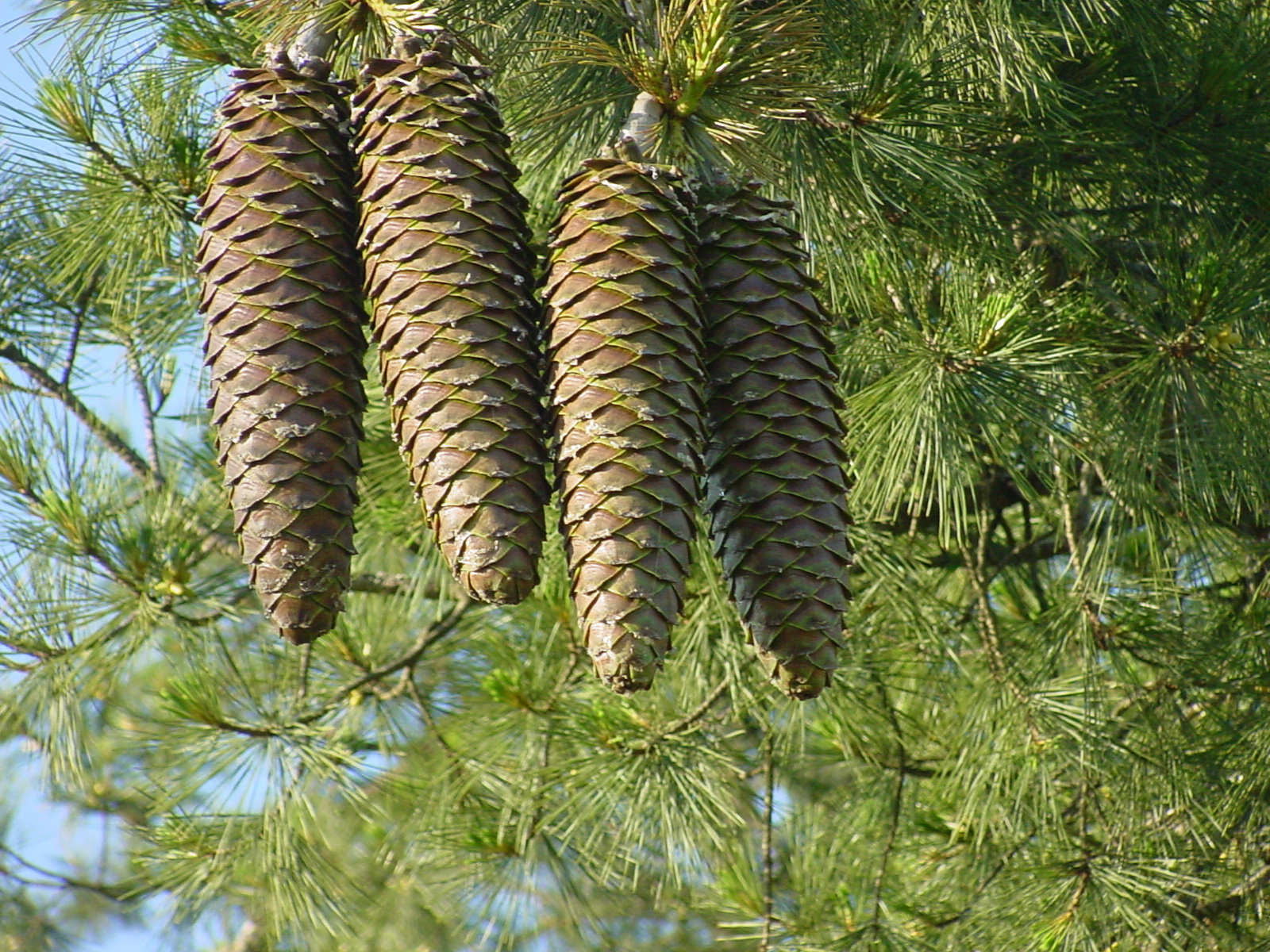
Almost ripe female cones

=== Embryonal growth ===
In late stage of embryonal development, the sugar pine embryo changes from a smooth and narrow paraboloid to a less symmetric structure. This configuration is caused by a transverse orientation of division planes in the upper portion of the embryo axis. The root initial zone is established, and the epicotyl develops as an anlage flanked by regions of that define the cotyledonary buttresses. At this stage, the embryo is composed of the suspensor, root initials and root cap region, hypocotyl-shoot axis, and the epicotyl. The upper (distal) portion of the embryo, which gives rise to the cotyledons and the epicotyl, is considered to be the shoot apex.

=== Shoot apex ===
The shoot apex has the following four zones:

1. The apical initials produce all cells of the shoot apex through cell division. It is located at the top of the meristem and the cells are larger in size compared to other cells on the surface layer.
2. The central mother cell generates the rib meristem and the inner layers of the peripheral tissue zone through cell division. It presents a typical gymnosperm appearance and is characterized by cell expansion and unusual mitosis that occurs in the central region. The rate of mitosis increases on its outer edge.
3. The peripheral tissue zone consists of two layers of cells that are characterized by dense cytoplasm and mitosis of high frequency.
4. Lastly, the rib meristem is a regular arrangement of vertical files of cells which mature into the pith of the axis.

== Etymology ==
Naturalist John Muir considered sugar pine to be the "king of the conifers". The common name comes from the sweet resin, which Native Americans used as a sweetener. John Muir found it preferable to maple sugar. It is also known as the great sugar pine. The scientific name was assigned by David Douglas in 1826, in honor of the London botanist Aylmer Bourke Lambert.

== Ecology ==
=== Wildlife ===
The large size and high nutritional value of the sugar pine seeds are appealing to many species. Yellow pine chipmunks (Neotamias amoenus) and Steller's jays (Cyanocitta stelleri) gather and hoard sugar pine seeds. Chipmunks gather wind-dispersed seeds from the ground and store them in large amounts. Jays collect seeds by pecking the cones with their beaks and catching the seeds as they fall out. Although wind is a main dispersal agent of sugar pine seeds, animals tend to collect and store them before the wind can blow them far.

Black bears (Ursus americanus) feed on sugar pine seeds in the fall months within the Sierra Nevada. Both sugar pine and oak species are currently in decline, directly affecting black bear food sources within the Sierra Nevada.

=== Threats ===
The sugar pine has been severely affected by the white pine blister rust (Cronartium ribicola), a fungal pathogen accidentally introduced from Europe in 1909. A high proportion of sugar pines have been killed by the blister rust, particularly in the northern part of the species' range where blister rust has been present longer. The rust has also destroyed much of the Western white pine and whitebark pine throughout their ranges. The U.S. Forest Service has a program for developing rust-resistant varieties of sugar pine and western white pine. Seedlings of these trees have been introduced into the wild. The Sugar Pine Foundation in the Lake Tahoe Basin has been successful in finding resistant sugar pine seed trees. Blister rust is much less common in California, where sugar, Western white and whitebark pines still survive in great numbers.

Sugar pine trees have been affected by the mountain pine beetle (Dendroctonus ponderosae), which is native to western North America. The beetles lay their eggs inside of the tree and inhibit the tree's ability to defend itself against invading species. Beetle infestation can also cause nutrient deficiencies that slowly weaken the tree's overall health, making pines more susceptible to other threats such as fires and white pine blister rust. Blister rust can weaken the tree and enable further infestation by mountain pine beetles.

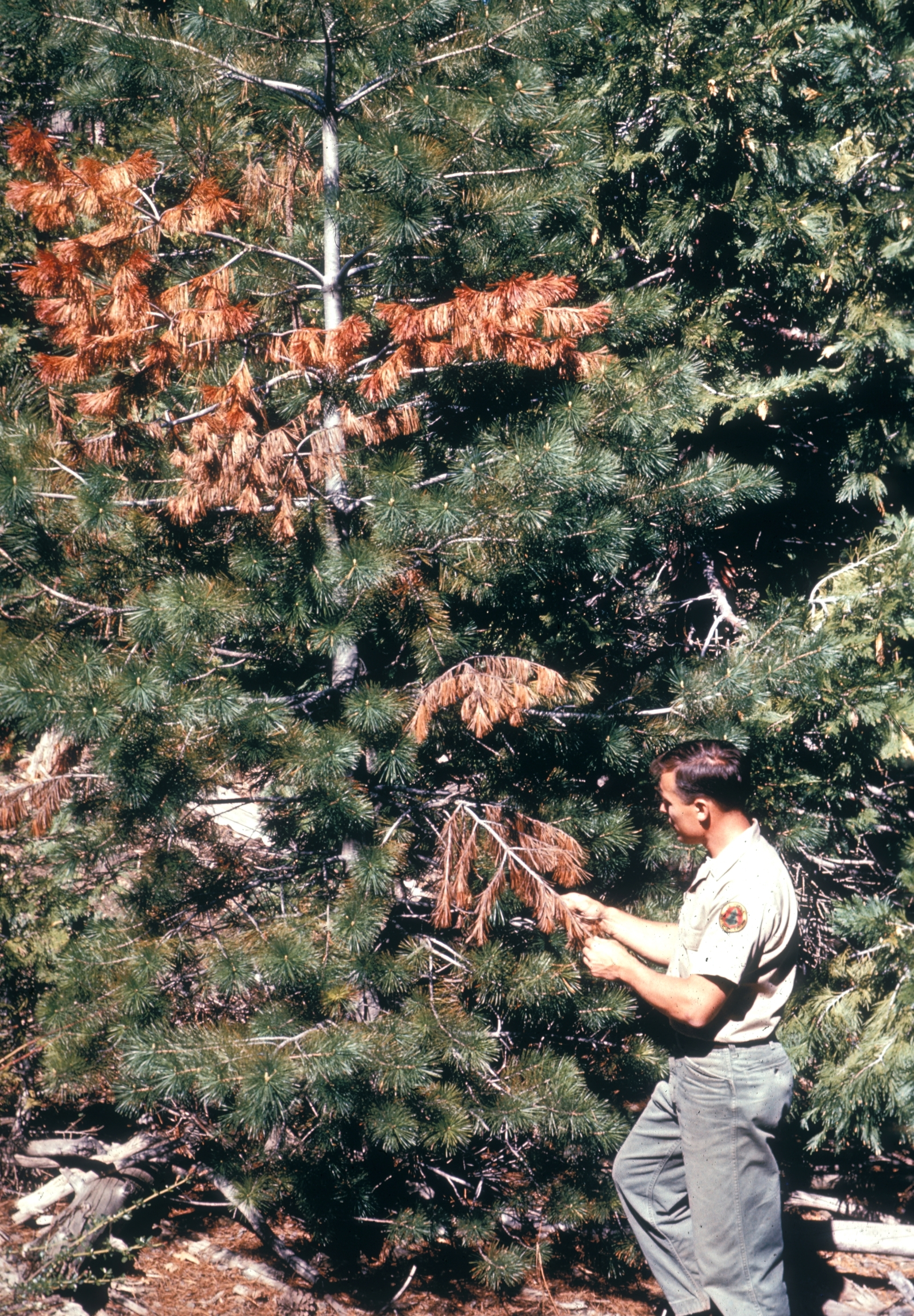
Sugar pine starting to succumb to white pine blister rust

The species is generally resistant to fire because of its thick bark and because it clears away competing species. However, its mortality has been directly linked to drier conditions and higher temperatures. Climate change presents a threat to species health: higher temperatures can decrease resin levels within the trees, weakening defenses against pathogens. At the same time, warmer winters increase survival of pests and pathogens. The weakened or dying trees then provide fuel for forest fires, which may become more frequent and more intense with rising summer temperatures, particularly if coupled with drier conditions and stronger winds.

=== Protective efforts ===
Sugar pine trees are in slow decline due to several threats; white pine blister rust, mountain pine beetles, and climate change. Efforts to restore sugar pines and other white pine trees that have been impacted by invasive species, climate change, and fires have been undertaken by governmental and non-governmental entities. One nonprofit, the Sugar Pine Foundation, was created in 2004 to plant sugar pine seeds in the Sierra Nevada along the border of California and Nevada. They plant seedlings grown from seeds collected from tree strains resistant to blister rust. The foundation's aim is to build in the a wild a sugar pine population that is resistant to white pine rust.

== Uses ==
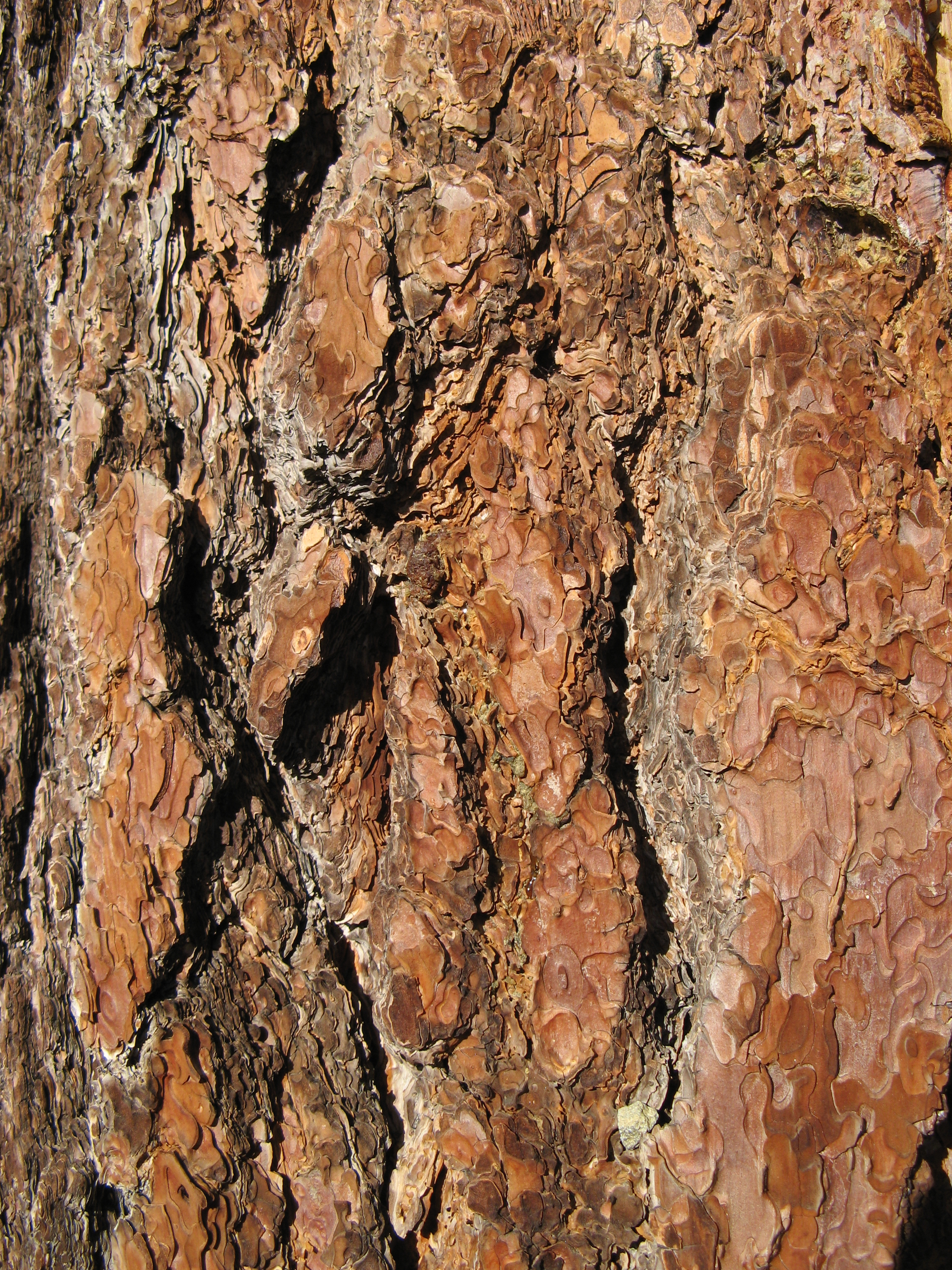
Bark of a sugar pine on Mount San Antonio in the San Gabriel Mountains of Southern California

=== Indigenous uses and traditions ===
Indigenous peoples used several parts of the tree for food. The seeds were eaten raw or roasted, ground into flour, or pulverized into a paste, and the inner bark was also eaten. The sweet resin was consumed in small quantities and could also be chewed as gum. Its sweetness is largely attributed to the pinitol it contains.

Sugar pine also had medicinal and ceremonial uses. Among the Washo, ethnographer Robert H. Lowie recorded the use of a sugar pine preparation after childbirth. Among the Sierra Miwok, eating the first sugar pine nuts of the harvest was preceded by pressing and blowing by a shaman, as with other first fruits. In the Hupa Brush Dance, traditionally performed to cure a sick child, burning sugar pine pitchwood was waved over the child while a particular song was sung, and sugar pine bark was prepared as medicine.

Sugar pine also figures in traditional narratives. In the Achomawi creation myth, Annikadel, the creator, makes one of the 'First People' by intentionally dropping a sugar pine seed in a place where it can grow. One of the descendants in this ancestry is Sugarpine-Cone man, who has a handsome son named Ahsoballache. After Ahsoballache marries the daughter of To'kis the Chipmunk-woman, his grandfather insists that the new couple have a child. To this end, the grandfather breaks open a scale from a sugar pine cone, and secretly instructs Ahsoballache to immerse the scale's contents in spring water, then hide them inside a covered basket. Ahsoballache performs the tasks that night; at the next dawn, he and his wife discover the infant Edechewe near their bed.

In a Wintu narrative recorded by Jeremiah Curtin, a basket of sugar pine seeds is given to the people; although they eat from it, the basket remains full.

=== Timber ===
Sugar pine was commercially logged in the Sierra Nevada during the California Gold Rush, when local sawmills supplied lumber to mining districts and growing foothill communities. The tree was especially valued for its large, straight trunk, which could yield long lengths of clear lumber. Its wood is lightweight, straight-grained, easily worked, and resistant to shrinkage and warping. As supplies of eastern white pine declined in the early 20th century, sugar pine increasingly served as a western substitute. In 1916, the United States Department of Agriculture described it as the most valuable commercial timber tree on the Pacific Coast and estimated that California contained about 39 billion board feet of standing sugar pine.

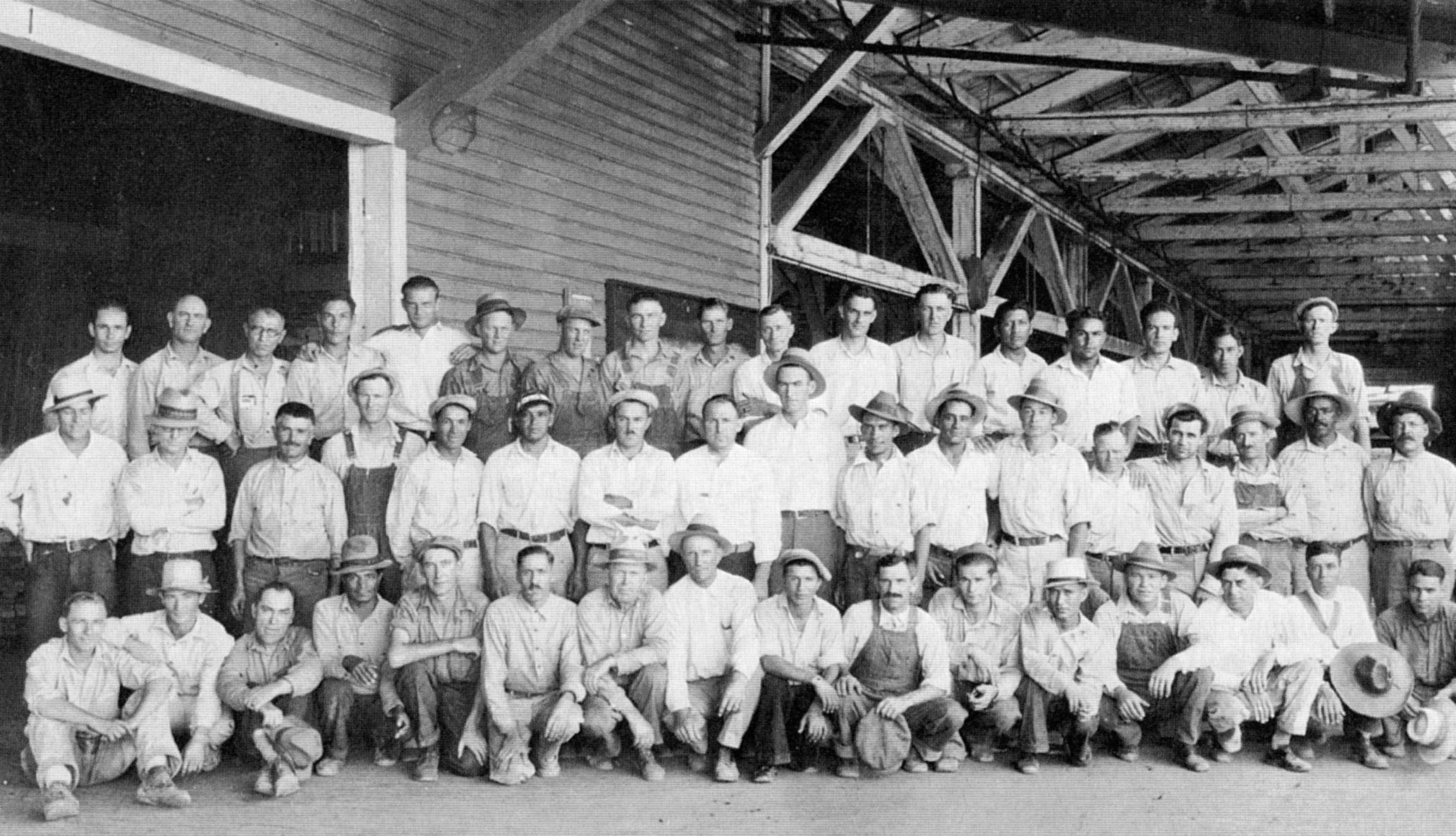
Box-factory and planing-mill workers at the Sugar Pine Lumber Company's Pinedale mill, where sugar pine was processed into finished lumber and wooden boxes, 1925.

Sugar pine lumber was used for building construction, boxes and crates, sash and doors, and millwork. It also became important to California's fruit industry. Lumber cut in the Sierra Nevada was transported to mills and box factories in the San Joaquin Valley, where its light weight and lack of taste or odor made it suitable for raisin trays and fruit boxes. Clear, straight-grained sugar pine was also used for piano keys and organ pipes. The largest pipe of the Wanamaker Organ in Philadelphia, more than 32 feet (9.8 m) long, is made of Oregon sugar pine. In 1902, two carloads of sugar pine from Madera County were shipped to Washington, D.C., for the renovation of the White House under President Theodore Roosevelt.

Completion of the transcontinental railroad in 1869 opened new markets for Sierra Nevada lumber, contributing to the expansion of the sugar-pine industry. Sugar-pine lumber production rose from about 35 million board feet that year to 349 million board feet in 1929. Production fell sharply during the Great Depression, then recovered to a record 370 million board feet in 1941.

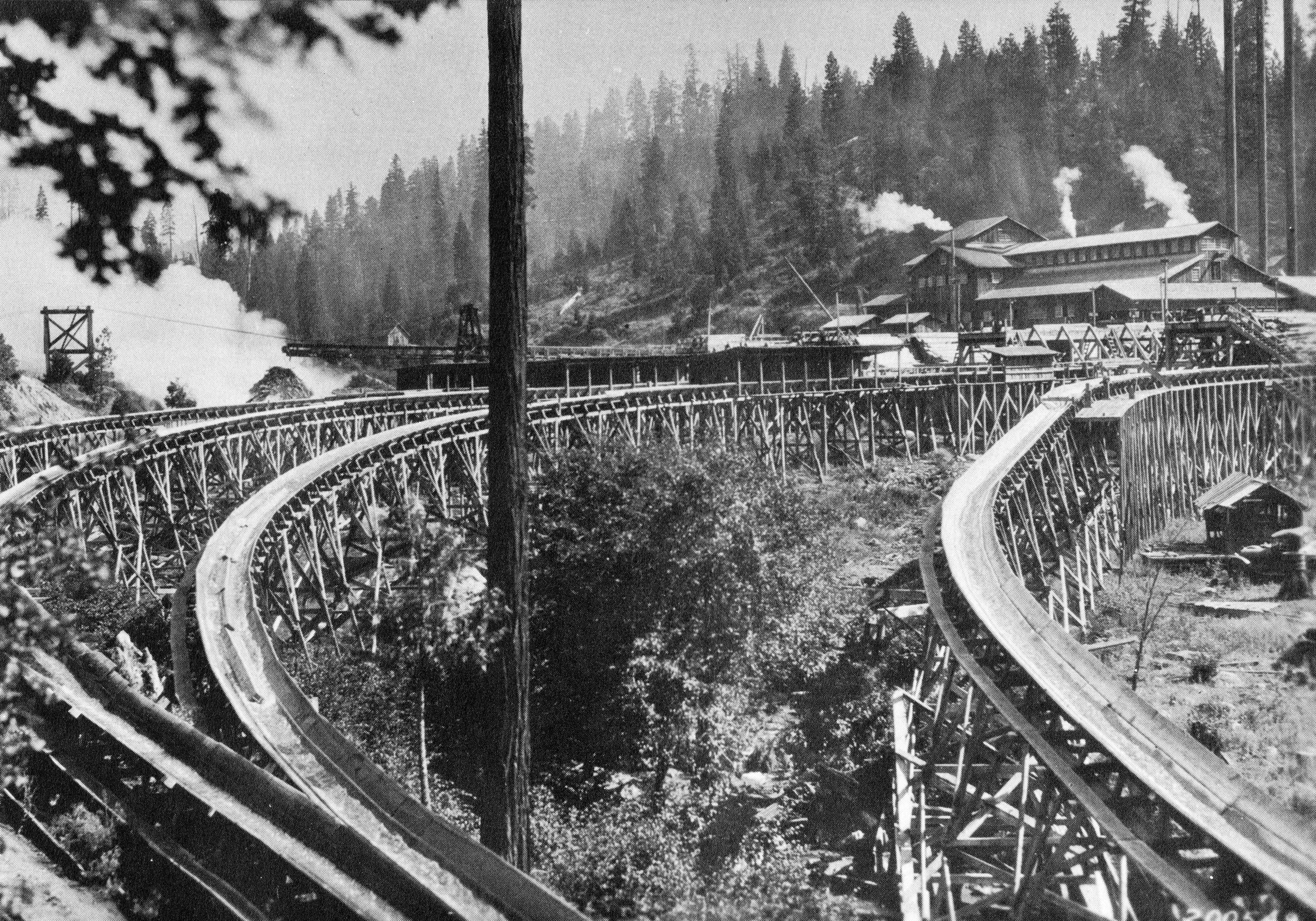
Flume complex at the Madera Sugar Pine Company mill at Sugar Pine, California, c. 1922. The company's flume carried lumber 54 miles (87 km) to Madera.

By the early 20th century, large logging operations had spread into increasingly remote parts of the Sierra Nevada, using logging railroads and flumes to move timber and lumber to mills. The Madera Sugar Pine Company and its predecessors logged forests in Madera and Mariposa counties until the company's own timber supply was largely exhausted by the mid-1920s, after production over the life of the operation approached 1.5 billion board feet. Logging also reached privately owned timberlands within Yosemite National Park. During the 1920s and 1930s, conservation efforts brought large tracts of sugar-pine forest under federal ownership and protected them from further logging.

Sugar pine remained an important commercial timber after World War II, but large, high-quality trees had become increasingly scarce after decades of selective logging. As mills began using smaller trees and a wider range of species, white fir, Douglas-fir, and other conifers made up a larger share of California's lumber production. Before 1942, sugar and ponderosa pine together accounted for more than 80 percent of the lumber cut by the state's pine industry; by 1956 their share had fallen to 52 percent.

Commercial harvesting continued at lower volumes in the 2010s. California harvested 112.9 million board feet of sugar pine in 2016, accounting for 7.2 percent of the state's timber harvest.
