= Big Bend Rancheria =

Settlement of the Pit River Tribe

Coordinates: 41°01′35″N 121°55′08″W

Location of Big Bend Rancheria

The Big Bend Rancheria (Achumawi: matéési) is a settlement of the Pit River Tribe (Achomawi) north of Big Bend, in Shasta County, California. It is about 50 miles (80 km) northeast of Redding. This area lies in the traditional land of the Madesi Tribe.

== Education ==
The rancheria was served by the Indian Springs Elementary School District until the school closed sometime before July of 2022. It is still served by Shasta Union High School District.

== See also ==
- List of Indian reservations in the United States
