= Susanville Indian Rancheria =

Coordinates: 40°25′49.86″N 120°39′27.23″W

Pam Sewim K'odom (Northeast Maidu)

Total population
- 698

Regions with significant populations
- United States ( California)

Languages
- English, Mountain Maidu, Northern Paiute language

Religion
- traditional tribal religion, Christianity

Related ethnic groups
- Achomawi, Atsugewi, Mountain Maidu, Northern Paiute and Washoe people

The Susanville Indian Rancheria (Northeast Maidu: Pam Sewim K'odom, bush creek country) is a federally recognized ranchería of Native Americans in northeastern California whose people are from the Washoe, Achomawi, Mountain Maidu, Northern Paiute, and Atsugewi tribes.

== Reservation ==
Location of Susanville Indian Rancheria

Founded in 1923, the Susanville Rancheria, located in Lassen County, California, comprised 150 acres (0.61 km^{2}) in 2000. In 1923 the Lower Rancheria was 30 acres (120,000 m^{2}). The Rancheria acquired the Susanville Cemetery, 0.53 acres (2,100 m^{2}), in 1975. The Upper Rancheria included 120 acres (0.49 km^{2}) acquired in 1978 and 875 acquired in 2002, totaling 995 acres (4.03 km^{2}). In Herlong the tribe acquired 72 acres (290,000 m^{2}) in 2000 and has 50 acres (200,000 m^{2}) pending. 80 acres (320,000 m^{2}) in Ravendale were given to the tribe. The tribe purchased 160 acres (0.65 km^{2}) in Cradle Valley in 2003. The landbase of Susanville Rancheria in 2010 totals 1,337.53 acres (5.4128 km^{2}).

In 2016 under the bi-partisan "Susanville Indian Rancheria Lands Bill," co-sponsored by Senators Barbara Boxer and Dianne Feinstein, and Rep. Doug LaMalfa, the federal government transferred 300 acres of traditional tribal lands from the Bureau of Land Management to the Rancheria, with the Department of Interior taking it into trust on their behalf. This will "enable the tribes to preserve vital cultural and natural resources."

Tribal Chairman Brandon Gutierez said that the return of this land would enable the tribe "to preserve ancestral lands" and "vitally important cultural artifacts, including the remains of a historic Native camp, ancient petroglyphs, traditional medicinal plants." Control of this land is also important for ecology, as it "serves as a migratory path for antelope and mule deer."

Jean LaMarr is a member of the Susanville Indian Rancheria.

== Government ==
Susanville Indian Rancheria is governed by a democratically elected, seven-member council. They are headquartered in Susanville, California, and their current administration is as follows:

- Tribal Chairman: Arian Hart
- Vice-chairman: Robert Joseph
- Secretary/Treasurer: Christi Choo
- District 1 Councilman: Aaron Brazzanovich Jr.
- District 2 Councilman: Alton Brazzanovich
- At-Large Representative (On-Trust Land): Kurt Merino
- At-Large Representative (Lassen County): Mary Joseph

== Economic development ==
The Susanville Indian Rancheria initiated plans in 2009 to begin an ambitious plan to diversify the Tribe's businesses, while creating new business(s) to support infrastructure while giving Tribal members and the community additional sources of revenue and jobs.

They named their newly formed business division, SIRCO - Susanville Indian Rancheria Corporation. This corporation was chartered under the corporate charter of the Susanville Indian Rancheria. http://www.sircorporation.com. SIRCO is now a Federally Chartered Section 17 corporation. SIRCO operates all the businesses of the Susanville Indian Rancheria. This entity is separate from the government side of the tribe and has its own distinct Board of Directors.

SIRCO operates Diamond Mountain Casino, the 24 Hour Cafe, Lava Rock Grill, and the Diamond Mountain Casino Hotel, all located in Susanville. In January 2011 the Diamond Mountain Smoke Shop opened.

SIRCO has created companies that are developing business opportunities in the Federal contracting arena. The first company, Four Tribes Construction Services, located in Gaithersburg, Maryland, is a certified SBA 8(a) company, having received its certification in November 2011. The second SBA 8(a) company, SFS Global, LLC, obtained its 8(a) certification on November 8, 2012. The third company, SIRCOMED, involved in medical staffing, obtained its 8(a) certification on March 15, 2013. Other companies are in the pipeline to take advantage of the benefits afforded Native American tribes in contracting with the federal government.

The Susanville Indian Rancheria Corporation (SIRCO) manages 120 housing units in Herlong, California for the Rancheria. Current occupancy rate is over 94%.

== History ==
In 1923, the federal government purchased 30 acres (120,000 m^{2}) of the reservation for the local landless Indians. They ratified their constitution and bylaws on March 3, 1969, gaining federal recognition under the Indian Reorganization Act of 1934.

== Education ==
The ranchería is served by the Susanville Elementary School District and Lassen Union High School District.

== Notable tribal members ==
- Jean LaMarr, artist and activist
