= Likely Rancheria =

Coordinates: 41°12′17″N 120°28′44″W

h̓ámmááw̓i (Achumawi)

Total population
- 1800 Pit River Indians, 0 living on rancheria

Regions with significant populations
- United States (California)

Languages
- English

Religion
- traditional tribal religion, Christianity

Related ethnic groups
- other Pit River Indians

Location of Likely Rancheria

The Likely Rancheria (Achumawi: h̓ámmááw̓i) is a federal Indian reservation belonging to the Pit River Tribe, a federally recognized tribe of indigenous people of California. The ranchería is located in Modoc County in northern California.

Likely Rancheria is 1.32 acres (5,300 m^{2}). It was purchased by the Pit River Tribe in 1922 and serves as their tribal cemetery. It is the smallest Indian reservation in the United States. It is located about two miles (3.2 km) southeast of the community of Likely, in Modoc County.

== Education ==
The ranchería is served by the Modoc Joint Unified School District.
