= Edechewe =

Edechewe (Fisher, or the Fisher-Man) is a folk hero of the Madesi, a Native American tribe of the Pit River region, located in what is now Northern California. Edechewe was born supernaturally from the cone of a sugar pine as the result of a magical rite performed by his father, Ahsoballache. His parents nurture him through infancy, after which his grandmother, To'kis, raises him.

In toddlerhood, Edechewe begins to exhibit extraordinary hunting skills. He grows into an attractive, kindhearted young man.

Under the guidance of the superbeing Annikadel, he completes a mission to propel the Sun and Moon) into the sky—and also their followers, the North Star and the South Star.

== Edechewe's brothers ==
Edechewe has an older brother, Bluejay, and a younger brother, Weasel. One story finds Edechewe and Weasel living together. Weasel is gathering wood by himself one day when he is kidnapped by Lizard. Edechewe sends messengers to ask the Sun about Weasel's disappearance. The Sun tells the messengers about a boy she saw who might be Weasel.

Acting on this lead, Edechewe travels to Lizard's house the next day. Edechewe rescues Weasel while Lizard is out. The two brothers burn down Lizard's house and then flee. After a long chase, Lizard overtakes them. Lizard nearly bests the fatigued Edechewe in a fight, but Bluejay happens to be nearby stalking deer. Bluejay hits Lizard in the belly, splitting him in two and killing him. The three brothers return to Weasel and Edechewe's home together.

== See also ==
- Achomawi
- Traditional narratives (Native California)
