= Big Bend, California =

Big Bend matéési (Achumawi) Madesi Valley
- unincorporated area census-designated place
- Location in Shasta County and the state of California
- Coordinates: 41°1′11″N 121°54′28″W
- Country: United States
- State: California

Area
  - Total: 5.82 sq mi (15.08 km^{2})
  - Land: 5.73 sq mi (14.85 km^{2})
  - Water: 0.089 sq mi (0.23 km^{2}) 1.53%
- Elevation: 1,686 ft (514 m)

Population (2020)
  - Total: 79
  - Density: 13.8/sq mi (5.32/km^{2})
- Time zone: UTC-8 (Pacific (PST))
  - Summer (DST): UTC-7 (PDT)
- ZIP code: 96011
- Area code: 530
- FIPS code: 06-06475
- GNIS feature ID: 0256886

Big Bend (Achumawi: matéési) of the Madesi Valley is the indigenous homeland of the Madesi tribe, located in Shasta County, northeastern California, United States. It is named for a major change in course of the Pit River.

Its population is 79 as of the 2020 census, down from 102 from the 2010 census. For statistical purposes, the United States Census Bureau has defined Big Bend as a census-designated place (CDP).

== History ==
=== Native Americans ===
For several thousand years prior to the 19th century, Big Bend was the heart of the territory of the Madesi tribe (pronounced Mah-day-see) tribe (or "band") of Pit River Native Americans. The Madesi is one of nine bands (also called "tribelets") that spoke the Achomawi language. (Early anthropologists mistakenly called all nine bands in the language group "Achomawi," although only one of the bands was actually called Achomawi.)

The Madesi band's territorial region included Big Bend and the surrounding area of the Lower Pit River (ajúmmá in the Madesi dialect, which has few or no speakers still living), and several of its tributaries, such as Kosk Creek (An-noo-che'che) and Nelson Creek (Ah-lis'choo'-chah). The main village of the Madesi was on the north bank of the Pit River, east of Kosk Creek, and was called matéési, or matéési atw̓am (Madesi Valley), and was directly across the river from the smaller villages that surrounded the hot springs on the river's south bank, which were called Oo-le'-moo-me, Lah'-lah-pis'-mah, and Al-loo-satch-ha.

The Madesi people enjoyed great abundance of food sources, which mainly consisted of acorns, deer, salmon, and other fish from the river.

=== Euro-American settlers ===
The Big Bend area is so remote and isolated that the Madesi was one of the last indigenous peoples of California to be invaded and pushed out of their ancestral homeland.

As white settlers began to come to Big Bend in the 1860s, few Madesi were left in the area, and the newcomers began to claim the conquered land as their own. By the 1890s, Big Bend was becoming a small quiet town of white settlers, centered around the hot springs. It was originally called Elena (1890) by the Euro-Americans settlers, and then changed to Henderson, (1906) before they began calling it "Big Bend" (1922).

Early white settlers built a log hotel with a post office and a saloon just above the main hot springs. Many visitors around the turn of the 20th-century came to Big Bend to soak in the hot springs, seeking the reputed healing qualities of the hot mineral water baths.

Big Bend grew slowly until the late 1930s, when Pacific Gas and Electric Company began construction on the Pit Five Hydroelectric Dam and Pit Five Power House. The dam construction brought thousands of jobs and people to Big Bend. This included engineers, builders, tunnel diggers (around 2000 hard-rock miners), and service workers to the area. Big Bend saw a "boom and bust" cycle, and the population was declining by the late 1940s, after the dam work was completed. Although the maintenance of the hydroelectric facilities and a large commercial logging industry still require numerous employees, almost all of the people working in such jobs live outside of Big Bend, contributing further to the population decline.

The population of Big Bend was only 102 people in the 2010 census, apparently the lowest number of residents since the 1860s.

== Geography ==
Big Bend is located at 41°1′11″N 121°54′28″W (41.019803, -121.907881).

The community is situated on a long bend in the Pit River which is the longest tributary to the Sacramento River. The Pit River (traditionally called Achoma) is one of only three rivers that crosses the Cascades mountain range and drains into the Pacific Ocean. Before the dams were built, the Pit River hosted the third largest Salmon run on the west coast of the US. From Big Bend is a striking view of Chalk Mountain (called Too-le-pah-ah-te Ah-ko by the Madesi tribe) which has a natural exposed slide feature of diatomaceous earth. The slide is locally called the "White Buffalo," since it resembles a white bison. Another prominent mountain hovering over the town of Big Bend is called Bald Peak (called Ma-how-mah-day Ah-ko by the Madesi tribe), which has dozens of cold water springs, creating numerous creeks that feed into the Pit River, a spring-fed, or a "free stone" river.

According to the United States Census Bureau, the CDP has a total area of 5.8 square miles (15 km^{2}), of which 98.47% is land and 1.53% is water.

== Demographics ==
Historical population
Census	Pop.	Note	%±
2000	149		—
2010	102		−31.5%
2020	79		−22.5%
U.S. Decennial Census; 1850–1870 1880-1890; 1900 1910 1920; 1930 1940 1950; 1960 1970 1980; 1990 2000 2010

=== 2020 census ===
As of the 2020 census, Big Bend had a population of 79. The population density was 13.8 inhabitants per square mile (5.3/km^{2}). The median age was 52.8 years. 13.9% of residents were under the age of 18 and 25.3% of residents were 65 years of age or older. For every 100 females there were 102.6 males, and for every 100 females age 18 and over there were 94.3 males age 18 and over. 0.0% of residents lived in urban areas, while 100.0% lived in rural areas.

The age distribution was 11 people (13.9%) under the age of 18, 5 people (6.3%) aged 18 to 24, 14 people (17.7%) aged 25 to 44, 29 people (36.7%) aged 45 to 64, and 20 people (25.3%) who were 65 years of age or older. There were 40 males and 39 females.

The whole population lived in households. There were 43 households, out of which 18.6% had children under the age of 18 living in them. Of all households, 39.5% were married-couple households, 14.0% were cohabiting couple households, 23.3% had a male householder with no spouse or partner present, and 23.3% had a female householder with no spouse or partner present. About 14.0% of all households were made up of individuals, and 7.0% had someone living alone who was 65 years of age or older. The average household size was 1.84. There were 29 families (67.4% of all households).

There were 67 housing units at an average density of 11.7 units per square mile (4.5 units/km^{2}), of which 43 (64.2%) were occupied and 35.8% were vacant. Of the occupied units, 39 (90.7%) were owner-occupied and 4 (9.3%) were renter-occupied. The homeowner vacancy rate was 0.0% and the rental vacancy rate was 0.0%.

Racial composition as of the 2020 census
Race	Number	Percent
White	56	70.9%
Black or African American	0	0.0%
American Indian and Alaska Native	10	12.7%
Asian	0	0.0%
Native Hawaiian and Other Pacific Islander	0	0.0%
Some other race	2	2.5%
Two or more races	11	13.9%
Hispanic or Latino (of any race)	5	6.3%

== Politics ==
In the state legislature Big Bend is located in the 1st senatorial district, represented by Republican Megan Dahle, and the 1st Assembly district, represented by Republican Heather Hadwick.

Federally, Big Bend is in California's 1st congressional district, represented by Republican James Gallagher.

== Natural attractions ==
=== Hot springs ===
Big Bend is known in the Northern California region for its geothermal hot springs. There are several hot spring sources on the Big Bend Hot Springs property along the Pit River. Privately owned land containing hot springs is expected to open for public tourism.

=== Pit River ===
The Pit River is a "free stone river" and provides excellent fishing for McCloud River redband trout.

The Pit River has had occasional white water level releases from the dams to provide white water rafting with Class 4 and Class 5 rapids.

A highly scenic gravel road follows the Pit River upstream from Big Bend to Highway 89 near McArthur-Burney Falls Memorial State Park.

=== Iron Canyon Reservoir ===
Iron Canyon Reservoir, located near Big Bend, impounds water diverted from the McCloud River and contains Rainbow Trout and Brown Trout. This reservoir provides an opportunity for canoeing and float tubing. The reservoir is in the Shasta-Trinity National Forest and has two campgrounds, one administered by the US Forest Service and one by Pacific Gas and Electric Company.
