= Lookout Rancheria =

Coordinates: 41°12′50″N 121°05′36″W

úúláq̓ta (Achumawi)

Total population
- 1800 Pit River Indians, 10 living on rancheria

Regions with significant populations
- United States (California)

Languages
- English

Religion
- traditional tribal religion, Christianity

Related ethnic groups
- other Pit River Indians

Location of Lookout Rancheria

The Lookout Rancheria (Achumawi: úúláq̓ta) is a federal Indian reservation belonging to the Pit River Tribe, a federally recognized tribe of indigenous people of California. The ranchería is located in Modoc County in northern California.

Lookout Rancheria is 40 acres (160,000 m^{2}) large and was established in 1913. The rancheria is adjacent to the Shasta National Forest and located about halfway between Burney and Alturas in northeastern California. It is located about four miles (6 km) east of the small community of Lookout in southwestern Modoc County.

== Education ==
The ranchería is served by the Big Valley Joint Unified School District.

== See also ==
- Lookout, California
