= Big Valley Mountains =

Mountain range in northeast California

- Location within California

Highest point
- Peak: Widow Mountain
- Elevation: 1,927 m (6,322 ft)
- Coordinates: 41°09′34″N 121°17′50″W

Geography
- Country: United States
- State: California
- Counties: Lassen, Modoc and Siskiyou
- Range coordinates: 41°09′35″N 121°17′49″W
- Topo map: USGS Day

The Big Valley Mountains are a mountain range that span northwest Lassen County, southwest Modoc County, and southeast Siskiyou County. The tallest peak in this range is Widow Mountain, which stands at 1,927 m (6,322 ft) in Lassen County. The range is host to many springs that feed local creeks and reservoirs.

The communities of White Horse, Day, Lookout Junction, and Nubieber are located at or near the edges of this range.
