= Atsugewi traditional narratives =

Mythology preserved by the Atsugewi people

Atsugewi traditional narratives include myths, legends, tales, and oral histories preserved by the Atsugewi people of the Pit River basin of Northeastern California.

Atsugewi oral literature reflects the transitional position of Atsugewi culture between Central California, Northwest Coast, Plateau, and Great Basin regions.

== See also ==
Traditional narratives (Native California).)

== On-Line Examples of Atsugewi Narratives ==
- "Achomawi and Atsugewi Tales" by Roland B. Dixon (1908)

== Sources for Atsugewi Narratives ==
- Dixon, Roland B. 1908. "Achomawi and Atsugewi Tales". Journal of American Folklore 21:159-177.(Two myths collected in 1900 and 1903.)
- Luthin, Herbert W. 2002. Surviving through the Days: A California Indian Reader. University of California Press, Berkeley. (Two narratives recorded in 1996 and 1931, pp. 59–61, 139–151.)
- Swann, Brian. 1994. Coming to Light: Contemporary Translations of the Native Literatures of North America. Random House, New York. ("Silver-Gray Fox Creates Another World," recorded by Susan Brandenstein in the early 1930s, pp. 737–748.)
- Walters, Diane. 1977. "Coyote and Moon Woman (Apwarukeyi)". In Northern Californian Texts, edited by Victor Golla and Shirley Silver, pp. 147–157. International Journal of American Linguistics Native American Texts Series No. 2(2). University of Chicago Press.
