= Atsugewi language =

Extinct Palaihnihan language

Atsugewi
- Atsugé
- Native to: United States
- Region: California
- Ethnicity: Atsugewi people
- Extinct: 1988, with the death of Medie Webster
- Language family: Hokan ?: Shasta–Palaihnihan; Palaihnihan; Atsugewi

Language codes
- ISO 639-3: atw
- Glottolog: atsu1245
- ELP: Atsugewi
- Atsugewi is classified as Extinct by the UNESCO Atlas of the World's Languages in Danger

Atsugewi is a recently extinct Palaihnihan language of northeastern California spoken by the Atsugewi people of Hat Creek and Dixie Valley. In 1962, there were four fluent speakers out of an ethnic group of 200, all elderly, and the last of them died in 1988. The last fluent native speaker was Medie Webster; as of 1988, other tribal members knew some expressions in the language. For a summary of the documentation of Atsugewi see Golla (2011: 98–99).

Atsugewi is related to Achumawi. They have long been considered as part of the hypothetical Hokan stock, and it has been supposed that within that stock they comprise the Palaihnihan family.

The name properly is Atsugé, to which the -wi of the Achumawi or Pit River language was erroneously suffixed.

== History ==
Estimates for the pre-contact populations of most native groups in California have varied substantially. Alfred L. Kroeber estimated the combined 1770 population of the Achumawi and Atsugewi as 3,000. A more detailed analysis by Fred B. Kniffen arrived at the same figure. T. R. Garth (1978:237) estimated the Atsugewi population at a maximum of 850.

Kroeber estimated the combined population of the Achumawi and Atsugewi in 1910 as 1,100. The population was given as about 500 in 1936.

== Sounds ==
=== Consonants ===
Atsugewi has 32 consonants. Most of these form pairs of plain and glottalized. Plosives and affricates also have a third, aspirated member of the series (except for the single glottal stop).

| | | Bilabial | Alveolar | | Palatal (-alveolar) | Velar | Uvular | Pharyn- geal | Glottal |
| | | Bilabial | median | lateral | Palatal (-alveolar) | Velar | Uvular | Pharyn- geal | Glottal |
|---|---|---|---|---|---|---|---|---|---|
| Plosive/ Affricate | tenuis | p | t | | tʃ | k | q | | ʔ |
| Plosive/ Affricate | aspirated | pʰ | tʰ | | tʃʰ | kʰ | qʰ | | |
| Plosive/ Affricate | ejective | pʼ | tʼ | | tʃʼ | kʼ | qʼ | | |
| Fricative | tenuis | | s | | | | | ħ | h |
| Fricative | ejective | | sʼ | | | | | | |
| Nasal | plain | m | n | | | | | | |
| Nasal | glottalic | mˀ | nˀ | | | | | | |
| Liquid | plain | | r | l | j | w | | | |
| Liquid | glottalic | | rˀ | lˀ | jˀ | wˀ | | | |

- /ħ/ lowers close vowels, while /h/ does not. Based on Achumawi, the former is assumed to be pharyngeal.

=== Vowels ===
Atsugewi language has basically only three vowels: /a/, /u/, and /i/; [e] is the allophone of /i/ while [o] is the allophone of /u/. However, it has been supported by Leonard Talmy (1972) that there are instances such as the word ce "the eye(s)" where e can be analyzed as a proper phoneme.

== Bibliography ==
- Bright, William. (1965). [Review of A history of Palaihnihan phonology by D. L. Olmsted]. Language, 41 (1), 175–178.
- Golla, Victor. California Indian Languages. Berkeley: University of California Press, 2011. ISBN 978-0-520-26667-4.
- Good, Jeff. (2004). A sketch of Atsugewi phonology. Boston, MA. (Paper presented at the annual meeting of the Society for the Study of the Indigenous Languages of the Americas, January 8–11).
- Good, Jeff; McFarland, Teresa; & Paster, Mary. (2003). Reconstructing Achumawi and Atsugewi: Proto-Palaihnihan revisited. Atlanta, GA. (Paper presented at the annual meeting of the Society for the Study of the Indigenous Languages of the Americas, January 2–5).
- Mithun, Marianne. (1999). The languages of Native North America. Cambridge: Cambridge University Press. ISBN 0-521-23228-7 (hbk); ISBN 0-521-29875-X.
- Olmsted, David L. (1954). Achumawi-Atsugewi non-reciprocal intelligibility. International Journal of American Linguistics, 20, 181–184.
- Olmsted, David L. (1956). Palaihnihan and Shasta I: Labial stops. Language, 32 (1), 73–77.
- Olmsted, David L. (1957). Palaihnihan and Shasta II: Apical stops. Language, 33 (2), 136–138.
- Olmsted, David L. (1958). International Journal of American Linguistics, 24, 215–220.
- Olmsted, David L. (1959). Palaihnihan and Shasta III: Dorsal stops. Language, 35 (4), 637–644.
- Olmsted, David L. (1961). Atsugewi morphology I: Verb Inflection. International Journal of American Linguistics, 27, 91–113.
- Olmsted, David L. (1964). A history of Palaihnihan phonology. University of California publications in linguistics (Vol. 35). Berkeley: University of California Press.
- Olmsted, David L. (1984). A Lexicon of Atsugewi (Survey of California and Other Indian Languages, 5).
- Talmy, Leonard. (n.d.). Midway phonological analysis of Atsugewi. (Unpublished notes).
- Talmy, Leonard. (1972). Semantic structures in English and Atsugewi. (Doctoral dissertation, University of California, Berkeley).
