= White Horse, California =

Unincorporated community in California, United States

White Horse
- Unincorporated community
- Location in California White Horse (the United States)
- Coordinates: 41°18′40″N 121°23′54″W
- Country: United States
- State: California
- County: Modoc
- Elevation: 4,423 ft (1,348 m)

White Horse (also, Whitehorse and Kinyon) is an unincorporated community in Modoc County, California, United States. It is located on the former Great Northern Railway Hambone Line, off the Bieber Line, that connected with the McCloud River Railroad. 25 miles (40 km) west-northwest of Adin, 0.7 miles (1.1 km) east of Whitehorse Flat Reservoir and 47 miles (76 km) west-southwest of Alturas, at an elevation of 4423 feet (1348 m).

The White Horse post office opened in 1930, changed its name to Kinyon in 1952, and closed in 1964.
