= Day, California =

Unincorporated community in California, United States

Day
- Unincorporated community
- Location in California Day (the United States)
- Coordinates: 41°12′42″N 121°22′28″W
- Country: United States
- State: California
- County: Modoc
- Elevation: 3,645 ft (1,111 m)

Day is an unincorporated community in Modoc County, California, United States. It is located 22 miles (35 km) west of Adin, at an elevation of 3645 feet (1111 m).

A post office operated at Day from 1888 to 1925 and from 1926 to 1953.

The lightning-sparked Day Fire in 2014 started just north of the community, ultimately destroying six structures and injuring seven people.
