= Mountain Union School District =

School district in California, United States

Mountain Union Elementary School District

Address
- 30365 Highway 299 East Montgomery Creek, California, 96065; United States

District information
- Type: Public
- Grades: K–8
- NCES District ID: 0627040

Students and staff
- Students: 64 (2020–2021)
- Teachers: 5.0 (FTE)
- Staff: 8.99 (FTE)
- Student–teacher ratio: 12.8:1

Other information
- Website: www.muesd.org

Mountain Union Elementary School District is a public school district based in Shasta County, California, United States.
