= Atsugewi =

Native American people of Northeastern California

Total population
- 200 (1977), 1,350 combined with Achomawi (2000)

Regions with significant populations
- California

Languages
- English, formerly Atsugewi

Religion
- traditional tribal religion

Related ethnic groups
- other members of the Pit River Tribe, including Achomawi

The Atsugewi are Native Americans residing in northeastern California, United States. Their traditional lands are near Mount Shasta, specifically the Pit River drainage on Burney, Hat, and Dixie Valley or Horse Creeks. They are closely related to the Achomawi and consisted of two groups (the Atsugé and the Apwaruge). The Atsugé ("pine-tree people") traditionally are from the Hat Creek area, and the Apwaruge ("juniper-tree people") are from the Dixie Valley. They lived to the south of the Achomawi.

== History ==
The Atsugewi traditionally lived by hunting and gathering and lived in small groups without centralized political authority. There was a cultural division into two smaller bands, based on the area of habitation. Inhabitants of Hat Creek were known as the "pine tree people" or Atsuge. In turn the residents of Apwariwa or Dixie Valley were known as the "juniper tree people" or Mahuopani; or by the more common Apwaruge, named after the valley itself. Exchanges of gifts and commercial trades were very common between the two bands.

=== Neighboring cultures ===
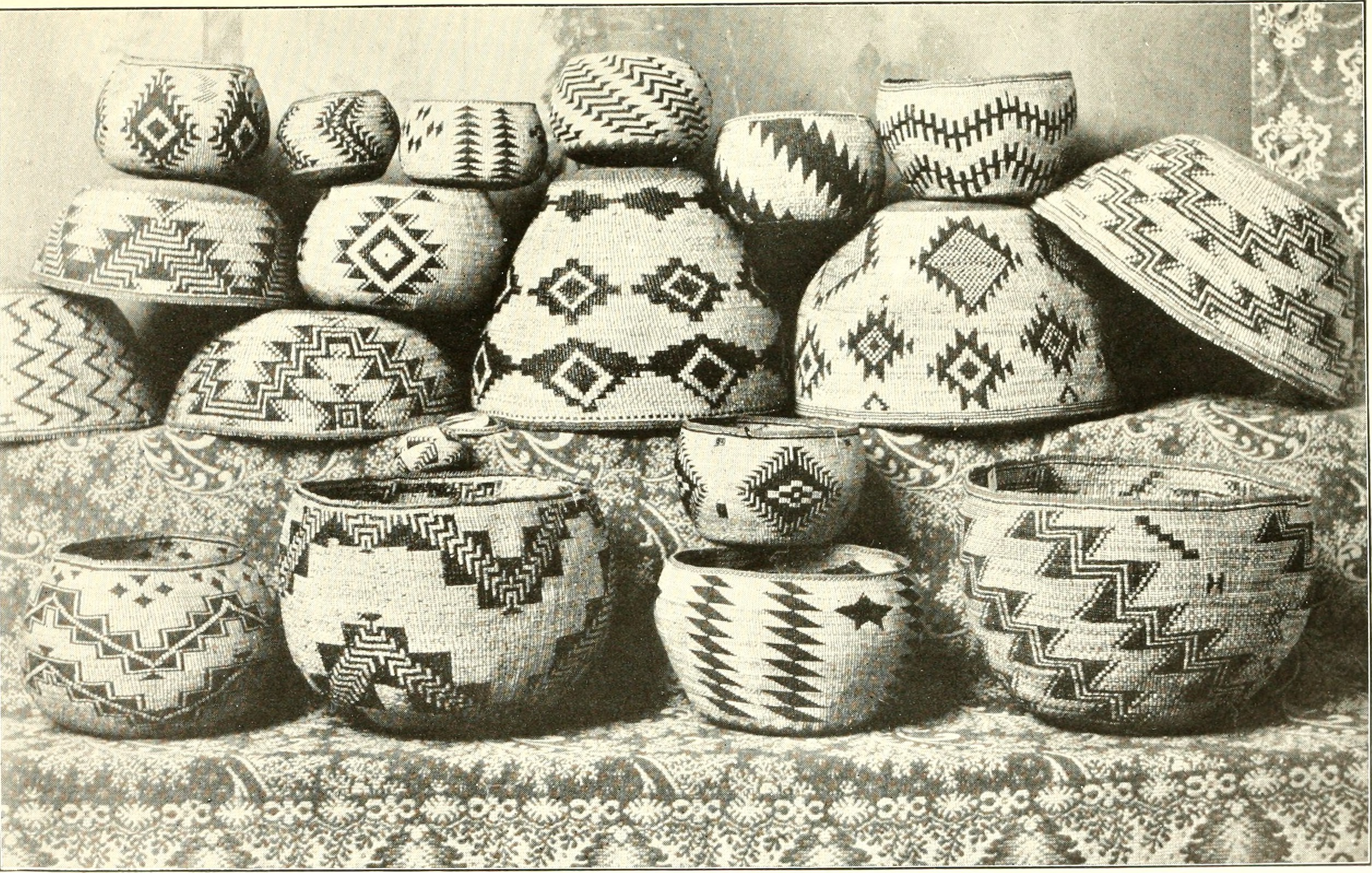
Basketry of the Hat Creek people

Relations with the nearby Achomawi settlements were varied for both Atsugewi bands. For example interactions between the territoriality adjacent band of Achomawi, the Illmawi, and the Atsuge were generally terse. These bad feelings arose in part from particular Atsuge trespassing upon Illmawi territory while traveling through to collect obsidian from the nearby Glass Mountain. In general however the Achomawi-speaking peoples were the principal trading destination for most Atsugewi manufactured goods and foodstuffs.

Contact between the Achomawi and Atsugewi speakers with the Klamath and Modoc to the north was largely undocumented. Despite this, Garth found it probable that there were extensive interactions between the cultures prior to the adoption of horses by the Northerners. Leslie Spier concluded that the Klamath and their Modoc relatives gained horses in the 1820s. Atsugewi settlements were likely attacked primarily by Modoc. Outsahone was applied to both the Klamath and Modoc peoples. Captured people would be sold into slavery at an intertribal slave market at The Dalles in present-day Oregon.

Atsugewi manufactured bows were prized by the neighboring Klamath, Paiute, Modoc and Achomawi. Called dumidiyi, the bows were of a similar design to those made by the Yurok. The best dumidiyi were made of yew wood by the Atsuge. As fairly peaceable relations developed with Paiute groups by 1870, these yew bows became a common trade item. The visiting Paiute would bring stockpiles of buckskins, red ochre, glass beads, guns, and especially shell currency created from Olivella biplicata shells in central and southern California. In return these trading goods were exchanged for Atsugewi basket and bow goods.

The Tolowa, Shasta, Yurok, Klamath, Atsugewi and groups of Western Mono and Paiute were among those known to have adopted buckskin clothing from the distant Plains Indians. For the Atsugewi, this relatively new clothing was called dwákawi. They did not employ a system of consistently smoking the fresh skins. Only buckskins for formal occasions were smoked, leaving daily worn buckskins prone to water damage. The Atsugewi potentially did not recognise the water resistance given by the smoking process. Garth conjectured that treating the buckskins with smoke was a recent development, having "a close connection with the introduction of buckskin clothing itself" but lacked direct evidence of this trend.

== Culture ==
=== Ethnobotany ===
A full list of Atsugewi plants can be found at http://naeb.brit.org/uses/tribes/19/ (68 documented uses).

=== Language ===
The Atsugewi language is a Palaihnihan language. As of 1994, an estimated three people spoke Atsugewi. The majority of the tribe speaks English.

=== Cuisine ===
Fish like salmon and acorns were eaten by the tribe. When the chief caught any deer or antelope, he would share it among all the Atsugewi people living in the village. Once winter ended and spring came around in California, people could finally go back out to collect food. The first plant they could find was tree moss. As time went on, the tribe gathered epos and camas roots, plus sunflower seeds.

== Tribes ==
Today many Atsugewi are enrolled in the Pit River Tribe, while some Atsugewi people are members of the Susanville Indian Rancheria.

== Population ==
Estimates for the pre-contact populations of most native groups in California have varied substantially. Alfred L. Kroeber estimated the combined 1770 population of the Achumawi and Atsugewi as 3,000. A more detailed analysis by Fred B. Kniffen arrived at the same figure. T. R. Garth (1978:237) estimated the Atsugewi population at a maximum of 850.

Kroeber estimated the combined population of the Achumawi and Atsugewi in 1910 as 1,100. The population was given as about 500 in 1936.

== See also ==
- Atsugewi language
- Atsugewi traditional narratives
- Achomawi

== Bibliography ==
- Kniffen, Fred B. (1928), Achomawi Geography, University of California Publications in American Archaeology and Ethnology, vol. 23, Berkeley, CA: University of California Press, pp. 297–332
- Kroeber, Alfred Louis (9 July 2006) [1925], Handbook of the Indians of California, Kessinger Publishing, ISBN 978-1-4286-4492-2
- Garth, Thomas R. (1953), Atsugewi Ethnography, Anthropological Records, vol. 14, Berkeley: University of California Press
- Golla, Victor (2011), California Indian Languages, Berkeley and Los Angeles: University of California Press, ISBN 978-0-520-26667-4
- Spier, Leslie (1930). Kroeber, Alfred L.; Lowie, Robert (eds.). Klamath Ethnography. Berkeley: University of California Press. Archived from the original on 2021-01-14.
- Waldman, Carl (September 2006), Encyclopedia of Native American tribes, Infobase Publishing, ISBN 978-0-8160-6274-4
