= Big Valley, Lassen County, California =

Unincorporated community in California, United States

Big Valley is a small unincorporated community in Lassen County, California, United States. As of July 2007, its population was 1600. It is located 3 miles (4.8 km) northeast of Bieber, at an elevation of 4124 feet above sea level.

== History ==
This town came to being due to the California Gold Rush. A post office operated at Big Valley from 1873 to 1875 and from 1876 to 1877. A newspaper, the Big Valley Gazette was printed from 1893 through 1956. The name historically refers to the geographic valley between the ranges which is drained by Pit River and Ash Creek.
