= Glottalic consonant =

Speech sound produced in large part by the glottis

In phonetics, a glottalic consonant is a consonant produced with some important contribution (movement or closure) of the glottis. Glottalic sounds may involve motion of the larynx upward or downward, as the initiator of an egressive or ingressive glottalic airstream mechanism respectively. An egressive glottalic airstream produces ejective consonants, while an ingressive glottalic airstream produces implosive consonants. Ejectives are almost always voiceless stops (plosives) or affricates, while implosives are almost always voiced stops.

However, when a sound is said to be glottalized, this is often not what is meant. Rather, glottalization usually means that a normal pulmonic airstream is partially or completely interrupted by closure of the glottis. Sonorants (including vowels) may be glottalized in this fashion. There are three ways this can be represented in the International Phonetic Alphabet: (a) with an apostrophe; (b) with a superscript glottal stop; or (c) with an under-tilde. For example, the Yapese word for 'sick' with a glottalized m could be transcribed [mʼaar], [mˀaar] or [m̰aar]. (In some conventions, the apostrophe is placed above the letter.) When an obstruent is glottalized but still uses a pulmonic airstream, it may be written ⟨ˀp⟩, ⟨ˀt⟩, ⟨ˀts⟩, ⟨ˀtʃ⟩, ⟨ˀʈ⟩, ⟨ˀc⟩, ⟨ˀk⟩, ⟨ˀkʷ⟩, ⟨ˀq⟩ etc.

The constriction of the larynx and surrounding tissues when pronouncing a glottalized resonant may cause the larynx to rise (usually) or occasionally to fall. However, this is not normally interpreted as an ejective or implosive airstream mechanism, but rather individual variation in the glottalization.

A language may have more than one kind of glottalic consonant. However, a language that has one kind is not particularly likely to have others. For example, languages in the Americas which have both ejectives and glottalized sonorants may reflect an areal feature rather than an inherent feature common to the sounds in question. Since none of the three types are very common, languages containing more than one type are relatively rare.

== Distribution in the world's languages ==
This section gives the distribution of "ejective and ejective-like consonants, implosive and implosive-like consonants, and glottalized resonants" according to the number of languages in which these sounds occur, the geographical location of these languages, and the total number of consonants in the languages. Note that fewer than 10% of the extant languages were surveyed; future research could change some of the conclusions here.

In the text accompanying his map, Maddieson writes:

At least some glottalized consonants occur in the consonant inventories of 154 of the 566 languages surveyed for this chapter, that is, in a little over a quarter of the languages (27.2%). Among the three classes of these consonants as defined above, ejectives are more widely found than implosives, and glottalized resonants are the least widespread. Ejectives or ejective-like consonants occur in 92 (16.3%) languages in the survey, implosives or implosive-like consonants occur in 75 (13.3%), and glottalized resonants in just 29 (5.1%). [...] It should thus be borne in mind that the terms ejective and implosive are being used here to refer to somewhat more inclusive classes of consonants than is traditional in the phonetic literature. [...] An overwhelming majority (135 out of 151) [that is, almost 90%] of the languages in the survey with implosives or with ejectives do not include members of the other class in their consonant inventories; on the other hand, a majority (22 out of 29) [about 75%] of the languages with glottalized resonants also have ejectives.

Maddieson includes features such as stiff voice (but not breathy voice).

=== Geographic distribution ===
It appears that these types of consonants cluster in geographic regions more strongly than they cluster in language families (areal distribution rather than genealogical, according to Maddieson).

==== Ejectives ====
Over half of the languages with ejectives are in the Western Hemisphere. Maddieson says:

They are particularly found along the Andean cordillera in the south, in Mexico and Guatemala, and in the more northwesterly parts of North America. Most strikingly, the consonant inventories of almost all the diverse indigenous languages of northern California, Oregon and Washington, British Columbia, the Yukon and Alaska include ejectives. [...] The dense cluster of languages in the Caucasus with ejectives includes languages of four different families. [...] Itelmen and Yapese [show] that consonants of this type can occasionally develop in geographical isolation.

Clusters elsewhere include the Semitic languages of Ethiopia and neighbouring countries.

==== Implosives ====
Over half of the languages with implosives are in sub-Saharan Africa; another big cluster is in Southeast Asia. Only 16% of the languages with implosives occur elsewhere in world. Maddieson says that about three-quarters of the languages that have both ejectives and implosives occur in eastern and southern Africa.

==== Glottalized resonants ====
Two-thirds of the languages with glottalized resonants are in the Americas. Nearly half of them co-occur with ejectives in the cluster from California to the Northwest Territories of Canada. Glottalized resonants are found only in three languages with ejectives outside the Western Hemisphere; Maddieson suggests:

The association between glottalized resonants and ejectives might best be viewed as a result of overlapping patterns of spread in a single area, and not as the consequence of any particular linguistic dependence between the occurrence of these two classes of consonants.

=== Glottalized consonants compared to total number of consonants ===
Maddieson believes that complex consonants, requiring "more intricate coordination" of different parts of the mouth and throat, are more likely to occur in languages with larger numbers of contrasting consonant phonemes. He says:

About 10% of the languages with small consonant inventories [18 or fewer consonants] have any glottalized consonants, whereas two-thirds of those with large inventories [34 or more consonants] include one or more glottalized consonants, and the proportion increases with each increase in overall inventory size.

== See also ==
- Glottalization
- Guttural
