= Palaihnihan languages =

Language family

Palaihnihan
- Palaihnih, Laikni
- Geographic distribution: California
- Extinct: 2013 (Achumawi)
- Linguistic classification: Hokan ?: Shasta–Palaihnihan ?; Palaihnihan
- Proto-language: Proto-Palaihnihan
- Subdivisions: Atsugewi; Achumawi

Language codes
- Glottolog: pala1350

Palaihnihan (also Palaihnih) is a small extinct language family of northeastern California. It consists of two closely related languages:

- Palaihnihan
  - † Atsugewi
  - † Achumawi (ís siwa wó disi, also known as Achomawi, Pit River Indian)

== Genetic relations ==
The Palaihnihan family is often connected with the hypothetical Hokan stock. Proposed special relationships within Hokan include Palaihnihan with Shastan (known as Shasta-Achomawi) and within a Kahi sub-group (also known as Northern Hokan) with Shastan, Chimariko, and Karuk.

== Proto-language ==
Proto-Palahnihan
- Reconstruction of: Palaihnihan languages

The original reconstruction of proto-Palaihnihan suffered from poor quality data. David Olmsted's dictionary depends almost entirely upon de Angulo, who did not record the phonological distinctions consistently or well, and carelessly includes Pomo vocabulary from a manuscript in which he (de Angulo) set out to demonstrate that Achumawi and Pomo are not related. William Bright has also pointed out problems with Olmsted's methods of reconstruction. The reconstruction is being refined with newer data.

=== Vowels ===
Good, McFarland & Paster (2003) conclude there were at least three vowels, *a *i *u, and possibly marginal *e, along with vowel length and ablaut.

=== Consonants ===
Consonants were as follows:

		Bilabial	Alveolar		Palatal (-alveolar)	Velar	Uvular	Pharyn- geal	Glottal
		Bilabial	median	lateral	Palatal (-alveolar)	Velar	Uvular	Pharyn- geal	Glottal
Plosive/ Affricate	tenuis	p	t		tʃ	k	q		ʔ
Plosive/ Affricate	aspirated	pʰ	tʰ		tʃʰ	kʰ	qʰ		
Plosive/ Affricate	ejective	pʼ	tʼ		tʃʼ	kʼ	qʼ		
Fricative			s					ħ	h
Nasal	plain	m	n						
Nasal	glottalic	mˀ	nˀ						
Liquid	plain		r	l	j	w			
Liquid	glottalic		rˀ	lˀ	jˀ	wˀ			

== Bibliography ==
- Bright, William; Olmsted, D. L. (1965). "Review of A history of Palaihnihan phonology by D. L. Olmsted". Language. 41 (1). Baltimore: Linguistic Society of America: 175–178. doi:10.2307/411871. JSTOR 411871.
- Good, Jeff; McFarland, Teresa; Paster, Mary (January 2–5, 2003). Reconstructing Achumawi and Atsugewi: Proto-Palaihnihan revisited (PDF). Annual meeting of the Society for the Study of the Indigenous Languages of the Americas. Atlanta, GA.
- Gursky, Karl-Heinz (1987). "Achumawi und Pomo, eine besondere Beziehung?". Abhandlungen der völkerkundlichen Arbsgemeinschaft. 57. Nortorf.
- Mithun, Marianne (1999). The Languages of Native North America. Cambridge: Cambridge University Press. ISBN 0-521-29875-X.
- Nevin, Bruce E. (August 1991). Obsolescence in Achumawi: Why Uldall Too?. American Indian Languages Conferences. Occasional Papers on Linguistics. Vol. 16. University of California, Santa Cruz: Department of Linguistics, Southern Illinois University at Carbondale. pp. 97–127.
- Nevin, Bruce E. (1998). Aspects of Pit River phonology (PDF) (PhD thesis). University of Pennsylvania.
- Olmsted, David L. (1954). "Achumawi–Atsugewi non-reciprocal intelligibility". International Journal of American Linguistics. 20 (3): 181–184. doi:10.1086/464275. S2CID 144619581.
- Olmsted, David L. (1956). "Palaihnihan and Shasta I: Labial stops". Language. 32 (1): 73–77. doi:10.2307/410654. JSTOR 410654.
- Olmsted, David L. (1957). "Palaihnihan and Shasta II: Apical stops". Language. 33 (2): 136–138. doi:10.2307/410725. JSTOR 410725.
- Olmsted, David L. (1959). "Palaihnihan and Shasta III: Dorsal stops". Language. 35 (4): 637–644. doi:10.2307/410603. JSTOR 410603.
- Olmsted, David L. (July 1958). "Atsugewi Phonology". International Journal of American Linguistics. 24 (3): 215–220.
- Olmsted, David L. (1964). A History of Palaihnihan Phonology. University of California Publications in Linguistics. Vol. 35. Berkeley: University of California Press.
