= Achumawi language =

Endangered language of California

Achumawi
- ís siwa wó disi
- Native to: United States
- Region: northeast California
- Ethnicity: 1,000 Achumawi people
- Extinct: 2013
- Revival
- Language family: Hokan ?: Shasta–Palaihnihan ?; Palaihnihan; Achumawi

Language codes
- ISO 639-3: acv
- Glottolog: achu1247
- ELP: Achumawi
- Achumawi is classified as Critically Endangered by the UNESCO Atlas of the World's Languages in Danger.

The Achumawi language (also Achomawi or Pit River language) is the indigenous language spoken by the Pit River people in the northeast corner of present-day California. The term Achumawi is an anglicization of the name of the Fall River band, acúmmááwí, from acúmmá 'river'. Originally there were nine bands, with dialect differences primarily between upriver (Atwamwi, Astariwawi; Kosalektawi, Hammawi, Hewisedawi dialects) and downriver (Madesiwi, Itsatawi, Ilmawi, and Achumawi (proper) dialects), demarcated by the Big Valley mountains east of the Fall River valley.

== Genetic relationships ==
Together, Achumawi and Atsugewi are said to comprise the Palaihnihan language family separate from the adjacent and related Shastan family. The basis of this grouping is weakened by poor quality of data. David Olmsted's data dictionary depends almost entirely upon de Angulo, and carelessly includes Pomo vocabulary from a manuscript in which he (de Angulo) set out to demonstrate that Achumawi and Pomo are not related. William Bright and Shirley Silver questioned Olmsted's results and methods of reconstruction. Kroeber (1925:279) acknowledged that

there would have been almost as much justification for separating Atsugewi from Achomawi and erecting it into a separate family as for keeping Achomawi and Shasta apart, as ethnologists did for half a century. What lay at the bottom of this inconsistence was that the Atsugewi live in a region topographically tributary to the larger Achomawi habitat; that the two tribes were in close association and friendly; and that they followed very similar customs.

The phenomenon of non-reciprocal intelligibility is a matter of bilingualism in the smaller and more dependent of two exogamous communities; Kroeber (1925:308) estimated that the Achumawi were ten times more numerous than the Atsugewi.

== Phonology ==
=== Consonants ===
Achumawi has 29 consonants. The stops and affricate (aside from the marginally contrastive glottal stop) are in three series, plain, aspirated, and laryngealized or glottalized. The aspirated series is contrastive only syllable-initially and probably derives historically from the voiceless-released first member of a consonant cluster, as in the neighboring Yana language. This is seen morphophonemically in e.g. it "I, me", itʰˑú "my, mine".

		Bilabial	Alveolar		Palatal (-alveolar)	Velar	Uvular	Pharyn- geal	Glottal
		Bilabial	median	lateral	Palatal (-alveolar)	Velar	Uvular	Pharyn- geal	Glottal
Plosive/ Affricate	tenuis	p	t		tʃ	k	q		ʔ
Plosive/ Affricate	aspirated	pʰ	tʰ		tʃʰ	kʰ	qʰ		
Plosive/ Affricate	laryngeal	pˀ	tˀ		tʃˀ	kˀ	qˀ		
Fricative			s					ħ	h
Sonorant	plain	m	n	l	j	w			
Sonorant	glottalic	mˀ	nˀ	lˀ	jˀ	wˀ			

- The laryngeal stops are not ejective; they contrast with the tenuis stops by the laryngealization of adjacent vowels.

The plain-aspirated distinction is neutralized and realized with voiceless release in syllable-final position and before another consonant; the aspirates are much more fortis than this voiceless release. Syllable-initial plain stops are voiceless (without voiceless release) after long vowel or when geminate (long), and voiced elsewhere. The laryngealized stops are similar in articulation to the ejective glottalized stops of neighboring languages, but more lenis, that is, not "popped" unless an unusual effort is made at articulating the distinction.

=== Vowels ===
The language has a 5-vowel system /i e a o u/. Two degrees of length are contrastive for both vowels and consonants. Long vowels are typically more peripheral and short vowels more centralized, phonetically [ɪ ɛ ʌ ə ʊ]. The mid vowels /e o/ are probably of secondary origin historically, as in Yana and Atsugewi. A short centralized vowel [ə ɨ] appears epenthetically between the consonants of certain prefixes, as in lhúpta "let's go!". Vowel length assimilates the next successive laryngeal state, that is, the second mora of a long vowel is devoiced before a plain or aspirated consonant (preaspiration) and word finally before silence, and is laryngealized before a laryngealized consonant. In upriver dialects vowels and plain stops are more fully voiced. In downriver dialects, utterance-final syllables may be devoiced or whispered, especially under interrogative intonation. A light syllable consists of a consonant and vowel (CV), and a heavy syllable either contains a long vowel (CVˑ) or is closed with a second consonant (CVC).

=== Tones ===
Unlike the neighboring and related language Atsugewi, Achumawi has contrastive high and low tones.

== Morphology ==
The Achumawi language does not have gender but it has two forms of the copula ("to be") distinguishing animate and inanimate. The verb stem comprises one or more verb roots plus optional adverbial affixes. Inflectional affixes on verbs distinguish singular, dual, and plural number, and suffixes may optionally express severality and plurality of nouns. Many nouns and adjectives are derived from verb stems or participles, and some verb stems are formed by noun incorporation. The language has independent adjectives and numerals.

== Current status ==
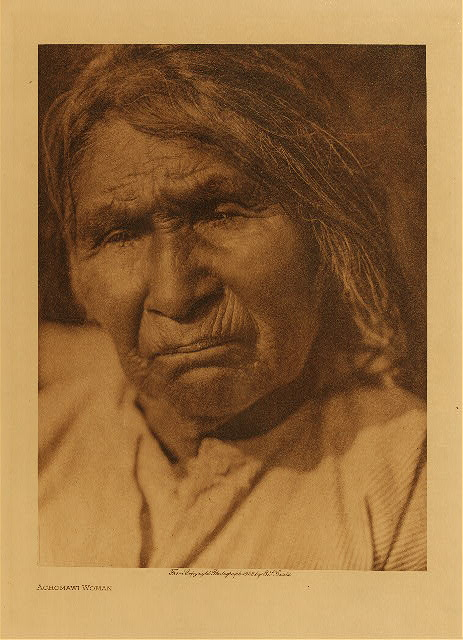
An elderly Ahjumawi Indian woman, c. 1920

Today, the Achumawi language is extinct. Out of an estimated 1500 Achumawi people remaining in northeastern California, perhaps ten spoke the language in 1991, with only eight in 2000. The last speaker died in 2013.

As of 2013, a mobile app was planned for the language.

Louise Davis, who lives in northern California, is almost tearful when she describes hearing people using the language of her Pit River tribe in conversation for the first time. It happened years ago when an older man from another part of the state met up with her grandmother.

It was such a powerful, emotional experience that Davis is driven to use flashcards at home with her children and do whatever it takes to preserve the language.

"You can say things in our language that you can't say in English," she said.

Testing out a language app in February [2013], she said she couldn't wait to see it being used among young people in the tribe.

== Bibliography ==
- Bright, William (1965). "[Review of A history of Palaihnihan phonology by D. L. Olmsted]". Language. 41 (1): 175–178. doi:10.2307/411871. JSTOR 411871.
- Bauman, James (1980). Introduction to the Pit River language and culture. Anchorage, AK: National Bilingual Materials Development Center, University of Alaska.
- Good, Jeff (January 8–11, 2004). A sketch of Atsugewi phonology. Annual Meeting of the Society for the Study of the Indigenous Languages of the Americas. Boston.
- Good, Jeff; McFarland, Teresa; Paster, Mary (January 2–5, 2003). Reconstructing Achumawi and Atsugewi: Proto-Palaihnihan revisited. Annual Meeting of the Society for the Study of the Indigenous Languages of the Americas. Atlanta.
- Kroeber, Alfred L. (1925). Handbook of the Indians of California. Bureau of American Ethnology Bulletin. Vol. 78. Smithsonian Institution.
- Mithun, Marianne (1999). The Languages of Native North America. Cambridge University Press. ISBN 0-521-23228-7.
- Nevin, Bruce E. (1991). "Obsolescence in Achumawi: Why Uldall Too?". Occasional Papers on Linguistics: Papers from the American Indian Languages Conferences, held at the University of California, Santa Cruz, July and August 1991. Vol. 16. Department of Linguistics, Southern Illinois University at Carbondale. pp. 97–127.
- Nevin, Bruce E. (1998). Aspects of Pit River phonology (PDF) (PhD thesis). University of Pennsylvania.
- Nevin, Bruce E. (2019). "Why Proto-Palaihnihan is neither". doi:10.13140/RG.2.2.33917.20966.
- Olmsted, David L. (1954). "Achumawi-Atsugewi non-reciprocal intelligibility". International Journal of American Linguistics. 20 (3): 181–184. doi:10.1086/464275.
- Olmsted, David L. (1956). "Palaihnihan and Shasta I: Labial stops". Language. 32 (1): 73–77. doi:10.2307/410654. JSTOR 410654.
- Olmsted, David L. (1957). "Palaihnihan and Shasta II: Apical stops". Language. 33 (2): 136–138. doi:10.2307/410725. JSTOR 410725.
- Olmsted, David L. (1959). "Palaihnihan and Shasta III: Dorsal stops". Language. 35 (4): 637–644. doi:10.2307/410603. JSTOR 410603.
- Olmsted, David L. (1964). A history of Palaihnihan phonology. University of California Publications in Linguistics. Vol. 35. Berkeley: University of California Press.

=== Dictionaries ===
- Bauman, James; Miles, Ruby; Leaf, Ike. Pit River Teaching Dictionary. Anchorage, AK: National Bilingual Materials Development Center, University of Alaska.
- Nevin, Bruce (2020). "Achumawi Dictionary". Webonary.
- Olmsted, D. L. (1966). Achumawi dictionary. Berkeley: University of California Press.
