= Portage Viaduct =

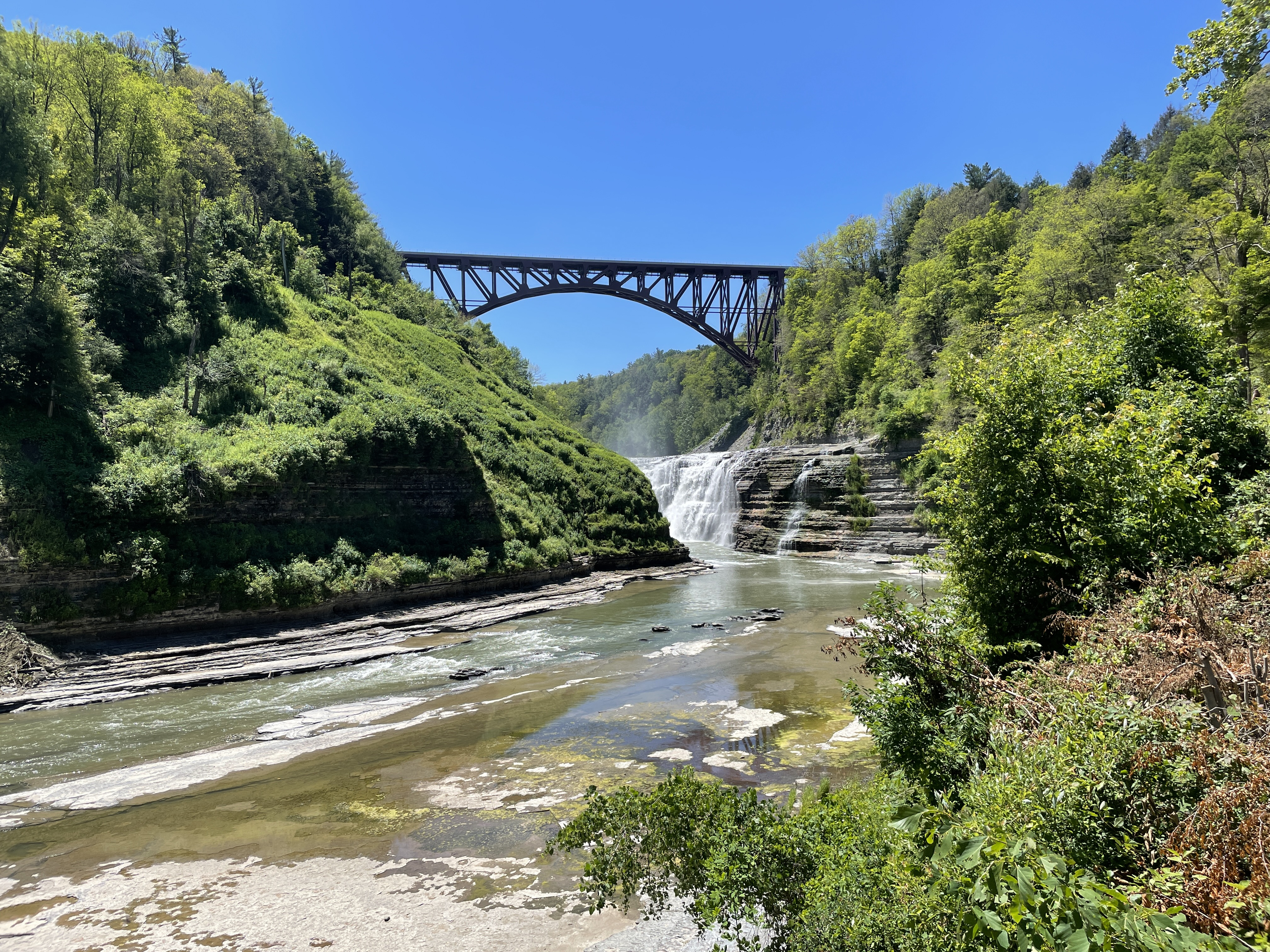
- Portage Viaduct and the Upper Falls in 2022.
- Coordinates: 42.5778°N 78.0495°W
- Carries: Norfolk Southern railroad traffic
- Crosses: Genesee River
- Locale: Portageville, New York, USA

Characteristics
- Design: Deck arch bridge
- Material: Steel
- Total length: 963 feet (293.5 m)
- Longest span: 483 feet (147.2 m) each span
- No. of spans: 1 (2 piers)
- Clearance below: 240 feet (73.2 m)

Rail characteristics
- No. of tracks: 1
- Track gauge: 4 ft 8 1/2 in (1,435 mm) standard gauge
- Structure gauge: AAR for the width only overhead open or clear

History
- Designer: Modjeski & Masters, Inc
- Constructed by: American Bridge Company
- Construction start: October 27, 2015; 10 years ago
- Opened: December 11, 2017; 8 years ago

Location
- Interactive map of Portage Viaduct

The Portage Viaduct, officially known as the Genesee Arch Bridge since 2017, is a steel arch railroad bridge over the Genesee River in Letchworth State Park, Livingston County, New York. It is the third bridge at this location: the original timber bridge burned in 1875 and was replaced by an iron bridge, which lasted until it was replaced by the current steel bridge in 2017. It carries the Southern Tier Line of Norfolk Southern Railway.

== Previous bridges ==
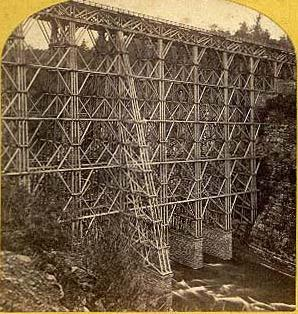
The first bridge, a wooden trestle, in 1864

The Erie Railroad Company built a wooden trestle bridge over the Genesee River just above the Upper Falls in the mid-1800s. Construction started on July 1, 1851, and the bridge opened on August 14, 1852. At the time, it was the longest and tallest wooden bridge in the world. In the early morning hours of May 6, 1875, the bridge was destroyed in a tremendous fire. The bridge was a total loss, leaving only the stone bridge abutments.

Immediately after the fire, officials of the Erie Railroad Company moved quickly to replace the wooden bridge with one built of iron. Construction began on June 8, 1875, and the bridge opened for traffic on July 31, 1875. The bridge was 820 feet (250 m) long and 240 feet (73 m) high. This bridge was used until December 10, 2017. Despite a weight restriction, the 400-ton Nickel Plate 765 steam locomotive passed over the bridge with passenger coaches as part of a heritage excursion in August 2015.

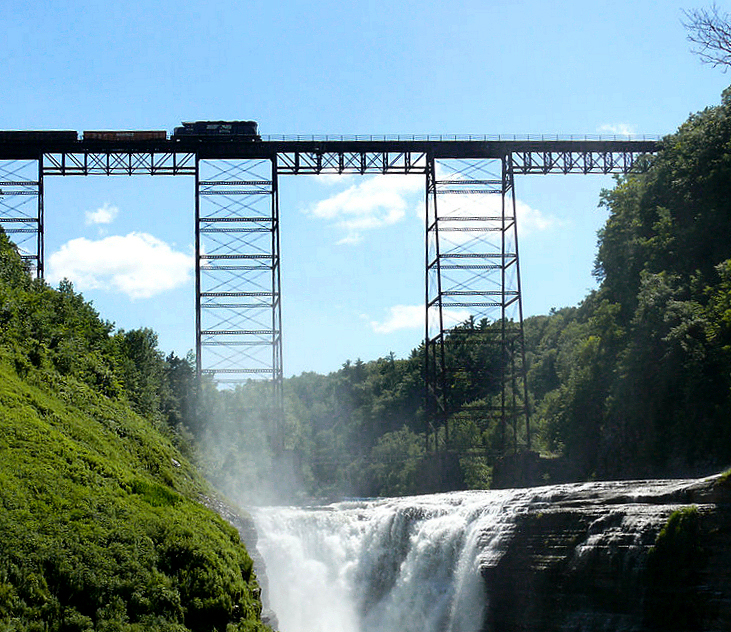
Upper Falls with train passing Portage Viaduct

Popular local rumor contends that the Portage Bridge was used for a famous scene in the 1986 movie Stand By Me. In reality, the bridge used in the movie is the Lake Britton Bridge in McArthur–Burney Falls Memorial State Park near Redding, California.

== Current bridge ==
On November 29, 2011, Norfolk Southern Railway announced plans to build a new steel bridge approximately 75 feet (23 m) to the south of the 1875 bridge. Norfolk Southern offered the 1875 bridge to the State of New York as a tourist viewing platform of the Upper Falls, but the State declined it, citing a lack of available funding.

A steel arch design for the new bridge, estimated to cost $71 million, was approved in late 2014. Construction started on October 27, 2015. Following the normal seasonal closing of the Portageville park auto entrance road for the winter in 2015, it remained closed until completion of the project in 2018. By late 2016, surveying work for the foundation of the new bridge was underway. In March 2017, construction of the main arch began.

On December 11, 2017, the first train crossed the new bridge. The last pieces of the 1875 iron bridge were demolished on the morning of March 20, 2018. Norfolk Southern formally named the new bridge the "Genesee Arch Bridge" on May 24, 2018.

In June 2026, the Union Pacific Big Boy 4014, the largest and heaviest steam locomotive produced, crossed the bridge on its coast to coast heritage excursion, with Union Pacific and Norfolk Southern units and passenger coaches in tow.
