= Burney, California =

Unincorporated community in California

Burney
- Census-designated place
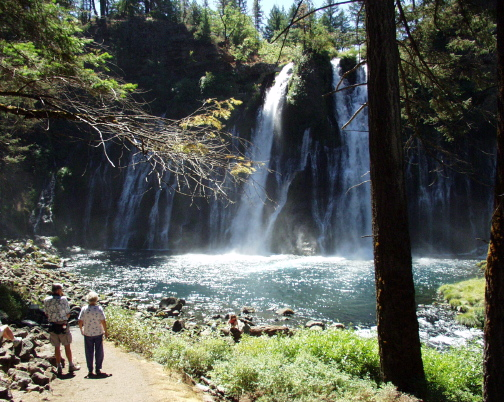
- Burney Falls

- Location in Shasta County and the state of California
- Coordinates: 40°52′50″N 121°40′0″W
- Country: United States
- State: California
- County: Shasta

Area
  - Total: 5.38 sq mi (13.93 km^{2})
  - Land: 5.37 sq mi (13.92 km^{2})
  - Water: 0.0039 sq mi (0.01 km^{2}) 0.09%
- Elevation: 3,123 ft (952 m)

Population (2020)
  - Total: 3,000
  - Density: 558.3/sq mi (215.58/km^{2})
- Time zone: UTC-8 (Pacific (PST))
  - Summer (DST): UTC-7 (PDT)
- ZIP code: 96013
- Area code: 530
- FIPS code: 06-09122
- GNIS feature ID: 0277481
- Website: Burney Chamber of Commerce

Burney is an unincorporated town and census-designated place (CDP) in Shasta County, California, United States. Its population is 3,000 as of the 2020 census, down from 3,154 from the 2010 census. Burney is located on State Route 299, about 4 miles (6.4 km) west of its junction with State Route 89.

== History ==
Before American settlement, the area along Burney Creek was inhabited by the Atsugewi, a Pit River people who held several southern tributaries of the Pit River, apart from the neighboring Achomawi.

Burney was named after Samuel Burney, a settler in the area in the 1850s. Burney was found dead in the valley in 1857, which came to be called "the valley where Burney died", and finally just "Burney".

== Geography ==
Burney has several areas for fly fishing, with wild brown and native rainbow trout in many nearby rivers and streams, including Burney Creek. Other attractions in the area include McArthur–Burney Falls Memorial State Park, home to Burney Falls, a 129-foot (39 m) waterfall on Burney Creek that is fed by springs and flows at about 100 million US gallons (380,000 m^{3}) a day. The town of Burney sits at the base of an extinct volcano called Burney Mountain. The peak is 7,863 ft tall (2,397 m).

=== Climate ===
This region experiences warm (but not hot) and dry summers, with no average monthly temperatures above 71.6 °F (22.0 °C). According to the Köppen Climate Classification system, Burney has a warm-summer Mediterranean climate, abbreviated "Csb" on climate maps.

Climate data for Burney (1948–2012)
| Month | Jan | Feb | Mar | Apr | May | Jun | Jul | Aug | Sep | Oct | Nov | Dec | Year |
|---|---|---|---|---|---|---|---|---|---|---|---|---|---|
| Record high °F (°C) | 68 (20) | 74 (23) | 80 (27) | 89 (32) | 96 (36) | 103 (39) | 108 (42) | 108 (42) | 105 (41) | 94 (34) | 82 (28) | 65 (18) | 108 (42) |
| Mean daily maximum °F (°C) | 43.6 (6.4) | 48.4 (9.1) | 54.3 (12.4) | 61.5 (16.4) | 70.5 (21.4) | 80.1 (26.7) | 89 (32) | 87.7 (30.9) | 81 (27) | 67 (19) | 51.6 (10.9) | 43.2 (6.2) | 64.8 (18.2) |
| Mean daily minimum °F (°C) | 21.1 (−6.1) | 22.9 (−5.1) | 25.8 (−3.4) | 29.4 (−1.4) | 36.4 (2.4) | 41.2 (5.1) | 46.4 (8.0) | 43.6 (6.4) | 36.9 (2.7) | 29 (−2) | 24.8 (−4.0) | 21.4 (−5.9) | 31.6 (−0.3) |
| Record low °F (°C) | −20 (−29) | −18 (−28) | 1 (−17) | 12 (−11) | 17 (−8) | 21 (−6) | 25 (−4) | 24 (−4) | 17 (−8) | 10 (−12) | −3 (−19) | −26 (−32) | −26 (−32) |
| Average precipitation inches (mm) | 4.53 (115) | 5.09 (129) | 3.95 (100) | 2.03 (52) | 1.49 (38) | 0.79 (20) | 0.16 (4.1) | 0.33 (8.4) | 0.4 (10) | 1.38 (35) | 2.56 (65) | 4.84 (123) | 27.55 (699.5) |
| Average snowfall inches (cm) | 11 (28) | 9 (23) | 7 (18) | 2 (5.1) | 0.3 (0.76) | 0 (0) | 0 (0) | 0 (0) | 0 (0) | 0.1 (0.25) | 5.7 (14) | 12 (30) | 47.1 (119.11) |
| Average precipitation days | 11 | 12.2 | 12.5 | 10.4 | 7.7 | 4.4 | 1.4 | 1.1 | 2.0 | 5.3 | 9.3 | 12.2 | 89.5 |
| Average snowy days (≥ 0.1 in) | 3.6 | 3.3 | 2.3 | 2.1 | 0.2 | 0.0 | 0.0 | 0.0 | 0.0 | 0.0 | 1.5 | 4.0 | 17 |
Source: WRCC

== Demographics ==
Historical population
| Census | Pop. | Note | %± |
|---|---|---|---|
| 1950 | 1,513 | | — |
| 1960 | 1,294 | | −14.5% |
| 1970 | 2,190 | | 69.2% |
| 1980 | 3,187 | | 45.5% |
| 1990 | 3,423 | | 7.4% |
| 2000 | 3,217 | | −6.0% |
| 2010 | 3,154 | | −2.0% |
| 2020 | 3,000 | | −4.9% |
U.S. Decennial Census; 1850–1870 1880–1890; 1900 1910 1920; 1930 1940 1950; 1960 1970 1980; 1990 2000 2010

=== 2020 census ===
As of the 2020 census, Burney had a population of 3,000. The population density was 558.3 inhabitants per square mile (215.6/km^{2}). The median age was 44.5 years. 23.5% of residents were under the age of 18 and 23.1% were 65 years of age or older. For every 100 females, there were 92.1 males, and for every 100 females age 18 and over, there were 88.5 males age 18 and over.

Racial composition as of the 2020 census
| Race | Number | Percent |
|---|---|---|
| White | 2,352 | 78.4% |
| Black or African American | 4 | 0.1% |
| American Indian and Alaska Native | 202 | 6.7% |
| Asian | 11 | 0.4% |
| Native Hawaiian and Other Pacific Islander | 3 | 0.1% |
| Some other race | 94 | 3.1% |
| Two or more races | 334 | 11.1% |
| Hispanic or Latino (of any race) | 346 | 11.5% |

The whole population lived in households. There were 1,271 households, of which 24.8% had children under the age of 18 living in them. Of all households, 46.3% were married-couple households, 6.2% were cohabiting couple households, 21.0% were households with a male householder and no spouse or partner present, and 26.4% were households with a female householder and no spouse or partner present. About 31.4% of all households were made up of individuals and 16.4% had someone living alone who was 65 years of age or older. The average household size was 2.36. There were 788 families (62.0% of all households).

There were 1,444 housing units at an average density of 268.8 units per square mile (103.8 units/km^{2}), of which 1,271 (88.0%) were occupied. Of the occupied units, 66.2% were owner-occupied and 33.8% were occupied by renters. The homeowner vacancy rate was 2.1% and the rental vacancy rate was 6.2%.

0.0% of residents lived in urban areas, while 100.0% lived in rural areas.

=== Income and poverty ===
In 2023, the US Census Bureau estimated that the median household income was $67,097, and the per capita income was $31,241. About 7.6% of families and 12.9% of the population were below the poverty line.

=== 2010 census ===
At the 2010 census Burney had a population of 3,154. The population density was 606.5 inhabitants per square mile (234.2/km^{2}). The racial makeup of Burney was 2,685 (85.1%) White, 13 (0.4%) African American, 233 (7.4%) Native American, 7 (0.2%) Asian, 2 (0.1%) Pacific Islander, 61 (1.9%) from other races, and 153 (4.9%) from two or more races. Hispanic or Latino of any race were 265 people (8.4%).

The census reported that 3,035 people (96.2% of the population) lived in households, 119 (3.8%) lived in non-institutionalized group quarters, and no one was institutionalized.

There were 1,262 households, 371 (29.4%) had children under the age of 18 living in them, 638 (50.6%) were opposite-sex married couples living together, 155 (12.3%) had a female householder with no husband present, 70 (5.5%) had a male householder with no wife present. There were 74 (5.9%) unmarried opposite-sex partnerships, and 5 (0.4%) same-sex married couples or partnerships. 344 households (27.3%) were one person and 150 (11.9%) had someone living alone who was 65 or older. The average household size was 2.40. There were 863 families (68.4% of households); the average family size was 2.87.

The age distribution was 751 people (23.8%) under the age of 18, 240 people (7.6%) aged 18 to 24, 681 people (21.6%) aged 25 to 44, 949 people (30.1%) aged 45 to 64, and 533 people (16.9%) who were 65 or older. The median age was 42.5 years. For every 100 females, there were 95.8 males. For every 100 females age 18 and over, there were 91.2 males.

There were 1,446 housing units at an average density of 278.0 per 1-square-mile (2.6 km^{2}), of the occupied units 797 (63.2%) were owner-occupied and 465 (36.8%) were rented. The homeowner vacancy rate was 2.2%; the rental vacancy rate was 7.4%. 1,833 people (58.1% of the population) lived in owner-occupied housing units and 1,202 people (38.1%) lived in rental housing units.

== Popular culture ==
Parts of the 1986 film Stand by Me were filmed within the vicinity of Burney and Fall River Mills, California. The scene in which the boys outrace a locomotive across a trestle was filmed at Lake Britton on the McCloud River Railroad, near McArthur–Burney Falls Memorial State Park, California.

== Politics ==
In the state legislature Burney is located in the 1st senatorial district, represented by Republican Megan Dahle, and the 1st Assembly district, represented by Republican Heather Hadwick.

Federally, Burney is in California's 1st congressional district, represented by Republican James Gallagher.
