= Pit 3 Dam =

Pit-3 Dam
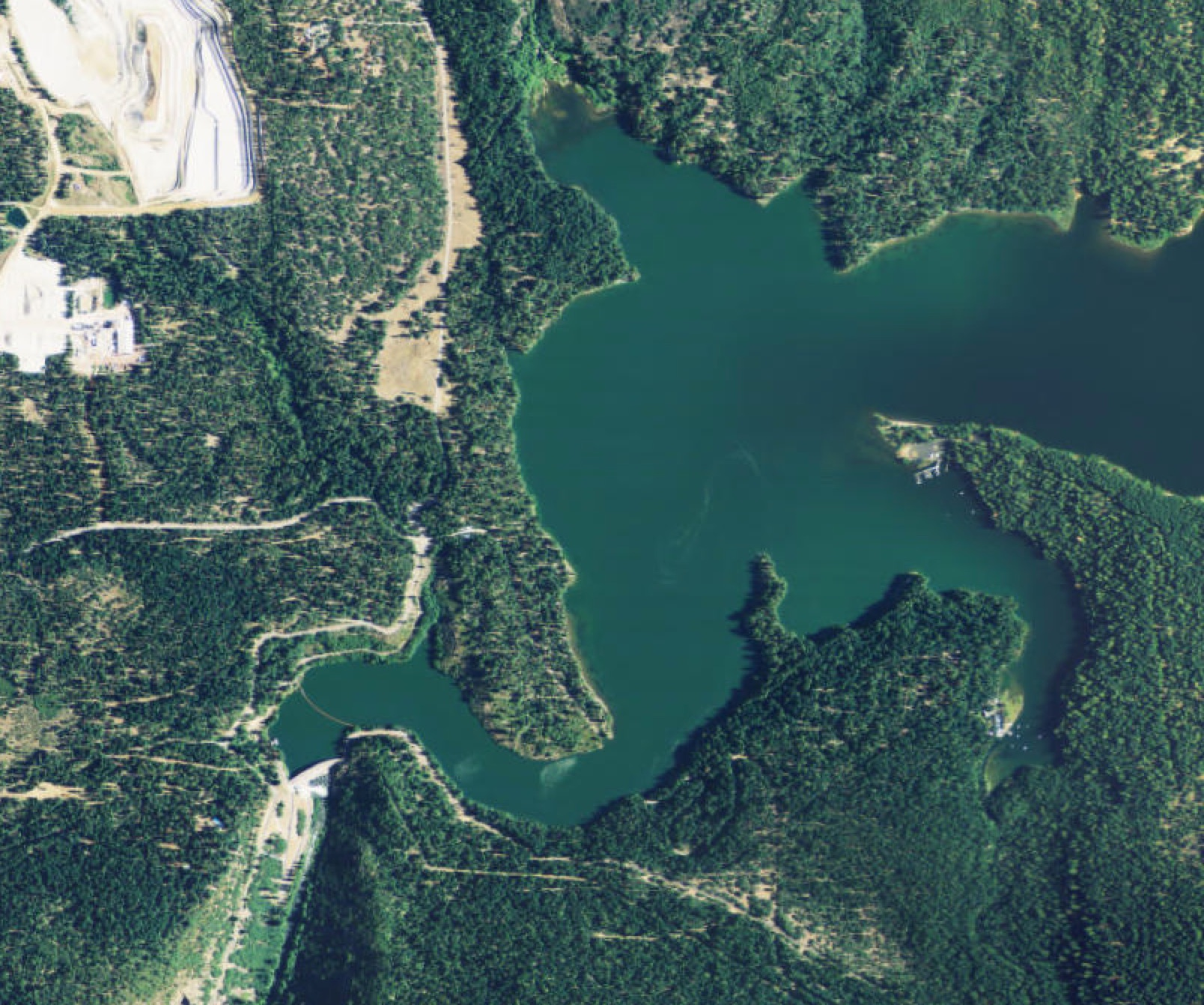
- Satellite view

- Location of Pit-3 Dam in California
- Official name: Pit Number Three Dam
- Country: United States
- Location: Shasta County, California
- Coordinates: 41°01′18″N 121°40′33″W
- Owner: Pacific Gas and Electric Company

Dam and spillways
- Impounds: Pit River
- Height: 130 ft (40 m)
- Length: 494 ft (151 m)
- Width (crest): 30 ft (9.1 m)
- Width (base): 110 ft (34 m)

Reservoir
- Creates: Lake Britton
- Total capacity: 41,877 acre⋅ft (51,655,000 m^{3})
- Catchment area: 4,700 square miles (12,000 km^{2})
- Surface area: 1,265 acres (5.12 km^{2})

Power Station
- Type: Run-of-the-river
- Hydraulic head: 600 feet (180 m)
- Installed capacity: 69.9 MW
- Annual generation: 333,606,000 KWh (2001–2012)

Pit-3 Dam (also known as Pit Number Three Dam and Dam Number Three) is a hydroelectric dam on the Pit River in northern California in the United States. It forms Lake Britton, and is owned by the Pacific Gas and Electric Company (PG&E).

== Specifications ==
Pit 3 is a curved concrete gravity dam with a height of 130 ft (40 m) and length of 494 ft (151 m). The dam has a gated spillway with three steel gates and three inflatable rubber gates. An intake structure at the dam diverts water into a 19-foot (5.8 m) diameter, 21,203-foot (6,463 m) long tunnel that connects to the Pit 3 hydroelectric plant. There are three 23.3 MW generators, for a total capacity of 69.9 MW.

Lake Britton, formerly known as Pit 3 Reservoir, has a maximum water level of 2,737.5 ft (834.4 m); however, the lake is usually kept below 2,736.5 ft (834.1 m) to avoid flooding parts of McArthur–Burney Falls Memorial State Park. The gross storage capacity is 41,877 acre-feet (51,655,000 m^{3}) and the usable (active) storage is 14,443 acre-feet (17,815,000 m^{3}).

The lake level changes on a weekly basis with greater drawdowns during the weekdays for power generation, and refilling on the weekends. In addition to generating power at the Pit 3 hydroelectric station, the reservoir also helps regulate water flowing through the Pit 4 and Pit 5 stations downstream.

The dam is the place where Pacific Crest Trail crosses the Pit River.

== History ==
Construction was completed in 1925 (101 years ago).

== See also ==
- List of dams and reservoirs in California
