= Hat Creek =

Hat Creek may refer to:

- Hat Creek (California), a stream in California
- Hat Creek, California, a town in California
- Hat Creek (Georgia), a stream in Georgia
- Hat Creek (British Columbia), a stream in Canada
