= Portageville =

Portageville may refer to:

- Portageville, New York
  - Portageville Viaduct, train bridge
- Portageville, Missouri
