= Burney Falls =

Waterfall in Shasta County, California

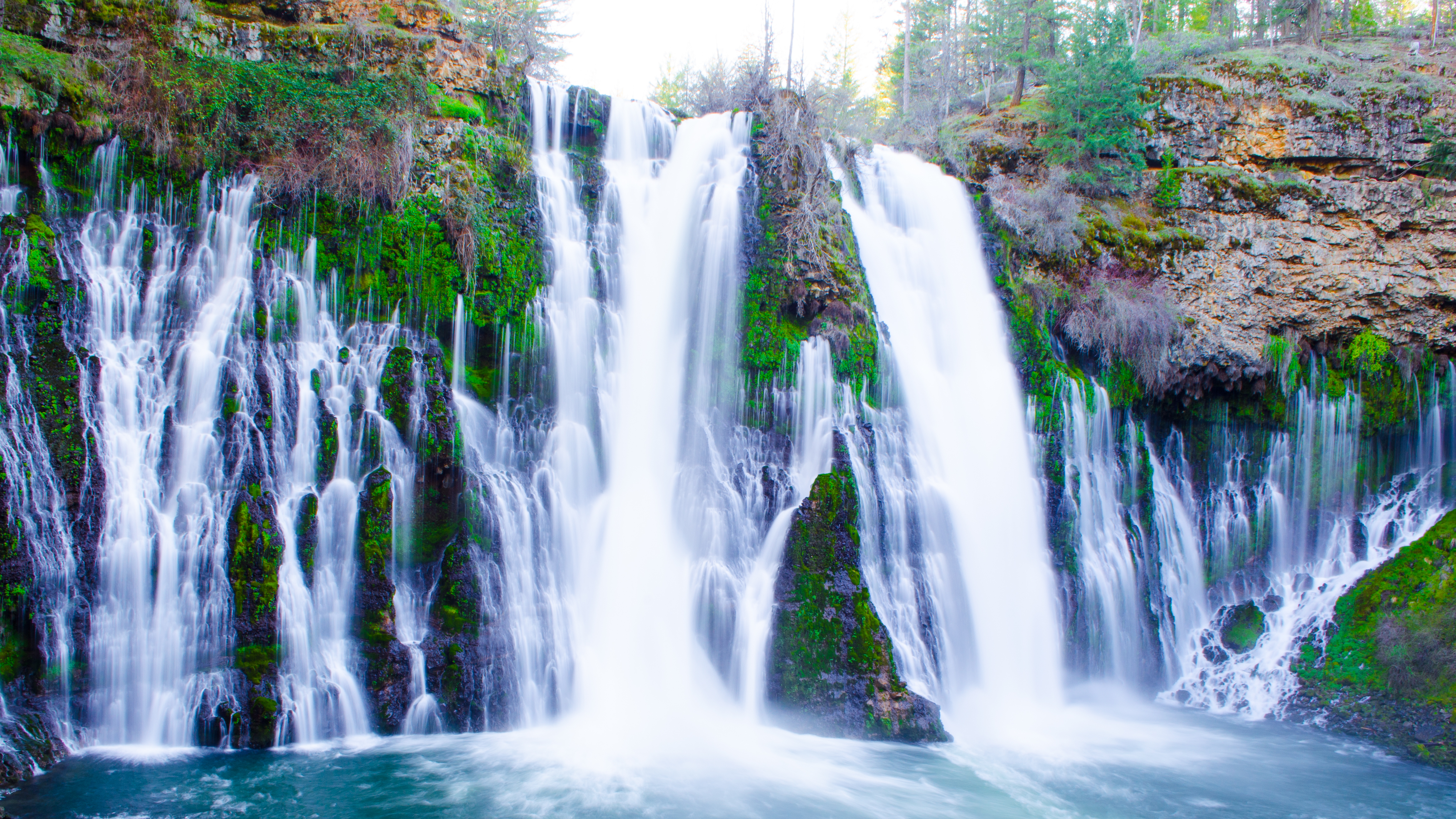
- The falls in full flow in April

- Location within California
- Location: Shasta County, California, US
- Coordinates: 41°00′39″N 121°39′10″W
- Type: Cataract
- Total height: 114 feet (35 m)
- Number of drops: 1
- Total width: 250 feet (76 m)
- Watercourse: Burney Creek
- Average flow rate: 195.0 cu ft/s (5.52 m^{3}/s)

U.S. National Natural Landmark
- Designated: 1954

Burney Falls is a waterfall on Burney Creek, within McArthur-Burney Falls Memorial State Park, in Shasta County, California.

The water comes from underground springs above and at the falls, which are 129 feet (39 m) high, and provides an almost constant flow rate of 379,000,000 liters (83,000,000 imp gal; 100,000,000 U.S. gal) per day, even during the dry summer months. Burney Creek is a tributary of the Pit River which has its mouth on the Lake Britton reservoir to the north.

The falls are an example of river drainage regulated by stratigraphically controlled springs, and of a waterfall formed by undercutting of horizontal strata.

Called "the Eighth Wonder of the World" by President Theodore Roosevelt, the falls are "at their most intense ... during the spring, from early April through October, when snowmelt is at its peak". The falls were declared a National Natural Landmark in December 1954. In March 2021, a National Geographic article declared the site to be one of "northern California's most spectacular waterfalls".

The water temperature rarely gets higher than 42 °F (6 °C) but the pool below the falls is a popular location for catch-and-release fly-fishing. The Redding tourism website states that the falls "can be enjoyed from above at lookout point", and preferably from the pool at the base of the falls, accessed via a trail.

Some of the waterfalls scenes for Willow (1988) were shot at the falls, although Powerscourt Waterfall in Ireland was also used for filming. Other movies with scenes filmed at Burney Falls include Stand by Me (1986), The Parson and the Outlaw (1957) and Tarzan's Fight for Life (1958).

== See also ==
- List of waterfalls
- List of waterfalls in California
