= Hat Creek (California) =

River in the United States

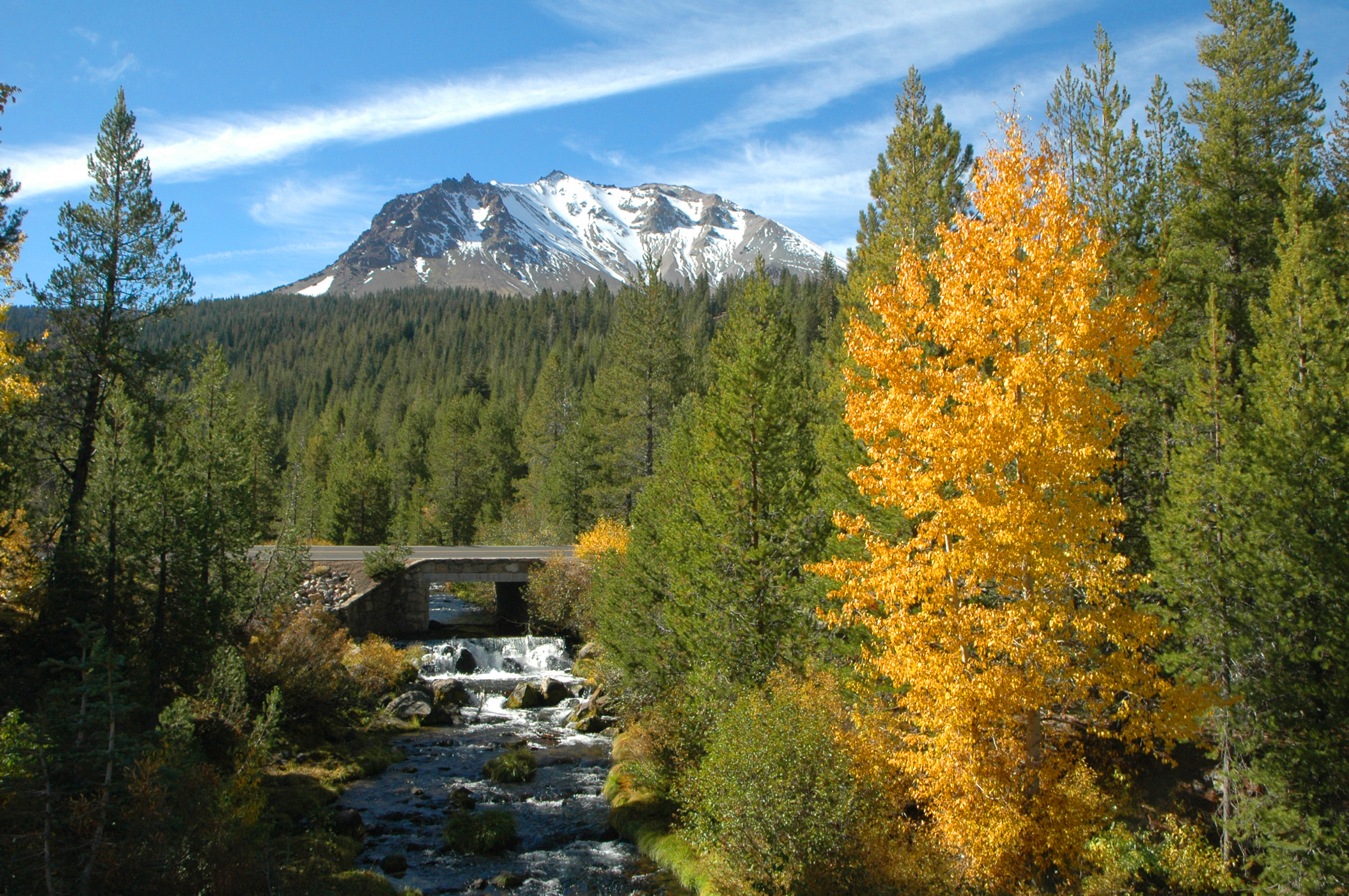
- Hat Creek in Lassen Volcanic National Park
- Native name: haatiiw̓iw (Achumawi)

Location
- Country: United States
- State: California
- Cities: Old Station, Hat Creek, Cassel

Physical characteristics
- Source: Confluence of East and West Forks
  - location: Dersch Meadows, Lassen Volcanic National Park
  - coordinates: 40°31′02″N 121°27′19″W
  - elevation: 6,302 ft (1,921 m)
- Mouth: Pit River
  - location: Lake Britton
  - coordinates: 40°59′23″N 121°34′43″W
  - elevation: 2,736 ft (834 m)
- Length: 48.7 mi (78.4 km)
- Discharge
  - location: Burney (combined USGS stations #11359300/Burney No.2 Powerhouse and #11359200/Hat Creek near Burney)
  - average: 472.2 cu ft/s (13.37 m^{3}/s)

Hat Creek (Achumawi: haatiiw̓iw) is a 48.7-mile-long (78.4 km) stream and tributary of the Pit River, which is located in Shasta County of northern California.

The creek rises in two forks on the eastern slopes of Lassen Peak in Lassen Volcanic National Park, and flows northward through Lassen National Forest to its mouth at Lake Britton near Burney, California.

Hat Creek is so named because a surveyor lost his hat there.

== Wild Trout Waterway ==
The lower three and a half miles of the creek has been designated by the California Department of Fish and Game as a "Wild Trout Waterway," with restrictive catch limits. This area has a similar geology to the chalk streams of southern England, and is considered a classic trout stream. The trout population is made of wild rainbow and brown trout of up to 20 inches (510 mm) in length.

== Towns ==
The main towns along Hat Creek are Hat Creek and Old Station, which is closer to Lassen Park. The Hat Creek Radio Observatory is located near the town of Hat Creek.

== Lahar flow ==
During the May 19, 1915, eruption of Mount Lassen, a lahar swept down Hat Creek.

== See also ==
- Pit River topics
- Rivers of Shasta County, California
- List of rivers of California
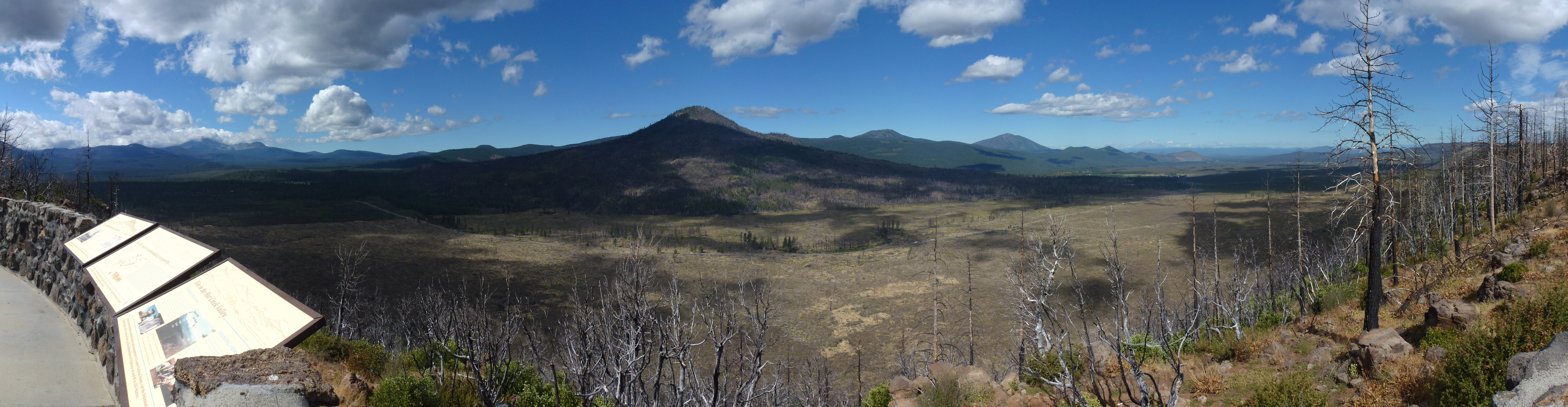
The upper Hat Creek Valley.

There is a small mountain in Lassen National Park where the stream starts. It is square topped and looks like a hat, therein lies the derivation of the name!
