= Pit 7 Dam =

Pit No. 7 Dam
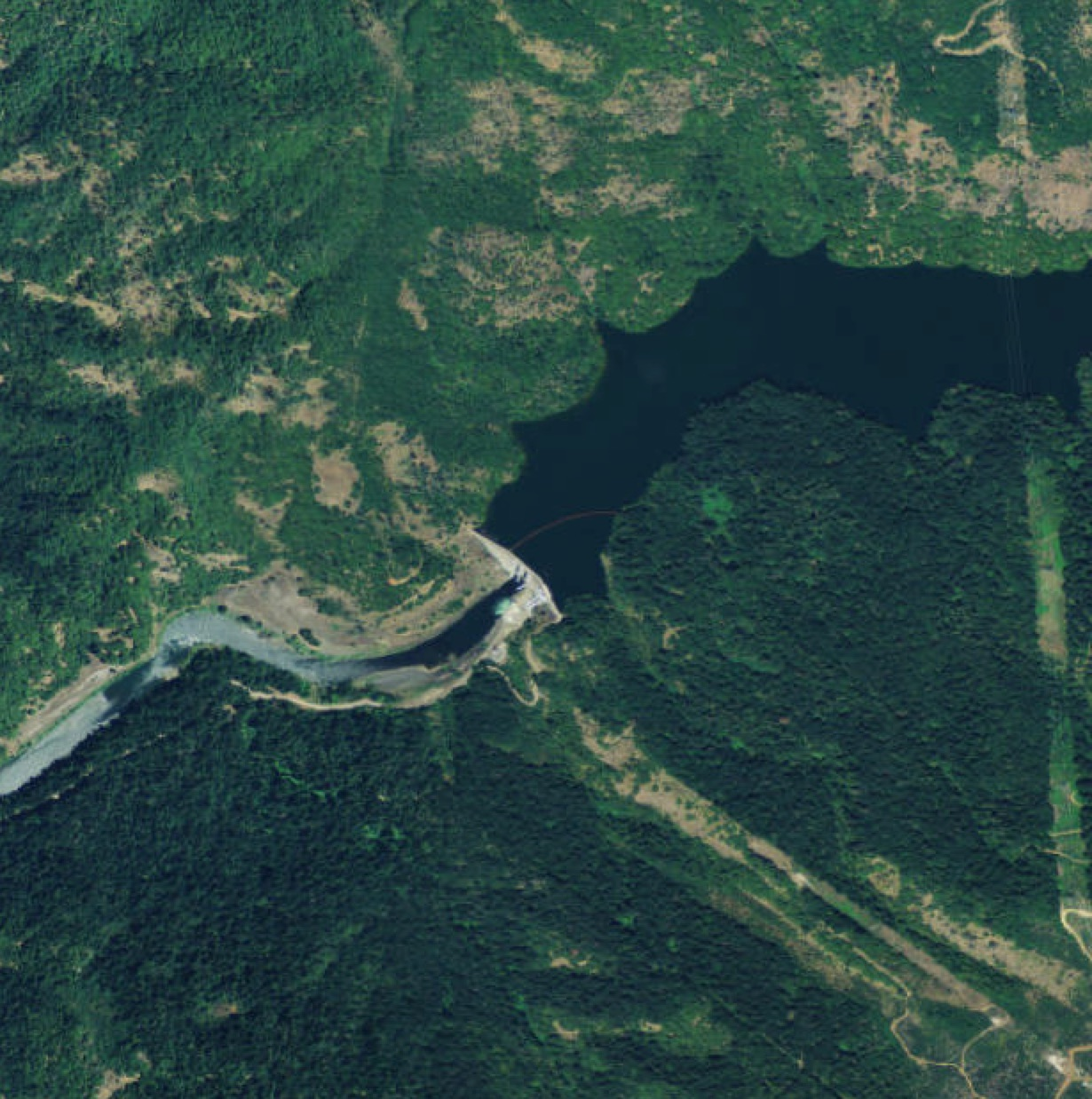
- Satellite view
- Interactive map of Pit No. 7 Dam
- Country: United States
- Location: Shasta County, California
- Coordinates: 40°50′53″N 121°59′26″W
- Opening date: 1965; 61 years ago
- Owner: PG&E

Dam and spillways
- Type of dam: Concrete arch-gravity
- Impounds: Pit River
- Height: 230 ft (70 m)
- Length: 770 ft (230 m)
- Spillway capacity: 11,400 cu ft/s (320 m^{3}/s)

Reservoir
- Total capacity: 34,100 acre⋅ft (42,100,000 m^{3})
- Catchment area: 5,170 mi^{2} (13,400 km^{2})
- Surface area: 470 acres (190 ha)

Power Station
- Installed capacity: 110 MW (150,000 hp)
- Annual generation: 478,390,000 KWh (2001–2012)

Pit 7 Dam is a run-of-the-river hydroelectric dam across the Pit River in northern California. Located just upstream of Shasta Lake, it is a concrete arch-gravity structure and its powerhouse has a capacity of 110 megawatts (150,000 hp). The dam is owned by the Pacific Gas and Electric Company.

== See also ==
- List of dams and reservoirs in California
- List of lakes in California
