= Pit 5 Dam =

- Location of Pit 5 Dam in California
- Country: United States
- Location: Shasta County, California
- Coordinates: 40°59′30″N 121°52′16″W
- Purpose: Hydroelectric
- Opening date: 1944
- Owner: PG&E

Dam and spillways
- Impounds: Pit River
- Height (foundation): 58 ft (18 m)
- Length: 340 ft (100 m)

Reservoir
- Creates: Pit 5 Reservoir
- Total capacity: 330 acre⋅ft (410,000 m^{3})

Pit 5 Powerhouse
- Installed capacity: 160 MW
- Annual generation: 781,328,000 KWh (2001–2012)

Pit 5 Dam is a run-of-the-river hydroelectric dam on the Pit River in Shasta County, northeastern California, about 2 miles (3.2 km) south of Big Bend. It is part of the Pit 3-4-5 hydroelectric project owned by Pacific Gas & Electric Company.

== Specifications ==
The concrete gravity diversion dam is 58 feet (18 m) high and 340 feet (100 m) long. It has a gated spillway controlled by four 50 ft × 26.3 ft (15.2 m × 8.0 m) steel wheel gates, and a 30 in (76 cm) diameter river outlet for regular releases. An intake structure diverts water into a 5,109-foot (1,557 m) long penstock to the Pit 5 Tunnel forebay reservoir, from which a second 23,149-foot (7,056 m) tunnel connects to the Pit 5 power station. There are four 40 MW generating units, each fed by a 1,380-foot (420 m)-long penstock.

== History ==
The dam and power station were authorized in 1942 and constructed as a wartime project, and the first power was generated on April 29, 1944. Construction of the dam and power station dewatered a stretch of the Pit River known as the "Big Bend". When the projects were relicensed in 2007, a minimum 250 cu ft/s (7.1 m^{3}/s) release into the river was established, to provide recreation benefits such as boating and fishing, and to improve riparian habitat.

== See also ==
- List of dams and reservoirs in California
