= McArthur–Burney Falls Memorial State Park =

State park in California, United States

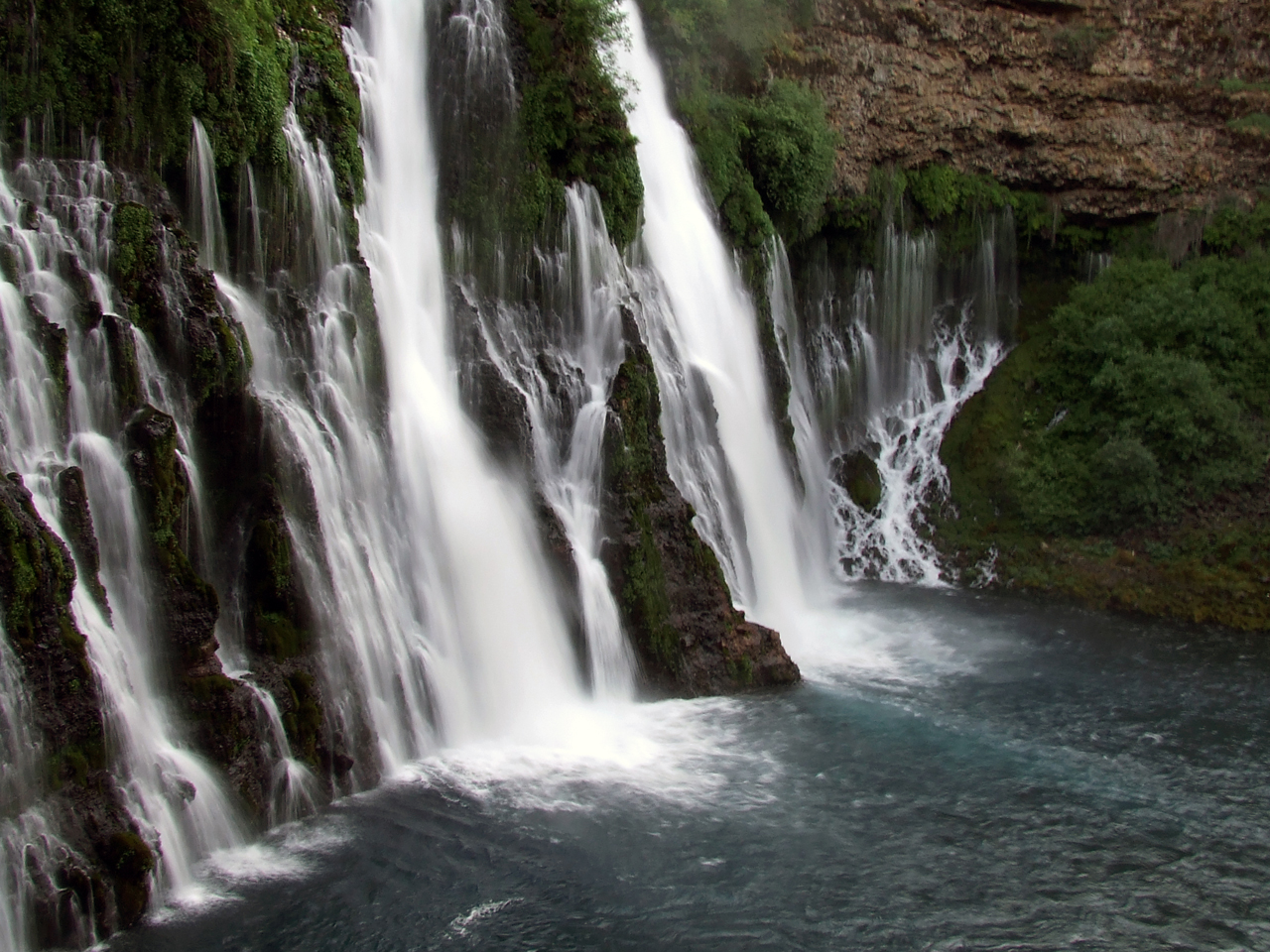
- Burney Falls

- Location within California Location within the United States
- Location: Shasta County, California
- Nearest city: Burney, California
- Coordinates: 41°1′N 121°39′W
- Area: 910 acres (370 ha)
- Governing body: California Department of Parks and Recreation

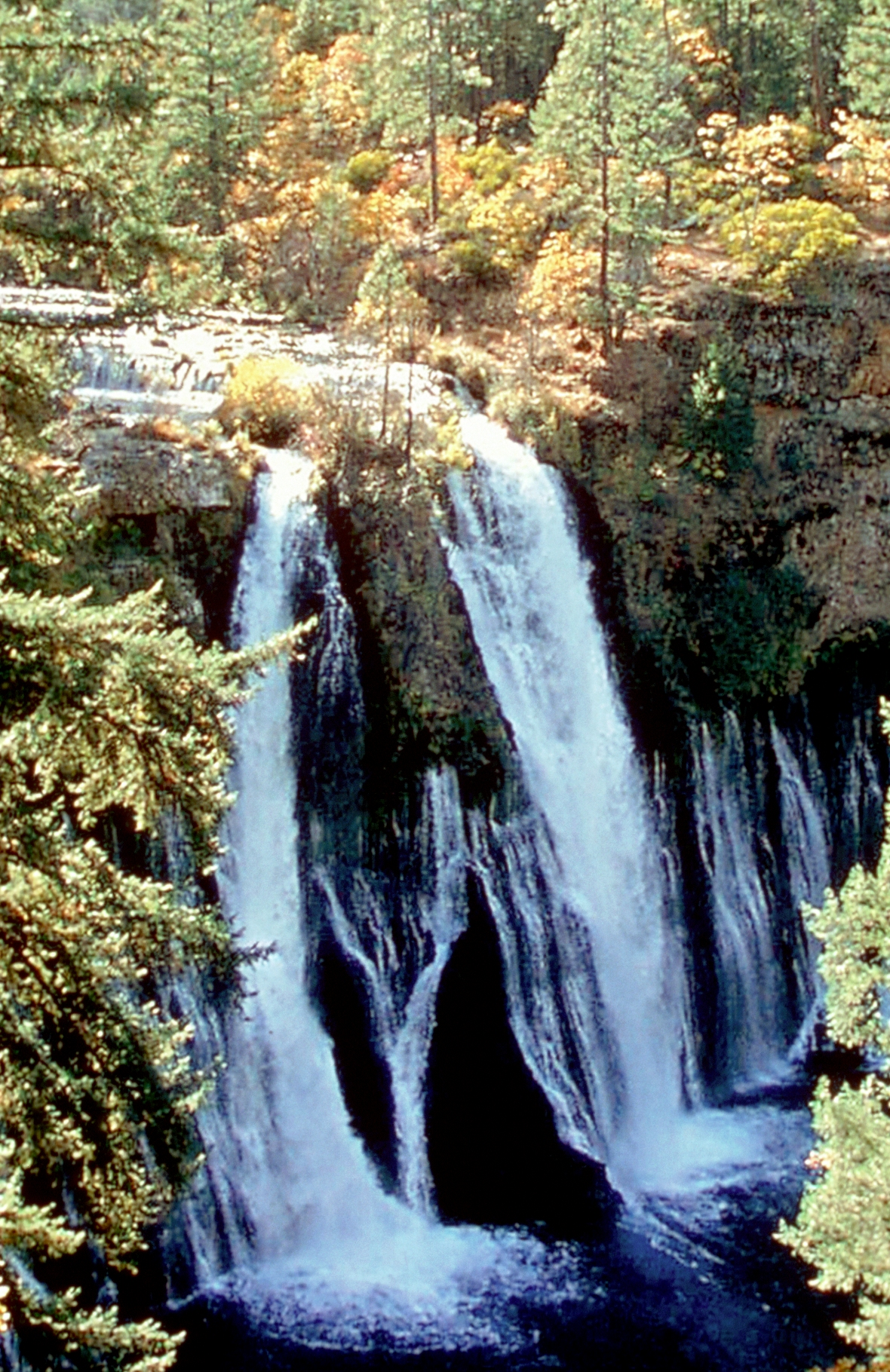
Burney Falls

McArthur–Burney Falls Memorial State Park is the second oldest state park in the California State Parks system, located approximately 6 miles (9.7 km) north of Burney, California. The park offers camping, fishing, watersports, hiking and horseback riding facilities. The park is mainly known for the waterfall, Burney Falls, at the entrance of the park. Wildlife in the park includes bass, trout, Steller's jay, squirrels, woodpeckers, deer, and on rare occasion, black bear.

== Geology ==
The park is within the Cascade Range and Modoc Plateau natural region, with 910 acres (370 ha) of forest and 5 miles (8.0 km) of streamside and lake shoreline, including a portion of Lake Britton.

The park's centerpiece is the 129-foot (39 m) Burney Falls. Burney Creek originates from the park's underground springs, with additional water coming from springs, which join the creek to create a mist-filled basin. Below the falls, the creek flows into Lake Britton.

The park's landscape was created by volcanic activity as well as erosion from weather and streams. This volcanic region is surrounded by mountain peaks and is covered by black volcanic rock, or basalt. Created over a million years ago, the layered, porous basalt retains rainwater and snow melt, which forms a large underground reservoir.

Within the park, the water emerges as springs at and above Burney Falls, where it flows at 100 million gallons every day (4.4 m^{3}/s).

== History ==
Burney Falls was named after pioneer settler Samuel Burney who lived in the area in the 1850s. The McArthur Family were pioneer settlers who arrived in the late 19th century. Descendants were responsible for saving the waterfall and nearby land from development, purchasing the property and presenting it as a gift to the state in the 1920s.

== Burney Creek ==
Burney Creek is a tributary of the Pit River, with its mouth on Lake Britton reservoir to the north. The creek is the only area within the park where fishing is allowed.

It is possible to go upstream ten yards of the falls, where the view is so obstructed by natural elements that it's difficult to discern one is close to the cascade.

== Recreation ==
=== Hiking ===
There are 5 miles (8.0 km) of hiking trails winding through the park's evergreen forests. The Pacific Crest Trail passes through the park, and the park store can be used as a general delivery mailing address for hikers. There is also a hike to the Pioneer's Cemetery, (the longest hike in the park at around 3 miles (4.8 km).) There are three main trails leading from the falls; The Falls Loop Trail, Burney Creek Trail, and the Headwaters Loop Trail – all of which start near the visitor center.

The primary trail is the Falls Loop Trail (0.75 miles (1.21 km)) that begins at the Burney Falls overlook. From there, it descends to the bottom of the falls, proceeds downstream to the Rainbow Footbridge. From there, it crosses Burney Creek and ascends back on the other side of the ravine (providing alternate views of the falls), and finally returning across the creek again via Fisherman's Bridge.

The first alternate trail is the Burney Creek Trail (1-mile (1.6 km)). It leads downstream from the Falls Loop Trail, at Rainbow Bridge, to Lake Britton and the swimming/boating area. It travels through some magnificent mixed coniferous forest and patches white diatomaceous earth. The second alternate is the Headwaters Trail (1-mile (1.6 km) loop) that loops upstream from the Fisherman's Bridge parking lot to the headwaters spring (feeding Burney Falls). The loop returns crossing the Pacific Crest Trail Footbridge, back downstream, and finally crossing Fisherman's Bridge back to Fisherman's parking lot.

=== Lake Britton ===
Also, a portion of Lake Britton (owned by PG&E) is accessible to all park visitors for swimming, boating, water sports, and a small portion is reserved for fishing. The water flowing into Lake Britton from Burney Creek stays at approximately 43 °F (6 °C)). The people who go boating are able to enjoy the 9 miles (14 km) long lake and are able to explore numerous nooks and crannies well beyond the boundaries of McArthur–Burney Falls Memorial State Park. These include a rail bridge that was used in the 1986 movie Stand By Me, the Pit River Dam, many independent boat docks, and a villa owned by the PG&E employee association. Canoes, kayaks, paddle boats, or motorized patio boats are available to rent.

== Notable Facts ==
- The railroad bridge scene from the 1986 film Stand By Me was filmed just outside the park on a bridge owned by the McCloud River Railroad over Lake Britton.
- Half of Burney Falls was seen in the 1988 George Lucas/Ron Howard movie Willow. The other half was digitally removed from the shots.
- The falls were called "the Eighth Wonder of the World" by President Theodore Roosevelt.
- The falls (behind them) is one of the few known nesting sites for the black swift
- Burney Falls were declared a National Natural Landmark in December 1984.

== See also ==
- List of California state parks
- Volcanic Legacy Scenic Byway
