= Hat Creek (Georgia) =

Physical characteristics
- Source
  - coordinates: 31.7182356°N 83.6510016°W
- Mouth
  - coordinates: 31.5590750°N 83.4259943°W

Hat Creek is a stream in the U.S. state of Georgia. It is a tributary to the Alapaha River.

Hat Creek was named from a pioneer incident when a man lost his hat near the stream.
