= Lake Britton =

Reservoir in California, USA

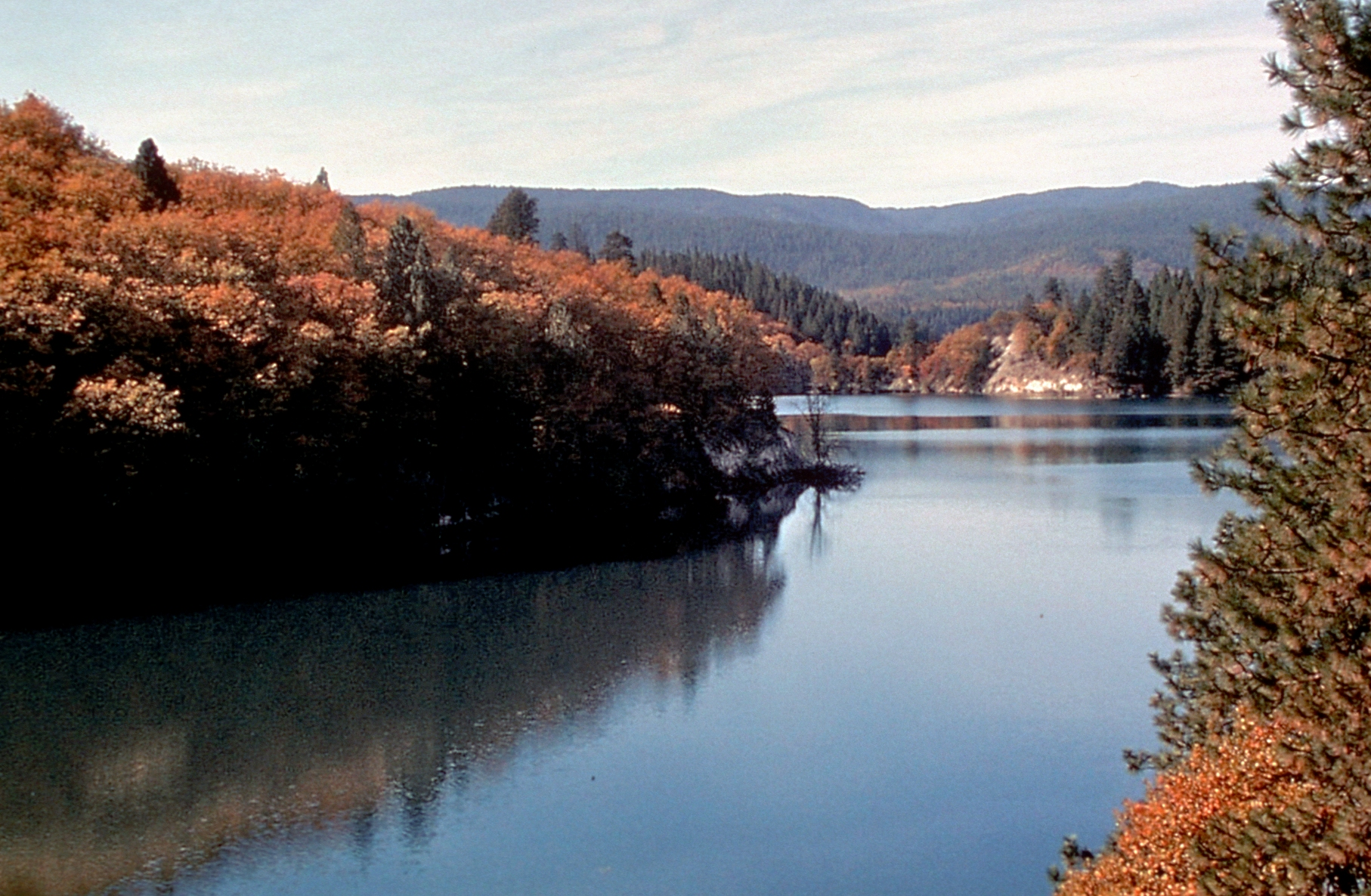

- Location within California Location within the United States
- Location: Shasta County, California
- Coordinates: 41.0218°N 121.6753°W
- Type: Reservoir
- Primary inflows: Pit River
- Primary outflows: Pit River
- Catchment area: 4,700 square miles (12,000 km^{2})
- Basin countries: United States
- Water volume: 34,600 acre-feet (42,700,000 m^{3})
- Surface elevation: 2,717 feet (828 m)

Lake Britton is a reservoir located in Shasta County, California. It is known for its wide variety of bass and trout. Its main body is situated to the west of State Route 89, and is mostly surrounded by PG&E Land, Forest Service Land, and McArthur-Burney Falls Memorial State Park. Along the north shore lies North Shore and Dusty Campgrounds. It is fed by the Pit River and has tributaries of Clark Creek, Burney Creek, and Hat Creek and is impounded by the Pit #3 Dam.

A bridge, owned by the Great Shasta Rail Trail, which spans Lake Britton (just east of Hwy 89) was used for the railroad bridge scene in the 1986 film Stand By Me.

== See also ==
- List of lakes in California
