= Pit River =

River in California, United States

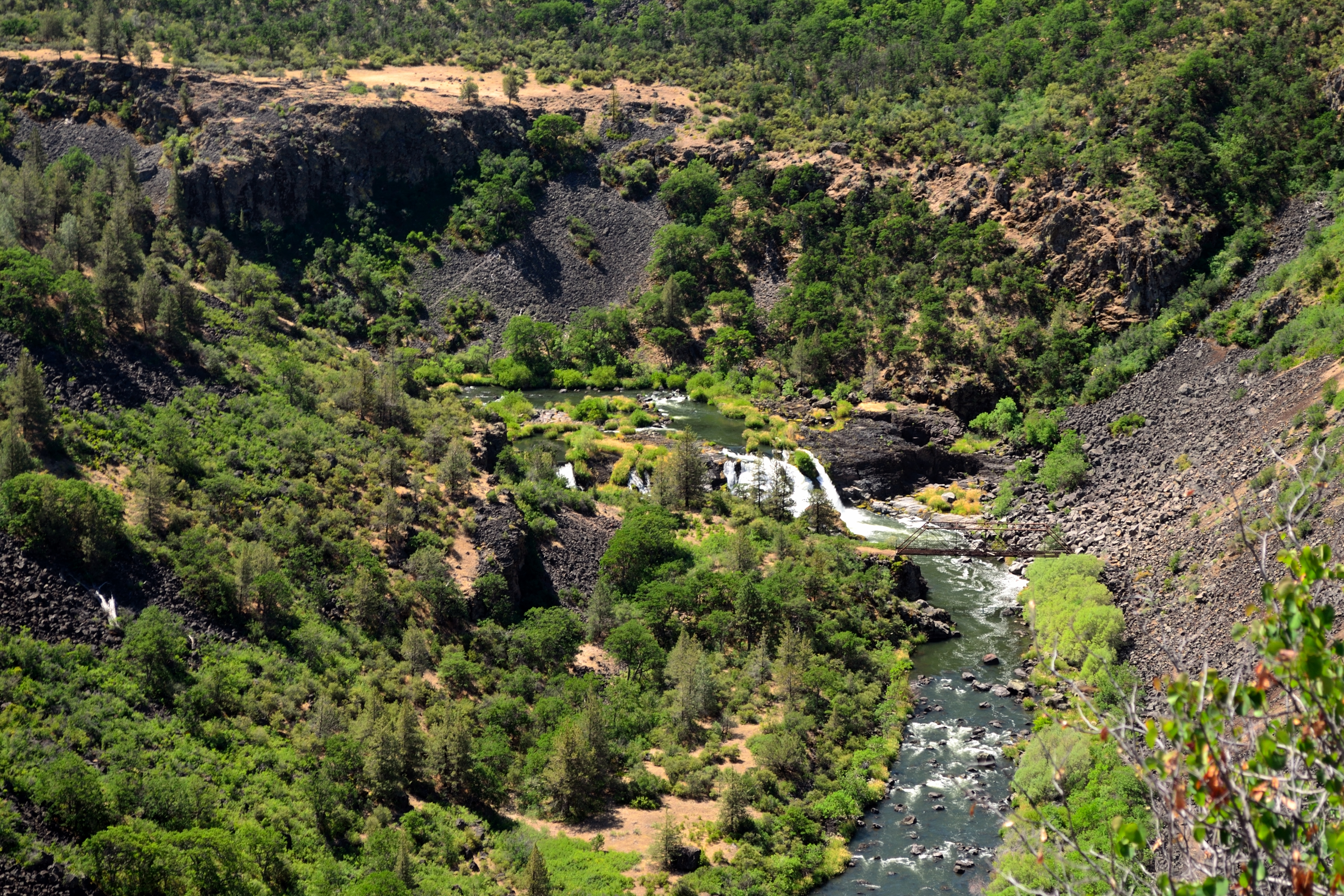
- Waterfalls on the Pit River near Fall River Mills

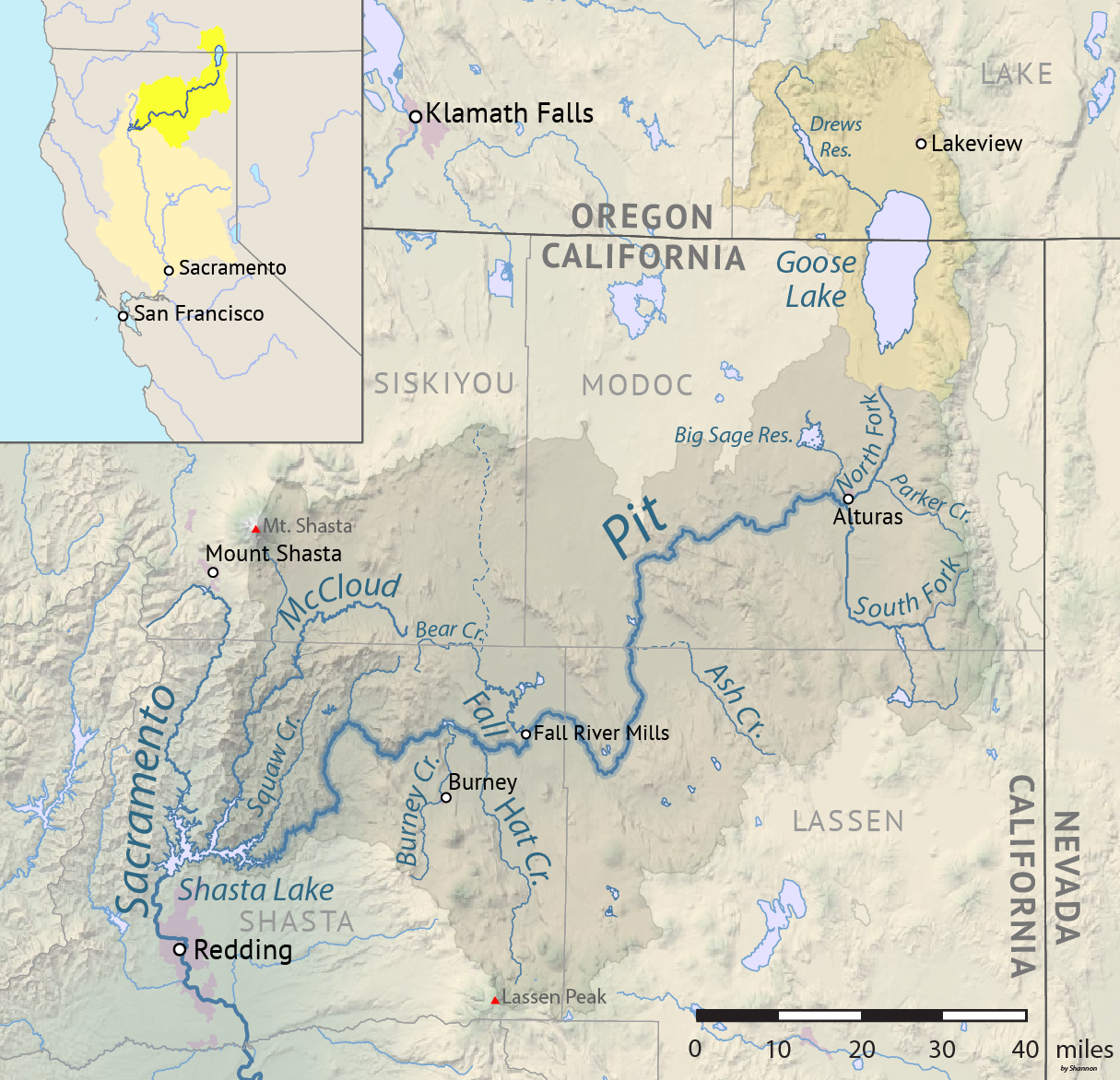
- Map of the Pit River drainage basin, with the historically connected Goose Lake drainage basin indicated in orange.
- Etymology: Achomawi pitfall traps

Location
- Country: United States
- State: California
- District: Modoc, Lassen, & Shasta counties

Physical characteristics
- Source: Confluence of North and South Forks
  - location: Near Alturas, Modoc County
  - coordinates: 41°28′23″N 120°33′28″W
  - elevation: 4,350 ft (1,330 m)
- Mouth: Sacramento River
  - location: Shasta Lake, Shasta County
  - coordinates: 40°45′23″N 122°22′14″W
  - elevation: 1,066 ft (325 m)
- Length: 207 mi (333 km)
- Basin size: 7,064 sq mi (18,300 km^{2})
- Discharge
  - location: Montgomery Creek, above Shasta Lake
  - average: 4,786 cu ft/s (135.5 m^{3}/s)
  - minimum: 30 cu ft/s (0.85 m^{3}/s)
  - maximum: 73,000 cu ft/s (2,100 m^{3}/s)

Basin features
- Tributaries
  - left: Ash Creek
  - right: Sulanharas Creek, McCloud River

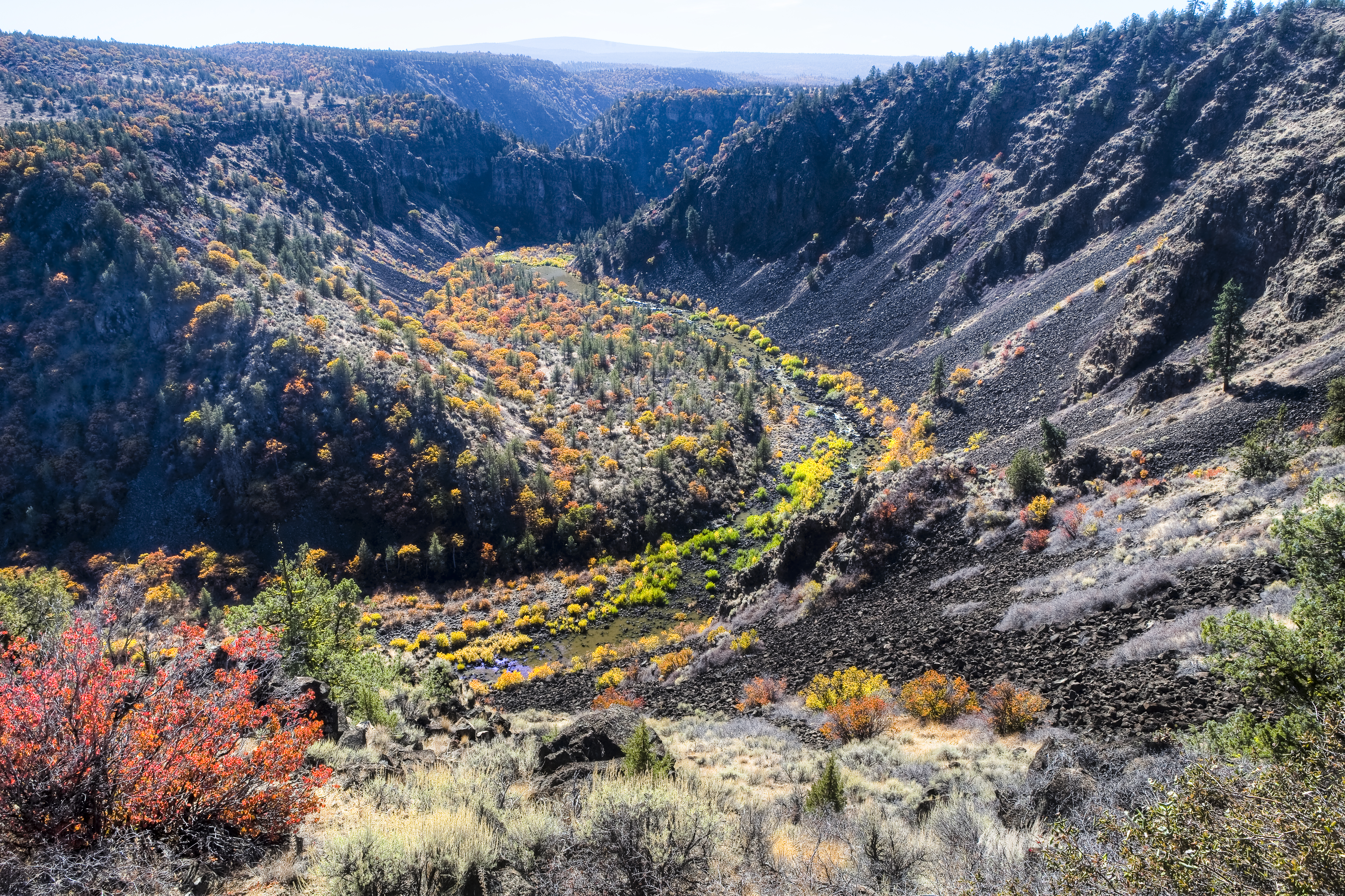
Pit River Canyon Wilderness Study Area

The Pit River is a major river draining from northeastern California into the state's Central Valley. The Pit, the Klamath and the Columbia are the only three rivers in the U.S. that cross the Cascade Range.

The longest tributary of the Sacramento River, it contributes as much as eighty percent of their combined water volume into the Shasta Lake reservoir; the junction of their Shasta Lake arms is 4 miles (6.4 km) northeast of Shasta Dam. The main stem of the Pit River is 207 miles (333 km) long, and some water in the system flows 265 miles (426 km) to the Sacramento River measuring from the Pit River's longest source.

The Pit River drains a sparsely populated volcanic highlands area in Modoc County's Warner Mountains, passing through the south end of the Cascade Range in a deep canyon northeast of Redding. The river is so named because of the semi-subterranean permanent winter homes and large 'sweat houses' that the Pit River Tribe dug, and their pit traps for game that came to water at the river.

The river is a popular destination for fishing, fly fishing, and rafting in its lower reaches, and is used to generate hydroelectricity in the powerhouses below Fall River Mills where the Pit and Fall rivers join, and at Shasta Dam. It is also used extensively for irrigation and conservation purposes.

== Course ==
The Pit River rises in several forks in Modoc, Lassen and Shasta counties in the northeastern corner of California. The 58-mile (93 km) South Fork Pit River - West Valley Creek - Cedar Creek source originates just southeast of Buck Mountain in the Warner Mountains, in the extreme southeastern corner of the Modoc National Forest 9 miles (14 km) west of the California–Nevada border. The South Fork is formed from the confluence of several creeks in Jess Valley 13 miles (21 km) northeast of Madeline and flows west through a narrow canyon, past Likely, then generally north through a broad ranching valley where its waters are diverted for irrigation and waterfowl conservation via an extensive system of canals.

The 30-mile (48 km) long North Fork - Linnville Creek tributary begins 5 miles (8.0 km) southeast of the town of Davis Creek, near Goose Lake. It flows generally south-southwest, joining the South Fork from the north near Alturas. Although Goose Lake is generally considered the terminal sink of an endorheic basin, it will overflow into the Pit River during floods; however this has not occurred since 1881 due to large diversions of water for agriculture.

The combined river flows west-southwest in a winding course across Modoc County, past Canby and through the Modoc National Forest in the narrow Stonecoal Valley Gorge. It turns south to flow past Lookout and into northern Lassen County, past Bieber, to emerge into the ranching region of Big Valley. North of Little Valley it flows into northeast Shasta County and the Shasta National Forest. Then the river reaches Fall River Valley, where it is joined by the Fall River, which is fed by one of the largest freshwater spring systems in the United States. After passing through the town of Fall River Mills, the river drops over Pit River Falls, then enters the head of a long serpentine canyon that cuts through the southern Cascade Range. It then turns south to join the Sacramento River as the eastern arm of Shasta Lake reservoir, approximately 15 miles (24 km) north of Redding. Potem Creek joins the river at Potem Falls. Two major tributaries, Sulanharas Creek and the McCloud River, join the Pit from the north within the lake. The lower 30 miles (48 km) of the river forms the longest of the five arms of Shasta Lake, which is formed by Shasta Dam on the Sacramento downstream from the original confluence.

== Hydrology ==
Fed by significant volcanic groundwater basins that produce some of the largest contiguous freshwater spring systems in the United States, the middle and lower reaches of the Pit River exhibit a strong year-round flow, in contrast to the highly seasonal nature of most northern California rivers. Before Shasta Dam was built, the Pit contributed as much as 85 percent of the Sacramento River's dry-season flow as measured at Red Bluff, nearly 100 miles (160 km) downstream of their confluence – making the river an important resource for irrigation, and later, hydroelectricity. The upper reaches of the Pit above Fall River Mills are a snow-fed high desert stream with a much more seasonal hydrograph. The lowermost part (Shasta Lake portion) of the Pit River system receives heavy winter rainfall, which mainly contributes to streamflow between November and April. Nevertheless, summer low water flows rarely drop below 2,000 cu ft/s (57 m^{3}/s).

While conducting surveys for irrigation projects in the early 1900s, the U.S. Reclamation Service (now Bureau of Reclamation) noted that the spring-fed Fall River alone contributed a year-round flow of about 1,500 cubic feet per second (42 m^{3}/s), from an aquifer fed in part by Mount Shasta snowmelt. Much of this water rises at what is often called "Thousand Springs" a few miles above Fall River Mills, west of Ahjumawi Lava Springs State Park. Hat Creek and Burney Creek, spring-fed from the Lassen Peak area, supplied a further 900 cubic feet per second (25 m^{3}/s) to the Pit River. The aquifers in the Pit River basin may hold as much as 16 million acre-feet (20 km^{3}) in storage and are consistently replenished by winter precipitation seeping through the watershed's porous volcanic rocks and soils. The water typically emerges at points of lower elevation where the surface layers encounter harder metamorphic and sedimentary rock.

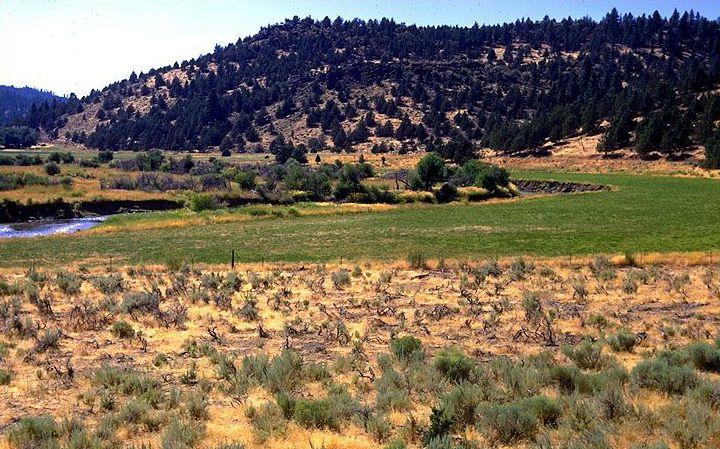
The Pit River before it enters the canyons west of Canby, Modoc County

The U.S. Geological Survey (USGS) operates a stream gage on the Pit River at Montgomery Creek, directly below Pit 7 Dam and above Shasta Lake. This gage measures streamflow from an area of 4,952 square miles (12,830 km^{2}), or 70 percent of the total watershed. The average streamflow between 1966 and 2012 was 4,786 cu ft/s (135.5 m^{3}/s), with a maximum of 73,000 cu ft/s (2,100 m^{3}/s) recorded on January 24, 1970, after heavy rainfall. A short minimum flow of 30 cu ft/s (0.85 m^{3}/s) occurred on July 12, 1975, due to construction work at Pit 7 Powerhouse requiring temporary cessation of releases. The minimum 7-day flow was 989 cubic feet per second (28.0 m^{3}/s), on September 5–12, 1966.

Before the damming of Shasta Lake in the 1940s, the annual flow of the Pit River was about four times the size of the Sacramento at their confluence, making it the true hydrological source of the Sacramento River system. Measured at the mouth, the river's natural discharge likely exceeded 6,000 cubic feet per second (170 m^{3}/s), a figure which includes the McCloud River and Sulanharas Creek contributing about 1,010 cubic feet per second (29 m^{3}/s) of additional flow below the Montgomery Creek gage.

== Dams ==
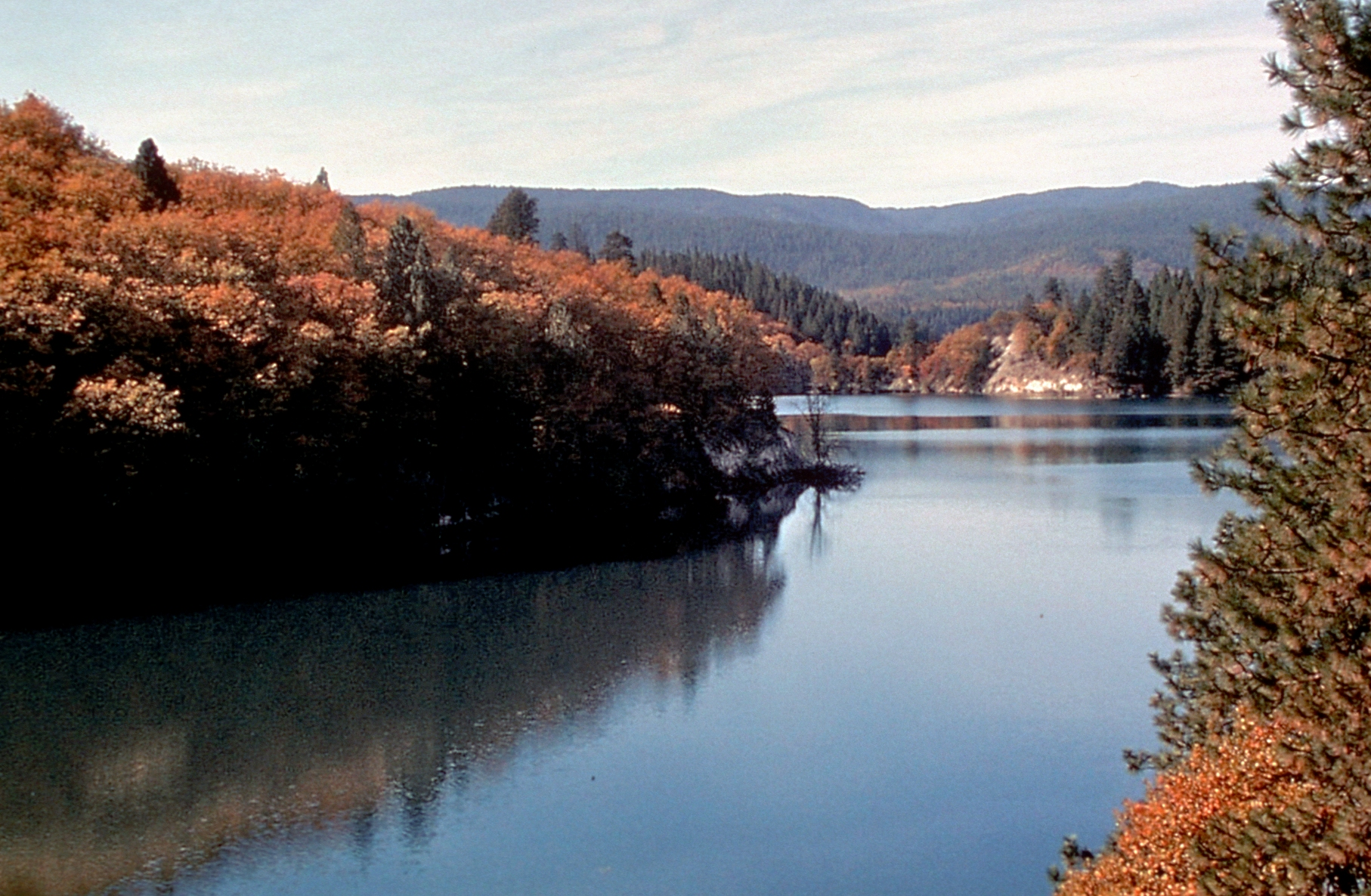
Pit River impounded in Lake Britton, its second [Shasta is largest] largest reservoir

The lower course of the Pit River is one of California's most significant hydroelectric rivers, not just because of its consistent perennial flow, but because of its steep drop: in the 50 miles (80 km) between Fall River Mills and Shasta Lake, the Pit descends some 2,200 feet (670 m), or a gradient of 44 ft (13 m) per mile, which is quite considerable for a river of its size. Because of the dependable flow, large reservoirs are not needed to regulate releases for power generation, unlike other major hydroelectric schemes in California. The combined generating capacity of powerhouses on the river and its tributaries is approximately 770 megawatts. (Note: Combination of Pit 1, 3, 4 and 5, McCloud-Pit and Hat Creek hydroelectric projects.) As of 2004, the annual generation from main stem powerhouses is approximately 2.64 billion KWh. Including powerhouses on tributaries, the total rises to 3.67 billion KWh, or approximately 13 percent of California's total hydropower.

The first dam on the Pit River proper is Pit 3 Dam, which forms Lake Britton near Burney about 15 miles (24 km) downstream from Fall River Mills. Water is diverted via a 16,000-foot (4,900 m) tunnel to Pit 3 Powerhouse, located on the upper end of Pit 4 Reservoir, formed by Pit 4 Dam. Pit 4 is a much smaller diversion dam, drawing water through a tunnel under Chalk Mountain to Pit 4 Powerhouse on Pit 5 Reservoir. Like Pit 4, Pit 5 is also a small diversion dam with minimal pondage. From here, the water is diverted to an offstream regulating reservoir (Tunnel Reservoir) and then through a tunnel bypassing the Pit River reach known as the "Big Bend" and the eponymous town of Big Bend, to feed Pit 5 Powerhouse. These dams and powerhouses are licensed under the Federal Energy Regulatory Commission as the "Pit 3, 4, and 5 Project", and are operated by Pacific Gas and Electric Company (PG&E)

Below Pit 5 Powerhouse lie two larger concrete arch-gravity dams, Pit 6 and Pit 7. These dams release water directly from the base to generate power, rather than diverting the water through long tunnels. The combined reservoirs flood almost 10 miles (16 km) of the Pit River. Flows for these two dams are supplemented by a diversion from the McCloud River, a tributary of the Pit River. Water is diverted from the McCloud River at Lake McCloud about 20 miles (32 km) south of Mount Shasta, through a tunnel to Iron Canyon Reservoir, and then through another tunnel to the James B. Black Powerhouse, which outlets into the Pit River on the upper end of Pit 6 Reservoir. These facilities are collectively known as the McCloud-Pit Hydroelectric Project and are also operated by PG&E.

The lowermost 30 miles (48 km) of the Pit River are flooded by Shasta Lake, which is formed by Shasta Dam on the Sacramento River about 3 miles (4.8 km) below what was formerly the confluence of the Pit and Sacramento Rivers. Completed in 1945, Shasta is a key component of the U.S. Bureau of Reclamation's Central Valley Project, a primary source of irrigation water in the Central Valley. The lake also floods parts of two Pit River tributaries, the McCloud River and Sulanharas Creek.

There are also multiple hydroelectric schemes on the Pit River's tributaries, such as the Fall River and Hat Creek. The Hat Creek Hydroelectric Project, which consists of two powerhouses on lower Hat Creek built in the early 1920s by Red River Lumber Co., is considered eligible for listing on the National Register of Historic Places. The Hat Creek facilities were purchased by PG&E in 1945.

Before environmental regulations enacted in the late 20th and early 21st century, diversions took up to 95 percent of Pit River summer flows, resulting in the dewatering of significant stretches between Fall River Mills and Big Bend. PG&E is now required to maintain base flow in the river at all times, which has led to a reduction in hydroelectric power generation but has greatly improved wildlife habitat and fishing on these sections of the Pit.

== History ==
=== Native Americans ===
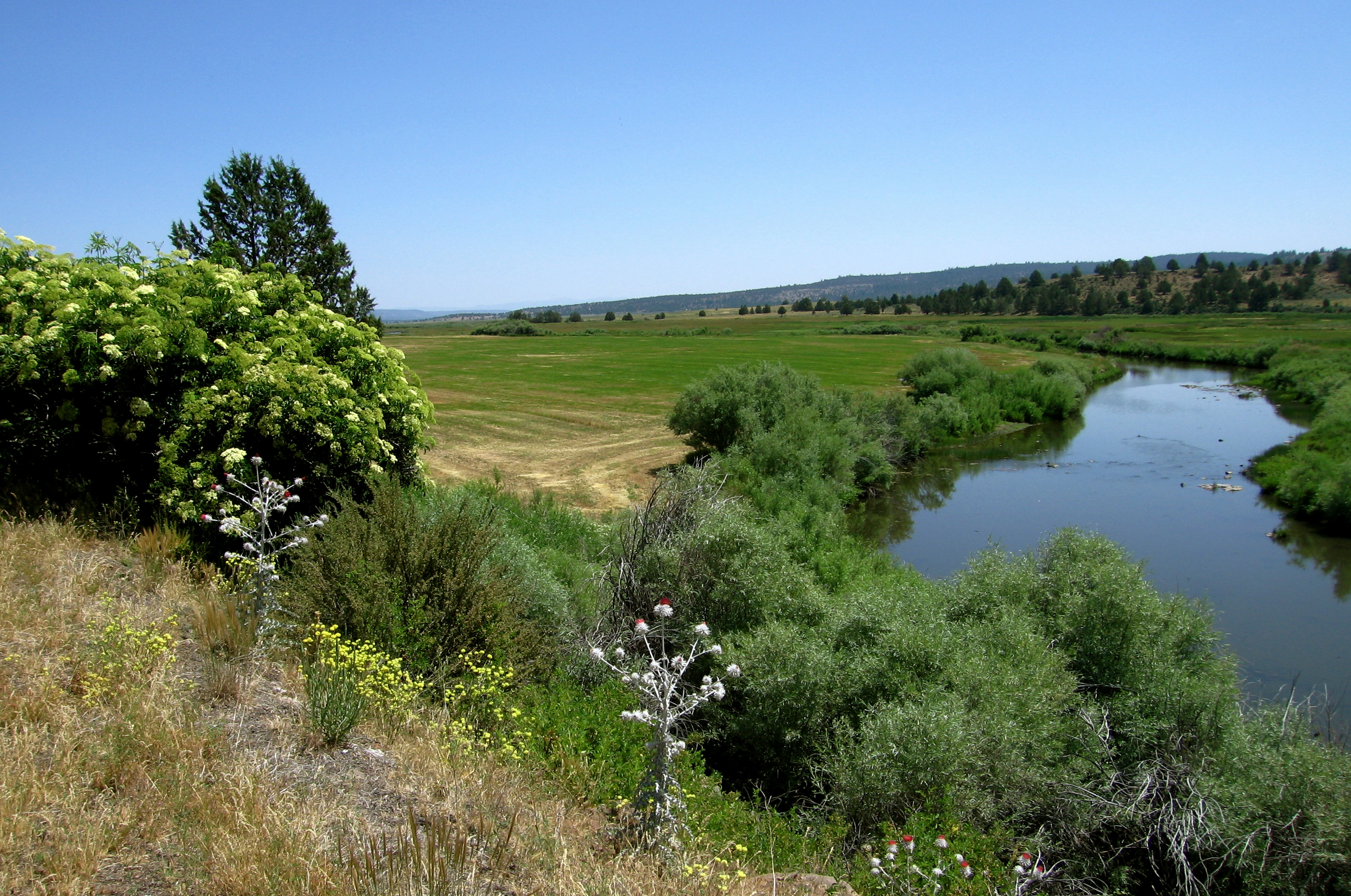
Upper Pit River near Alturas

The Pit River is located in historical Achomawi territory, who lived in the area expanding from Big Bend to Goose Lake. Human habitation in this region may date back as far as 12,500 years. The Achomawi (consisting of nine distinct bands) had up to 28 villages in the Pit River area and are considered Palaihnihan speakers, along with the neighboring Atsugewi people who lived along southern tributaries of the Pit such as Burney and Hat Creeks, and the Dixie Valley. Because of the sparse resources of the Pit River's high desert watershed, most natives lived close to the river and subsisted primarily by hunting and fishing. Achomawi moved between hunting camps in summer, consisting of cone-shaped tents covered with tule, and larger wood-frame pit houses in winter. The Pit River is named for the pitfall traps the Achomawi dug to capture game that drank at the river. The name Achomawi derives from a Palaihnihan word meaning "people of the river".

Achomawi territory was bordered by that of the Klamath and Modoc to the north, the Shasta to the northwest, the Wintun on the west (in the lower Pit and McCloud River valleys), the Yana on the southwest, Maidu to the south, and Paiute to the east. Most of the local tribes have had social and border disputes since ancient times; the Achomawi and Atsugewi were historically subject to raids by the Klamath and the Modoc who would take prisoners to sell as slaves at The Dalles, Oregon – then a major Native American trading hub on the Columbia River, more than 300 miles (480 km) to the north.

In the early 1800s, armed with horses and firearms obtained by trading with Europeans, the Paiute launched a full-scale attack on the Achomawi, with one raid killing between 200 and 300 people in a camp near modern Fall River Mills. Following this, the Achomawi and other western tribes formed a temporary confederation against the Paiute. After successfully driving off a Paiute attack the next year, a peace treaty was signed. However, in the 1850s tensions grew between the Achomawi and the Modoc, leading to armed conflicts that continued for over twenty years. Despite multiple attempts by leaders on both sides to make peace, "each time the truce was soon broken by irresponsible young fellows whom the chiefs could not control."

=== Conflict with Europeans ===
Native peoples also grew hostile towards Euro-American settlers and traders, who entered the region in great numbers beginning in the mid-19th century, especially during and after the California Gold Rush in 1848. There was little conflict at first with outsiders who were just passing through the area on their way to the Sacramento Valley. However, after white Americans settled near Fall River, conflict broke out. After initial skirmishes, soldiers led by US general George Crook arrived in the area. The natives negotiated a temporary truce with Crook, in the form of a gift of a large number of furs. This was broken the next year, when two settlers were killed by Atsugewi for an unknown reason. In retaliation, a band of white men attacked a native camp at Beaver Creek (near present-day Pittville) killing 160 people, mostly women and children.

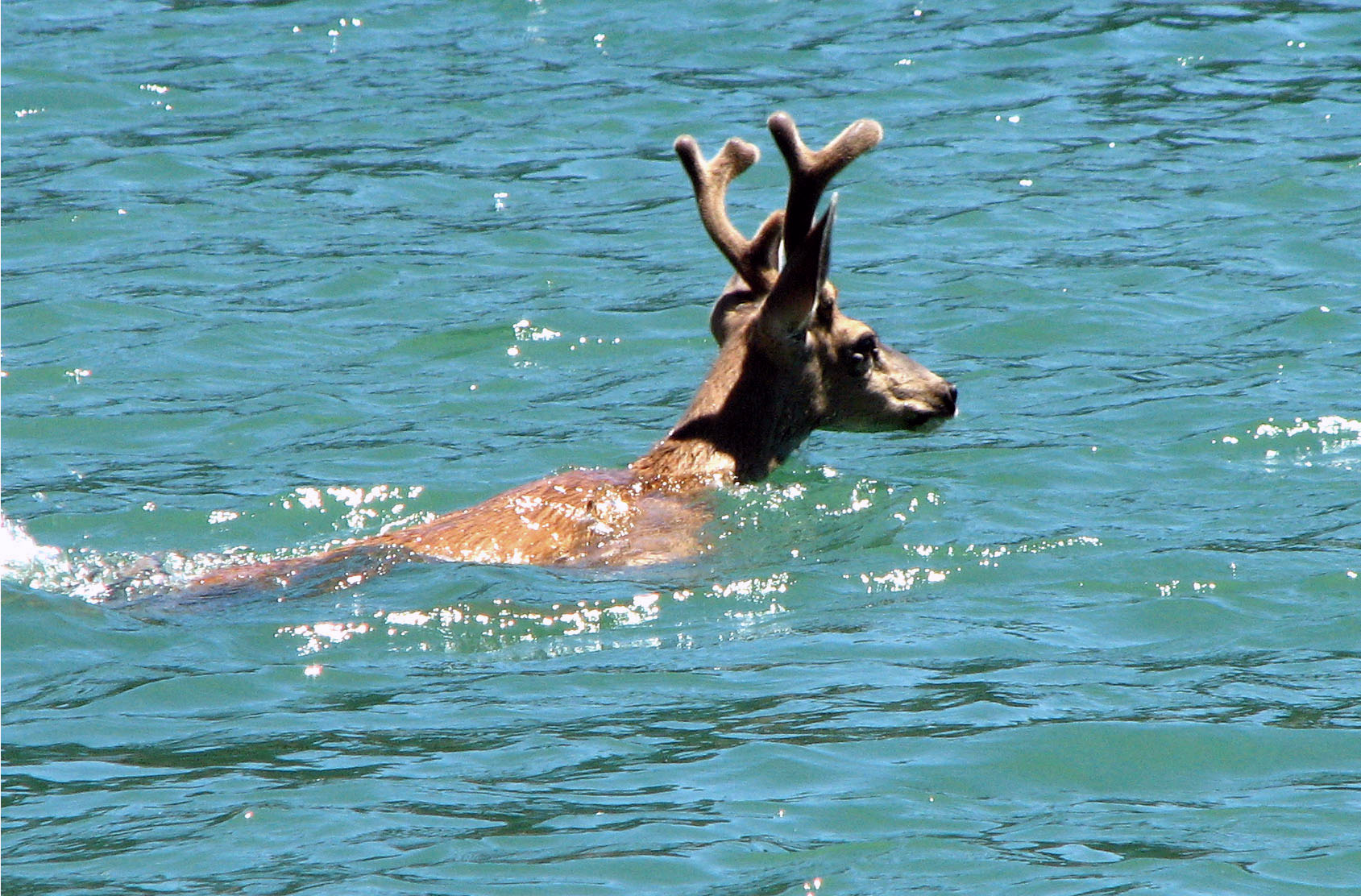
Deer swimming in Shasta Lake

The military Pitt River Expeditions against local Indian Tribes occurred during the 1850s. The first expedition in 1850 was mainly an attempt to establish better relations with the indigenous peoples. The second, led by General Crook in 1857, was a military engagement, as the US government decided to forcibly remove the Pit River natives and move them to the Mendocino Indian Reservation (then later the Round Valley Indian Reservation) in Mendocino County. The former enemies of the Achomawi – the Modocs and Klamaths – were also driven out of the region by 1873 with the conclusion of the Modoc War. This is considered to be the point at which the Pit River valley was opened up to large-scale White settlement.

=== Irrigation and power ===
Due to the arid climate, poor soils and rugged topography of the Pit River basin and northeastern California in general, settlement and development of the region was difficult. Ranching became the primary economic activity, thanks to the expansive seasonal grasslands, along with some mining and logging. Although the lower portions of the Pit River contain abundant water, the western watershed is too mountainous for agriculture. On the other hand, the drier eastern part of the watershed contains a number of flat river valleys with deep alluvial soils. Throughout the early part of the 20th century, about 63 reservoirs were built on tributary streams in this region, to support irrigation. Due to limited and uncertain streamflow from these snowfed desert streams, the amount of farmland in the Pit River system remained small, and water rights were a contentious issue. Some of these disputes were resolved in court in the 1930s, with water allocations now managed by the California Department of Water Resources.

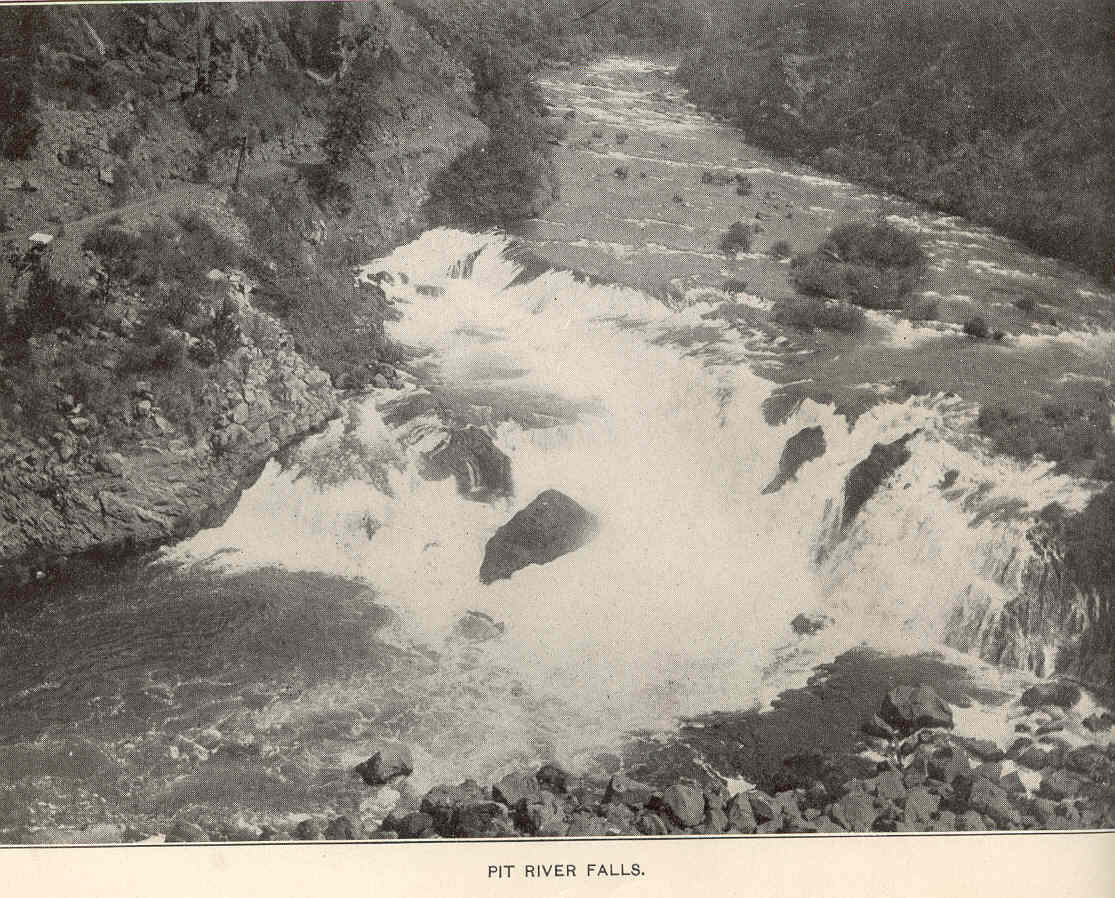
Pit River Falls, photographed by Cloudsley Rutter, c. 1904

In the early 1900s and 1910s the Pit River was identified by the recently formed Reclamation Service (now Bureau of Reclamation) as the most important water source in the upper Sacramento River system; the river provides not only the majority of the annual flow, but nearly the entire dependable summer water supply. One of the first proposals to dam the Pit River was in 1915 and was known as the "Lower Pit River Project". A 139-foot (42 m) dam would have been built across the river at Sheep Rocks, above the confluence with Sulanharas Creek. About one-quarter of the river's flow would be diverted to irrigate some 60,000 acres (24,000 ha) of fertile benchland in the upper Sacramento Valley, east of Redding. The Lower Pit River Project was technically superseded by the Central Valley Project for which Shasta Dam was completed in 1945. Shasta Lake raised the level of the Pit River more than 100 feet (30 m) above the elevation of the proposed Sheep Rocks dam. It also flooded the majority of the Wintun peoples' traditional lands along the Pit and McCloud rivers, still controversial today.

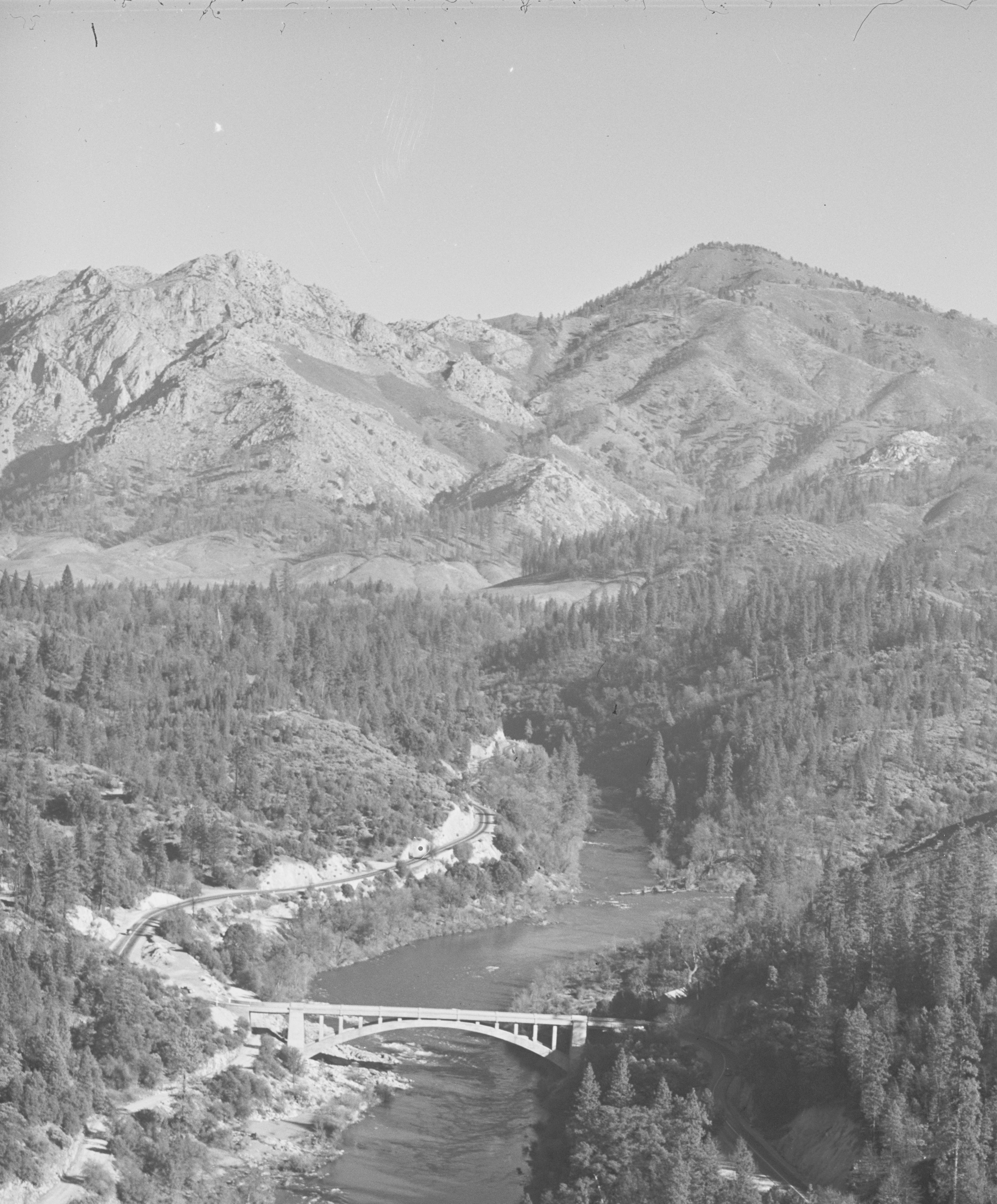
Confluence of the Sacramento (left) and Pit (right) rivers in 1941, before completion of Shasta Dam

Hydroelectric development of the Pit River system also began early. One of the first major hydroelectric projects was the Hat Creek project, built in 1920 and generating the first power in 1921. The Fall River was developed soon afterwards with a powerhouse coming online by 1922. Pit 3 Dam (Lake Britton) was completed in 1925 and its powerhouse began operation on July 18, 1925. Pit 4 and 5, located further downstream, were completed between the mid-1940s and mid-1950s. The lower Pit River was dammed in the 1960s, forming Reservoirs 6 and 7. A diversion from the McCloud River was also completed during this time to increase water flowing through powerhouses on the Pit River. Pit 2 Powerhouse was planned but never built: due to an error in the topographic maps, the elevation drop between Fall River and Lake Britton, where the powerhouse was to have been situated, was too small for economical power generation.

== Recreation ==
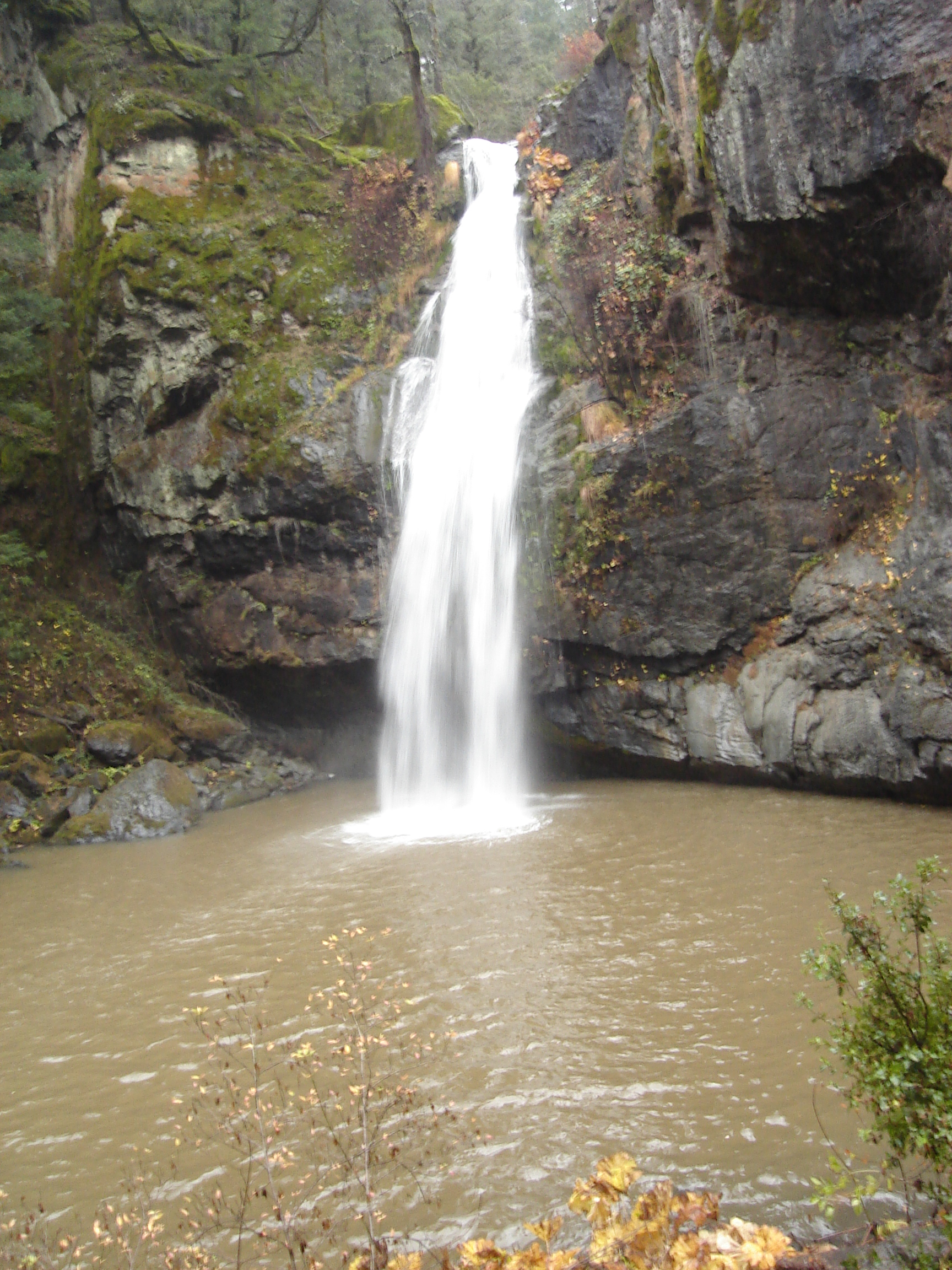
Potem Falls

The Pit River is a well-known trout stream in northern California and is a popular destination for fishing. The river is notorious for its swift, deep water, slippery bed and low visibility, and is considered difficult and dangerous to wade. Flows are fairly consistent year-round, except after storm events, both due to the natural springs feeding the river and regulation by many hydroelectric dams. Fishing has improved since the 2011 relicensing of several PG&E hydroelectric facilities on the river, which required the power company to increase minimum flows on the formerly dewatered river reaches below Dams 3, 4 and 5, and to monitor the health of fish populations in these reaches. The lower Pit is considered a Blue Ribbon fishery.

The river is also a well-known hiking and sightseeing spot, particularly for people looking for waterfalls and bald eagles. Among the most picturesque spots are Potem Falls.

== See also ==
- Pit River topics
- Tributaries of the Sacramento River
- List of rivers of California

== Works cited ==
- Palmer, Tim (2012). Field Guide to California Rivers. California Natural History Guides. University of California Press. ISBN 978-0-52095-219-5.
- Secrest, William B (2003). When the Great Spirit Died: the Destruction of the California Indians, 1850-1860.
- Stewart, Jonathan (2010). Pilgrimage To The Edge. Xlibris Corporation. ISBN 978-1-45680-000-0.
- Waldman, Carl (September 2006). Encyclopedia of Native American tribes. Infobase Publishing. ISBN 978-0-8160-6274-4.
