= Stand by Me (film) =

1986 American coming-of-age film directed by Rob Reiner

- Theatrical release poster
- Directed by: Rob Reiner
- Screenplay by: Raynold Gideon; Bruce A. Evans
- Based on: The Body; 1982 novella by Stephen King
- Produced by: Andrew Scheinman; Bruce A. Evans; Raynold Gideon
- Starring: Wil Wheaton; River Phoenix; Corey Feldman; Jerry O'Connell; Kiefer Sutherland
- Cinematography: Thomas Del Ruth
- Edited by: Robert Leighton
- Music by: Jack Nitzsche
- Production company: Act III Productions
- Distributed by: Columbia Pictures
- Release date: August 22, 1986 (United States)
- Running time: 89 minutes
- Country: United States
- Language: English
- Budget: $7.5–8 million
- Box office: $54.3 million

Stand by Me is a 1986 American coming-of-age drama film directed by Rob Reiner. Based on Stephen King's 1982 novella The Body, the film is set in the fictional town of Castle Rock, Oregon, in 1959. Stand by Me stars Wil Wheaton, River Phoenix, Corey Feldman, and Jerry O'Connell as four boys who set out on a journey to find the dead body of a missing boy. The film's title is derived from the 1961 song of the same name by Ben E. King, which plays during the film's closing credits.

Released in the United States on August 22, 1986, by Columbia Pictures, Stand by Me received positive reviews and was a commercial success. The film was nominated for an Academy Award for Best Adapted Screenplay and for two Golden Globe Awards (Best Drama Motion Picture and Best Director). Rolling Stone has called Stand by Me "a staple of youthful nostalgia" and "the rare movie that necessarily gets better with time". The film was re-released in theaters on March 27, 2026 to commemorate its 40th anniversary.

== Plot ==
In 1985, writer Gordon "Gordie" Lachance reads in the newspaper that attorney Chris Chambers—his childhood best friend—was murdered. In an extended flashback, Gordie recounts his experiences at age 12 on Labor Day weekend in 1959.

In Castle Rock, Oregon, Vern Tessio tells his friends Gordie LaChance, Chris Chambers, and Teddy Duchamp that he overheard his older brother, Billy, and his friend Charlie discussing Ray Brower, a missing boy from a neighboring town. Billy and his friend found Ray's body in a wooded area near train tracks, but they are unable to notify police without making it known that they had stolen a car.

Gordie, Chris, Teddy, and Vern decide to find the body, believing it will make them local heroes. The boys tell their families that they plan to camp out together. Before meeting up with Vern and Teddy, Chris shows Gordie a Colt .45 semi-automatic pistol stolen from his father. The two then run into the town bully, John "Ace" Merrill, and Chris' older brother, Richard "Eyeball" Chambers. Ace harasses Chris and steals a Yankees baseball cap that Gordie's recently deceased older brother, Denny, gave him.

The boys trespass through Milo Pressman's yard. They barely outrun Chopper the guard dog, who is far less fearsome than his reputation would suggest. An angry Milo insults Teddy's father, a mentally ill war veteran. Enraged, Teddy tries to attack Milo. The other boys restrain him, and they continue on their journey. Chris encourages Gordie to fulfill his potential as a writer despite his neglectful father's disapproval. Later, Gordie and Vern barely avoid being hit by a train while crossing a railroad bridge.

That night, Gordie entertains the boys with a fictional story about a character named David "Lard-Ass" Hogan, a constantly bullied obese boy. Seeking payback, Lard-Ass drinks a bottle of castor oil before entering a pie-eating contest. During the event, Lard-Ass deliberately throws up, inducing mass vomiting among the other contestants and spectators. Gordie calls the event a "barf-o-rama".

Chris later tells Gordie that he hates being defined by his family's bad reputation. He admits to stealing the school's milk money fund. However, when he returned the money out of guilt, he was still suspended after the teacher he gave it back to secretly pocketed the money. Devastated by the betrayal, Chris breaks down crying.

The next day, Gordie, Chris, Vern, and Teddy take a shortcut across a pond, getting covered in leeches. They frantically pull them off, but Gordie faints after removing one from his genitals. Soon after, they locate Ray Brower's body just off the train tracks where he was struck. The discovery traumatizes Gordie, who tearfully questions why his brother had to die and says his father hates him. Chris comforts him, saying his father simply does not know him.

Ace and his gang arrive to claim Ray's body and demand the boys leave. When Chris refuses, Ace draws a switchblade and threatens him. Gordie fetches the gun and comes to Chris's defence. He fires a warning shot into the air before aiming the gun at Ace, claiming he will shoot him. Ace and his gang are forced to back off and leave, though Ace vows revenge. The boys agree that seeking recognition for finding Ray's body would be wrong and decide to report it anonymously instead. They arrive back in town the next morning, and each of them heads home.

Back in 1985, Gordie is finishing his memoir about that weekend. He notes that Vern and Teddy drifted apart from him and Chris in junior high. Chris took pre-college courses and attended law school, and Gordie became a professional writer. While attempting to defuse a fight in a fast-food restaurant, Chris was fatally stabbed in the neck. Gordie writes that despite not having seen Chris in over a decade, he will miss him forever. He ends the narrative with the following: "I never had any friends later on like the ones I had when I was twelve. Jesus, does anyone?"

== Cast ==
- Wil Wheaton as Gordie Lachance
- River Phoenix as Chris Chambers
- Corey Feldman as Teddy Duchamp
- Jerry O'Connell as Vern Tessio
- Kiefer Sutherland as Ace Merrill (gang leader)
- Casey Siemaszko as Billy Tessio (gang member and Vern's older brother)
- Gary Riley as Charlie Hogan (gang member and Billy's best friend)
- Bradley Gregg as Richard "Eyeball" Chambers (gang member and Chris's older brother)
- Jason Oliver as Vince Desjardins (gang member)
- Marshall Bell as Mr. Lachance
- Frances Lee McCain as Mrs. Lachance
- Bruce Kirby as Mr. Quidacioluo (store owner)
- William Bronder as Milo Pressman (junkyard owner)
- Scott Beach as Mayor Grundy
- Richard Dreyfuss as The Writer (adult Gordie)
- John Cusack as Denny Lachance (Gordie's older brother)
- Madeline Swift as Waitress
- Popeye as Chopper
- Art Burke as Principal John Wiggins
- Matt Williams as Bob Cormier
- Andy Lindberg as David "Lard-Ass" Hogan
- Dick Durock as Bill Travis

== Production ==
=== Development ===
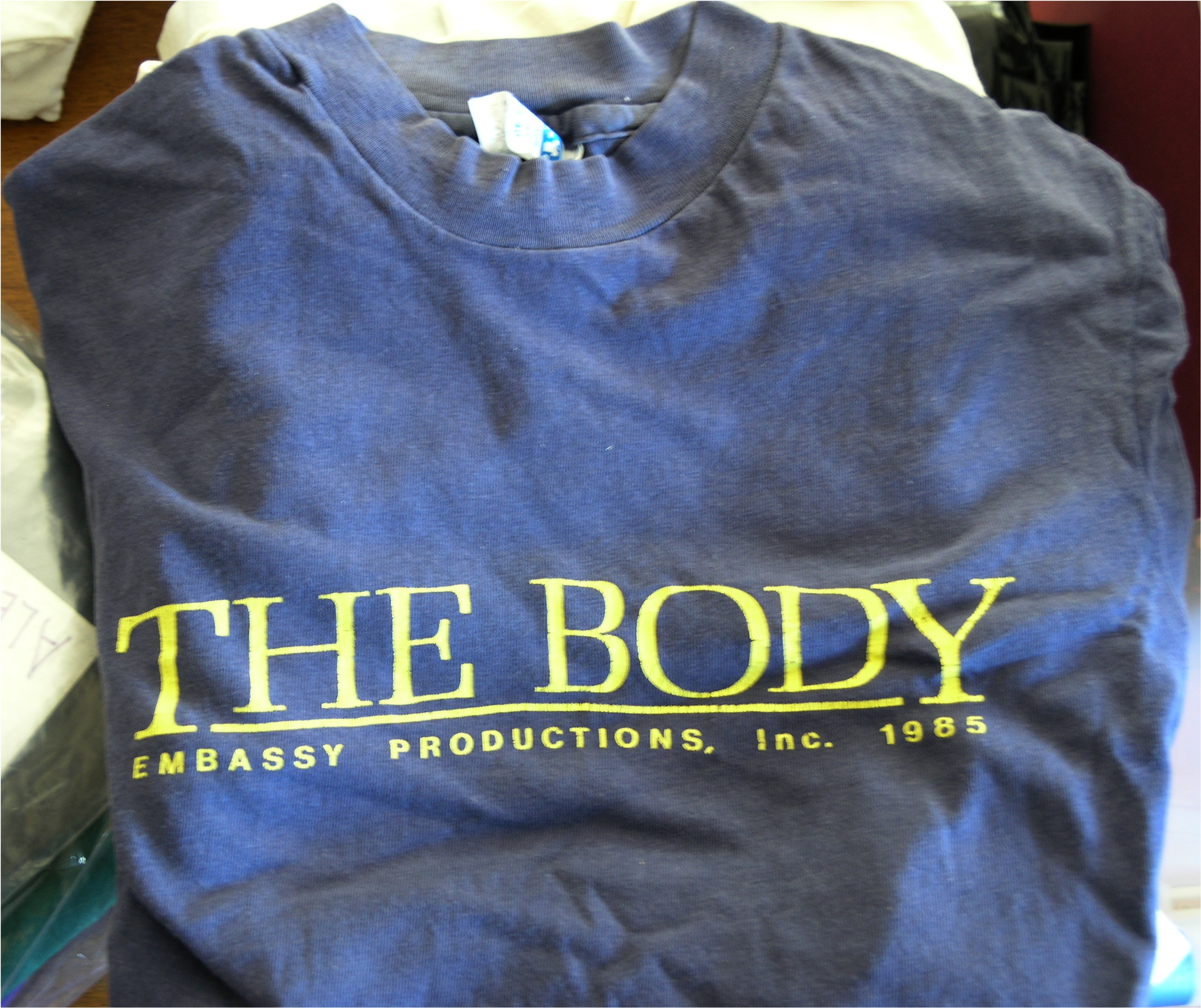
"The Body" was the original name of the movie based on the novel, with Embassy Pictures heading production. T-shirts bearing the name and company were given to the cast and crew.

Stand By Me was adapted from the Stephen King novella The Body. Bruce A. Evans sent a copy of The Body to Karen Gideon, the wife of his friend and writing partner Raynold Gideon, on August 29, 1983, as a gift for her birthday. Both Gideon and Evans quickly became fans of the novella and shortly thereafter contacted King's agent, Kirby McCauley, seeking to negotiate film rights; McCauley replied that King's terms were $100,000 and 10% of the gross profits. Although the money was not an issue, the share of gross profits was considered excessive, especially considering that no stars could be featured to help sell the movie. In response, Evans and Gideon pursued an established director, Adrian Lyne, to help sell the project.

After reading the novella, Lyne teamed up with Evans and Gideon, but all the studios the trio approached turned the project down except for Martin Shafer at Embassy Pictures. Embassy spent four months negotiating the rights with McCauley, settling on $50,000 and a smaller share of the profits, and Evans and Gideon spent eight weeks writing the screenplay. Evans and Gideon asked to also produce the film, but Shafer suggested they team up with Andrew Scheinman, a more experienced producer. Embassy was unwilling to meet Lyne's salary for directing the film until Evans and Gideon agreed to give up half of their share of profits to meet Lyne's asking fee.

Lyne was going to direct the film, but would not have been available to start production until the spring of 1986. Reiner, who had just began his career as a director, was sent the script by Scheinman; Reiner's initial reaction was that the script had promise but "no focus". After Lyne withdrew from the project, Reiner signed on to direct in September 1984.

In a 2011 interview, Reiner discussed his realization that the film should focus on the character of Gordie:

"In the book, it was about four boys, but...once I made Gordie the central focus of the piece then it made sense to me: this movie was all about a kid who didn't feel good about himself and whose father didn't love him. And through the experience of going to find the dead body and his friendship with these boys, he began to feel empowered and went on to become a very successful writer. He basically became Stephen King."

Reiner has said that he identified with Gordie, as he, too, struggled with the shadow of fame cast by his comedian father, Carl Reiner. The writers incorporated Reiner's suggestions, producing a new script by December 1984 for Embassy's review and approval.

Days before shooting was to begin in the summer of 1985, Columbia Pictures purchased Embassy and planned to cancel the production. Norman Lear, one of Embassy's co-owners and the developer of All in the Family, which featured Reiner, gave $7.5 million of his own money to Reiner to complete the film, citing his faith in Reiner and the script. However, since Embassy was also slated to release the film, once it was completed, there was no distributor; the producers showed a print to Michael Ovitz, head of the powerful Creative Artists Agency, who promised to help find a distributor. Paramount, Universal, and Warner Bros. all passed on the film; Guy McElwaine, head of Columbia Pictures, screened the film at his house and the positive reaction of his daughters convinced him to distribute the film.

In March 1986, Columbia Pictures, concerned that the original title, The Body, was misleading, changed the title of the film to Stand by Me. According to screenwriter Raynold Gideon, The Body "sounded like either a sex film, a bodybuilding film, or another Stephen King horror film. Rob came up with Stand by Me, and it ended up being the least unpopular option." The film's name is derived from Ben E. King's 1961 song, "Stand by Me", which plays during the closing credits.

=== Casting ===
In a 2011 interview with NPR, Wil Wheaton attributed the film's success to the director's casting choices:

Rob Reiner found four young boys who were the characters we played. I was awkward and nerdy and shy and uncomfortable in my skin and sensitive, and River was cool and smart and passionate and even at that age kind of like a father figure to some of us, Jerry was one of the funniest people I had ever seen in my life, either before or since, and Corey was unbelievably angry and in an incredible amount of pain and had a terrible relationship with his parents.

Feldman recalled how his home life translated into his onscreen character: "[Most kids aren't] thinking they're going to get hit by their parents because they're not doing well enough in school, which will prevent them from getting a work permit, which will prevent them from being an actor." O'Connell agreed that he was cast based on how his personality fit the role, saying "Rob wanted us to understand our characters. He interviewed our characters. [...] I tried to stay like Vern and say the stupid things Vern would. I think I was Vern that summer." Reiner and the producers interviewed more than 70 boys for the four main roles, out of more than 300 who auditioned; Phoenix originally read for the part of Gordie Lachance. Ethan Hawke auditioned for Chris Chambers.

Before filming began, Reiner put the four main actors together for two weeks to play games from Viola Spolin's Improvisation for the Theater (which Reiner called "the bible" of theater games) and build camaraderie. As a result, a friendship developed among the actors. Wheaton would later recall, "When you saw the four of us being comrades, that was real life, not acting."

Before settling on Richard Dreyfuss to portray the adult Gordie, Reiner considered David Dukes, Ted Bessell, and Michael McKean.

=== Filming ===
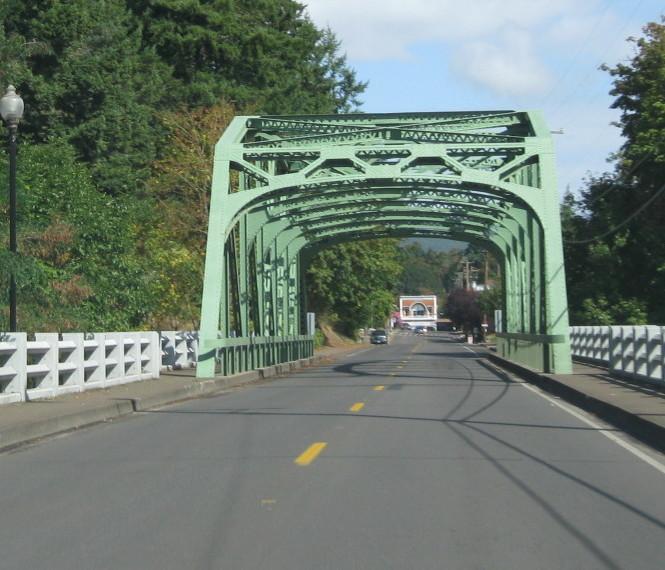
Bridge on the road leading into Brownsville, Oregon, used for the penultimate scenes (2009)

Principal photography began on June 17 and ended on August 23, 1985.

Much of the film was shot in Brownsville, Oregon, which stood in for the fictional town of Castle Rock. Located between Salem and Eugene, the town was selected for its small-town 1950s ambience; approximately 100 local residents were employed as extras. Other scenes were filmed in nearby Cottage Grove, Veneta, Eugene and Junction City.

The "barf-o-rama" scene was also filmed in Brownsville. A local bakery supplied the pies and extra filling, which was mixed with large-curd cottage cheese to simulate the vomit. The quantity of simulated vomit varied per person, from as much as 5 US gallons (19 L) during the triggering event to as little as 1/16 US gallon (0.24 L).

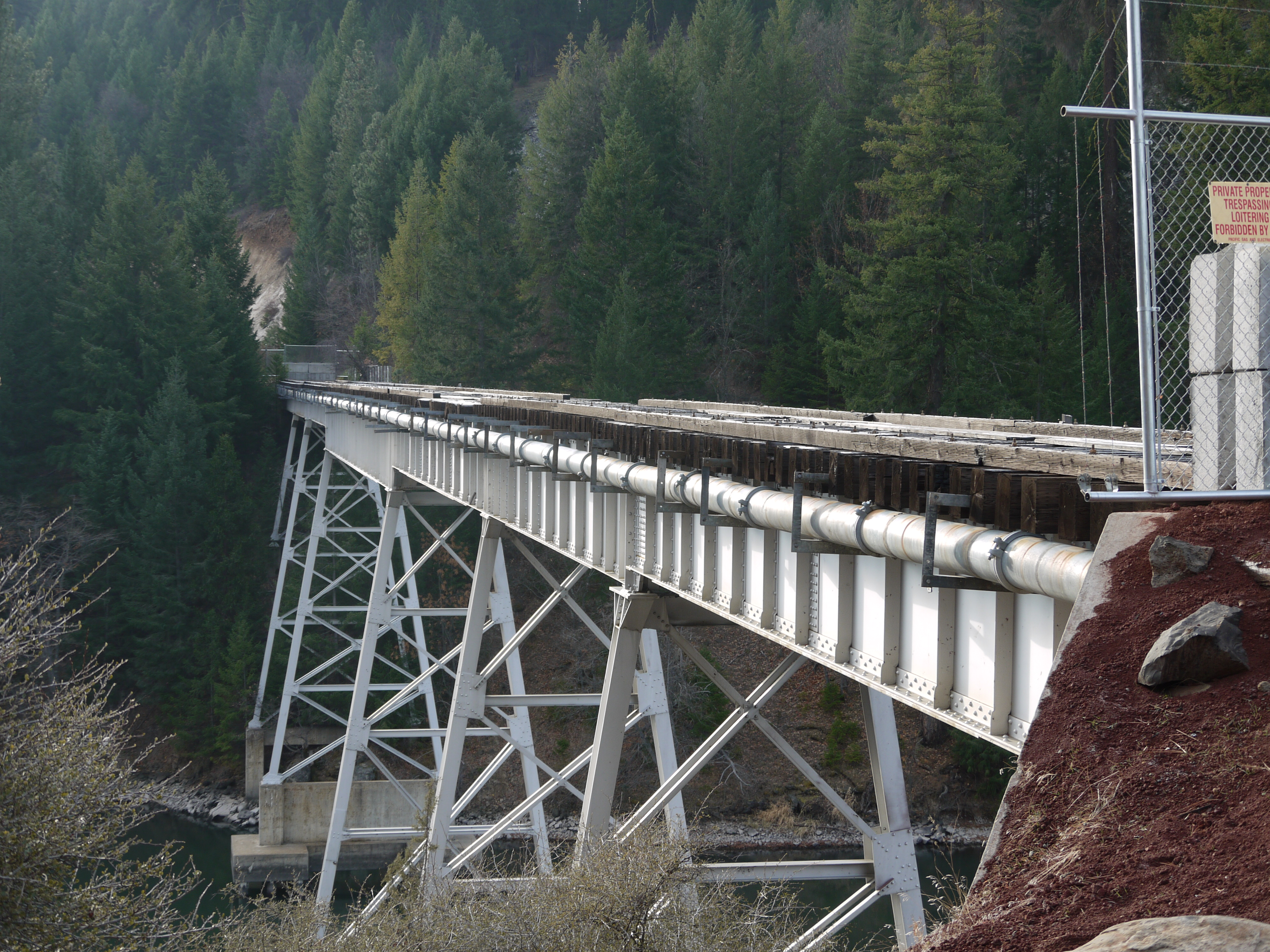
The McCloud River Railroad trestle bridge across Lake Britton in California, which was used for the train chase scene (2012)

The scene in which Teddy tries to dodge a train was filmed using McCloud River Railroad No. 19 on the Oregon, Pacific and Eastern Railway right-of-way; both the locomotive and the railway were also used in the filming of Emperor of the North Pole.

The scene where the boys outrace a steam engine across an 80-foot-tall (24 m) trestle was filmed above Lake Britton Reservoir near McArthur-Burney Falls Memorial State Park on the McCloud River Railroad in northeastern California. That scene took a full week to shoot, and it required the use of four small adult female stunt doubles with closely cropped hair who were made up to look like the film's protagonists. Plywood planks were laid across the ties to provide a safer surface on which the stunt doubles could run. The film crew even brought a brand-new camera for use in the shot, only for it to jam between the rails on the first shot. As of 2016, the locomotive used for the scene—McCloud Railway 25—remained in daily operation for excursion service on the Oregon Coast Scenic Railroad. Telephoto compression was used to make the train appear much closer than it actually was. The actors did not feel a sense of danger until Reiner threatened them by saying, "You see those guys? They don't want to push that dolly down the track anymore. And the reason they're getting tired is because of you... I told them if they weren't worried that the train was going to kill them, then they should worry that I was going to. And that's when they ran."

At Reiner's insistence, the cigarettes smoked by the child actors in the film contained cabbage leaves instead of tobacco.

== Music ==
Jack Nitzsche composed the film's musical score. On August 8, 1986, a soundtrack album was released containing many of the 1950s and early 1960s oldies songs featured in the film:

1. "Everyday" (Buddy Holly) – 2:07
2. "Let the Good Times Roll" (Shirley & Lee) – 2:22
3. "Come Go with Me" (The Del-Vikings) – 2:40
4. "Whispering Bells" (The Del-Vikings) – 2:25
5. "Get a Job" (The Silhouettes) – 2:44
6. "Lollipop" (The Chordettes) – 2:09
7. "Yakety Yak" (The Coasters) – 1:52
8. "Great Balls of Fire" (Jerry Lee Lewis) – 1:52
9. "Mr. Lee" (The Bobbettes) – 2:14
10. "Stand by Me" (Ben E. King) – 2:55

The movie's success sparked a renewed interest in Ben E. King's song "Stand by Me". Initially a number four pop hit in 1961, the song re-entered the Billboard Hot 100 in October 1986, eventually peaking at number nine in December of that year. Bobby Day's song "Rockin Robin" was also used during the film's treehouse scene.

=== Charts ===
Chart (1987)	Peak position
Australia (Kent Music Report)	98

=== Certifications ===
Region	Certification	Certified units/sales
Australia (ARIA)	Platinum	70,000^{^}
United States (RIAA)	Gold	500,000^{^}
^{^} Shipments figures based on certification alone.

== Reception ==
=== Box office ===
The film was a box office success in North America. It opened in a limited release in 16 theaters on August 8, 1986, and grossed $242,795, averaging $15,174 per theater. The film then had its wide opening in 745 theaters on August 22 and grossed $3,812,093, averaging $5,116 per theater and ranking number 2. The film's widest release was 848 theaters, and it ended up earning $52,287,414 overall, well above its $8 million budget.

Beginning March 27, 2026, the film was re-released for a week in honor of its 40th anniversary. On April 10, 2026, Stand by Me began its 40th anniversary re-release in European, Middle Eastern, and African markets. Per Box Office Mojo, the film's overall 40th anniversary earnings were $700,349 domestically (U.S.) and $74,700 internationally as of May 15, 2026.

=== Critical response ===
On the review aggregation website Rotten Tomatoes, the film has an approval rating of 89% based of 148 critics' reviews, with an average rating of 8/10. The website's consensus reads, "Rob Reiner brings warmth, wit, and understated grace to Stand by Me, crafting a deeply affecting coming-of-age tale whose authentic performances and emotional honesty elevate its familiar journey." On Metacritic, the film has a weighted average score of 75 out of 100 based on 20 critics, indicating "generally favorable reviews". Audiences polled by CinemaScore gave the film an average grade of "A" on an A+ to F scale.

Reviewing the film for The New York Times, Walter Goodman opined that Reiner's direction was rather self-conscious, "looking constantly at his audience". While the lead actors were "individually likable", Goodman called the film a "trite narrative" and said that "Reiner's direction hammers in every obvious element in an obvious script." In his review for the Chicago Tribune, Dave Kehr wrote that there was "nothing natural in the way Reiner has overloaded his film with manufactured drama". In contrast, Sheila Benson called the film "[a treasure] absolutely not to be missed" in her review for the Los Angeles Times. Paul Attanasio, reviewing for The Washington Post, called the acting ensemble "wonderful" and particularly praised the performances of Wheaton and Phoenix.

Stephen King was very impressed with the film. On the special features of the 25th anniversary Blu-ray set, King indicated that he considered the film to be the first successful translation to film of any of his works. According to a later interview with Gene Siskel, Reiner recalled that after a private early screening of the film, King excused himself for fifteen minutes to compose himself; he later returned to remark, "'That's the best film ever made out of anything I've written, which isn't saying much. But you've really captured my story. It is autobiographical.'" In a 2016 interview, King said that Stand by Me was his favorite adaptation of his work, alongside The Shawshank Redemption.

=== Awards ===
At the 8th Youth in Film Awards, the film received the Jackie Coogan Award for Outstanding Contribution to Youth Through Motion Picture – Ensemble Cast in a Feature Film (Wil Wheaton, River Phoenix, Corey Feldman, and Jerry O'Connell).

Nominations

- Academy Award for Best Adapted Screenplay (Raynold Gideon and Bruce A. Evans)
- Directors Guild of America Award for Outstanding Directing – Feature Film (Rob Reiner)
- Golden Globe Award for Best Motion Picture – Drama
- Golden Globe Award for Best Director (Rob Reiner)
- Independent Spirit Award for Best Film (Andrew Scheinman, Raynold Gideon, and Bruce A. Evans)
- Independent Spirit Award for Best Director (Rob Reiner)
- Independent Spirit Award for Best Screenplay (Raynold Gideon and Bruce A. Evans)
- National Board of Review Awards 1986 Top Ten Films (awarded)
- Writers Guild of America Award for Best Adapted Screenplay (Raynold Gideon and Bruce A. Evans)

== Legacy ==
In a 2011 piece entitled "25 years of Stand by Me", writer Alex Hannaford opined that "[for] anyone older than about 33, Stand by Me remains one of the greatest films to come out of the Eighties." Hannaford added that the film "has a charm and depth that seems to resonate with each generation".

In 2016, several writers commemorated the 30-year anniversary of the film's release. Rolling Stone's Charles Bramesco called Stand by Me "timeless", "a staple of youthful nostalgia for its deft straddling of the line between childhood and adulthood", and "the rare movie that necessarily gets better with time". Others described the film as a "coming-of-age classic" and as a film that stood at "the apex of the '80s kids' movie boom".

=== Events and tourism ===
Brownsville, Oregon has held an annual "Stand by Me Day" since 2007. The event has attracted international participants. On July 24, 2010, a 25th anniversary celebration of the filming of Stand by Me was held in Brownsville. The event included a cast and crew Q&A session, an amateur pie-eating contest, and an outdoor showing of the film.

In 2013, July 23 was designated as Stand by Me Day by the Brownsville Chamber of Commerce. To encourage tourism, the city has embedded a penny in the street at a location where the fictional Vern found one in the film. An advertising mural painted for the movie production has survived.

Following the July 2024 Stand by Me Day, its event organizers—after input from businesses, fans, volunteers—decided to schedule the annual event for the fourth Saturday of July.

Thousands of fans returned to Brownsville, Oregon, on Saturday, July 25, 2026 for the 40th anniversary celebration of “Stand By Me,” an event that turns the town into a living pilgrimage site for movie lovers. Hosts and filmmakers described how physically walking through the locations where the coming-of-age classic was shot helps the “magic” feel real again. The festival included interviews and documentary elements such as Oregon cinematographer Eli S. Pyke’s short film “Stand By Oregon,” which premiered in Brownsville’s Pioneer Park.

Attendees came from around the world, marked on an information booth map spanning countries including Canada, China, France, Germany, Hungary, Ireland, Japan, Mexico, and New Zealand. Some returned for multiple years—such as Nick Short from England—while others treated the day as a personal story: filmmaker Jonathan Schupak, who traveled from France while dressed as Gordie Lachance, linked the film’s themes to his own search to better understand his relationship with his father. Visitors engaged in autograph collecting, guided walking tours, cosplay-style characters, and scene reenactments, including the gun reveal behind the Brownsville Pharmacy/Blue Point Diner and “The Great Tri-County Bakeoff & Pie Eat.”

The celebration also blended community events with entertainment. Governor Tina Kotek and her spouse attended the fan forum, while local youth and volunteers reprised roles and served as “Pez Girls.” Food offerings included blueberry pancake breakfast, multiple vendors, and nearly 100 blueberry pies sold by The American Legion Post 184. The day wrapped with a classic car show, live music, fan forum, an a cappella performance by the Stand By Me Singers, and an evening screening of the film; reflecting its core message of friendship, loss, and transition from adolescent innocence into adulthood.

=== Film ===
The Oscar-nominated urban drama Boyz n the Hood has several direct references to Stand by Me, including a trip by four young children to see a dead body, and the closing fade-out of one of the main characters. Director John Singleton stated that he included the references because he was a fan of the movie.

The 1995 coming-of-age film Now and Then is often cited as the "female alternative" to Stand by Me.

Jonathan Bernstein states the pop culture discussions between characters in films by Quentin Tarantino originate in the similar semi-serious banter between the boys of Stand by Me.

Reviewers have seen an influence from Stand by Me in the 2011 movie Attack the Block, directed by Joe Cornish.

The movie Mud (2012) has a character (Neckbone) who has been called a "perfect fusion of River Phoenix and Jerry O'Connell in Stand by Me". The writer and director, Jeff Nichols, said of the film "Yeah, you know, I basically remade Stand by Me" when defending the work-in-progress to studio executives.

The Kings of Summer, a 2013 coming-of-age film by Jordan Vogt-Roberts, has been reviewed as being inspired by Stand by Me.

Love and Monsters (2020) includes an excerpt of the song "Stand by Me" and shortly after a scene involving large poisonous leeches.

=== Music ===
Dan Mangan's song "Rows of Houses" (2011) is based on the film and takes the perspective of Gordie Lachance.

=== Production company ===
In 1987, following the success of Stand by Me, Reiner co-founded a film and television production company and named it Castle Rock Entertainment, after the fictional town in which the film is set.

=== Television ===
- The plotline of "The Blunder Years", a 2001 episode from the thirteenth season of The Simpsons, revolves around a repressed childhood trauma in which Homer Simpson, along with his friends Lenny and Carl, discover a body blocking an inlet for the Springfield Quarry.
- The Rick and Morty episode "The Ricklantis Mixup" makes references to the film with four multi-verse Mortys, and another reference during a campfire.
- The web television series Do You Want to See a Dead Body? is inspired by the film, and named after a quote from it.
- In the Family Guy season 7 episode "Three Kings" which aired on May 10, 2009, the first segment of the episode parodies the whole film.
- In the season 2, episode 6 of the HBO series Euphoria, Fezco (Angus Cloud) and Lexi (Maude Apatow), are seen watching Stand by Me and singing the song of the same name together.
- The 2023 Netflix animated series Gamera Rebirth, which was subsequently broadcast on NHK General TV, took inspirations from Stand by Me for the depictions of protagonist children and their summer adventures.

=== Video games ===
The film is referenced in Pokémon Red, Green, Blue, and Yellow for the Nintendo Game Boy, as well their Game Boy Advance remakes, Pokémon FireRed and LeafGreen, where the player character's mother is watching the movie on TV. When interacting with the TV, the player character says: "There's a movie on TV. Four boys are walking on railroad tracks. I better go too." This reference exists in both the original Japanese versions and the English localizations, though the reference changes to The Wizard of Oz in the remakes when the female player character is selected.
