= List of Indian reservations in the United States =

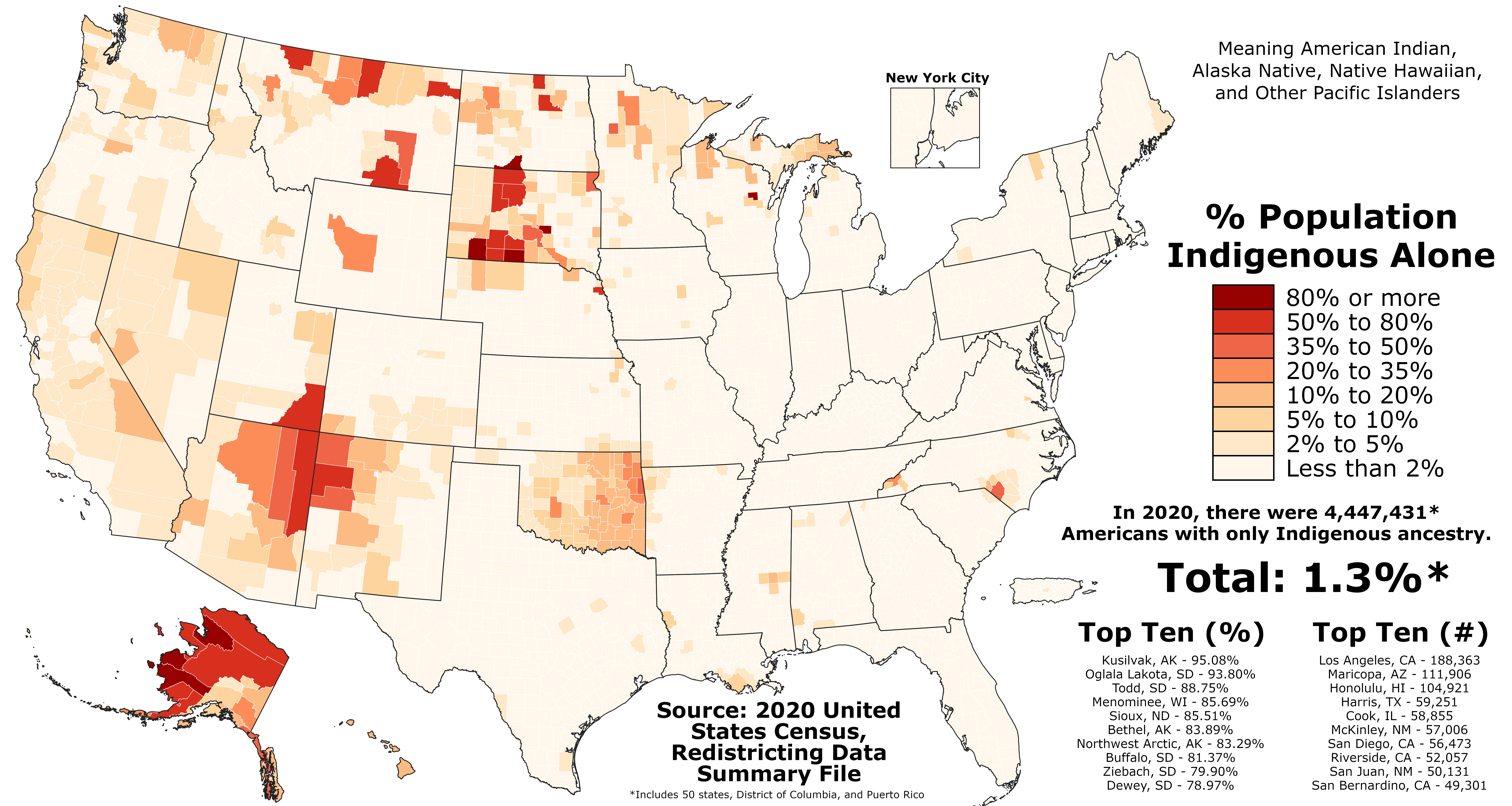
Proportion of Indigenous Americans in each county of the fifty states, the District of Columbia, and Puerto Rico as of the 2020 United States census

This is a list of Native American reservations and other tribal homelands in the United States. In Canada, the Native American reserve is a similar institution.

== Federally recognized reservations ==
There are approximately 326 federally recognized Indian Reservations in the United States.

A Bureau of Indian Affairs map of Indian reservations belonging to federally recognized tribes in the continental United States

Legal/Statistical Area Description	Tribe(s)	State(s)	Population (2020)	Population (2010)	Change	Area in mi^{2} (km^{2})			Includes ORTL?
Legal/Statistical Area Description	Tribe(s)	State(s)	Population (2020)	Population (2010)	Change	Land	Water	Total	Includes ORTL?
Acoma Pueblo Reservation	Acoma	New Mexico	3,230	3,011	+7.27%	595.49 (1,542.32)	0.17 (0.43)	595.66 (1,542.74)	yes
Agua Caliente Indian Reservation	Cahuilla	California	27,090	24,781	+9.32%	53.32 (138.090)	0.36 (0.94)	53.68 (139.04)	yes
Alabama–Coushatta Reservation	Alabama, Coushatta	Texas	679	608	+11.51%	12.50 (32.38)	0.032 (0.084)	12.54 (32.47)	yes
Allegany Reservation	Seneca	New York	6,664	6,490	+2.68%	40.89 (105.90)	7.62 (19.74)	48.51 (125.64)	no
Alturas Indian Rancheria	Achomawi	California	3	15	−80.00%	0.039 (0.10)	0	0.039 (0.10)	no
Annette Island Reserve	Tsimshian	Alaska	1,562	1,460	+6.99%	132.80 (343.95)	82.48 (213.61)	215.28 (557.56)	no
Auburn Rancheria	Miwok	California	2	52	−96.15%	1.77 (4.58)	0	1.77 (4.58)	yes
Augustine Reservation	Cahuilla	California	0	11	−100.00%	0.88 (2.27)	0	0.88 (2.27)	no
Bad River Reservation	Ojibwe	Wisconsin	1,545	1,479	+4.46%	192.78 (499.30)	3.86 (10.00)	196.64 (509.29)	no
Barona Reservation	Kumeyaay	California	756	640	+18.12%	9.31 (24.12)	0	9.31 (24.12)	no
Battle Mountain Reservation	Western Shoshone	Nevada	142	148	−4.05%	1.05 (2.73)	0	1.05 (2.73)	no
Bay Mills Reservation	Ojibwe	Michigan	1,032	1,014	+1.78%	5.41 (14.02)	0.11 (0.29)	5.53 (14.31)	yes
Benton Paiute Reservation	Mono	California	84	76	+10.53%	0.57 (1.47)	0	0.57 (1.47)	yes
Berry Creek Rancheria	Maidu	California	153	152	+0.66%	0.17 (0.44)	0	0.17 (0.44)	yes
Big Bend Rancheria	Pit River	California	5	9	−44.44%	0.069 (0.18)	0	0.069 (0.18)	no
Big Cypress Reservation	Seminole	Florida	239	591	−59.56%	82.15 (212.78)	0.22 (0.58)	82.38 (213.36)	no
Big Lagoon Rancheria	Tolowa, Yurok	California	17	17	0.00%	0.0081 (0.021)	0	0.0081 (0.021)	no
Big Pine Reservation	Mono, Timbisha	California	571	499	+14.43%	0.43 (1.12)	0	0.43 (1.12)	no
Big Sandy Rancheria	Mono	California	175	118	+48.31%	0.39 (1.02)	0	0.39 (1.02)	no
Big Valley Rancheria	Pit River, Pomo	California	191	139	+37.41%	0.19 (0.48)	0	0.19 (0.48)	no
Bishop Reservation	Mono, Timbisha	California	1,907	1,588	+20.09%	1.35 (3.50)	0.014 (0.035)	1.37 (3.54)	no
Blackfeet Indian Reservation	Blackfeet	Montana	10,764	10,405	+3.45%	2,372.58 (6,144.96)	27.55 (71.35)	2,400.13 (6,216.31)	yes
Blue Lake Rancheria	Hupa, Yurok, Wiyot	California	112	58	+93.10%	0.085 (0.22)	0.0035 (0.0091)	0.089 (0.23)	yes
Bois Forte Reservation	Ojibwe	Minnesota	984	874	+12.59%	199.67 (517.13)	12.22 (31.65)	211.89 (548.78)	no
Bridgeport Reservation	Northern Paiute	California	46	35	+31.43%	0.054 (0.14)	0	0.054 (0.14)	no
Brighton Reservation	Seminole	Florida	438	694	−36.89%	57.13 (147.96)	0.022 (0.058)	57.15 (148.02)	no
Burns Paiute Indian Colony	Northern Paiute	Oregon	133	128	+3.91%	18.95 (49.07)	0.026 (0.068)	18.97 (49.13)	yes
Cabazon Reservation	Cahuilla	California	192	835	−77.01%	3.00 (7.77)	0	3.00 (7.77)	no
Cahuilla Reservation	Cahuilla	California	229	187	+22.46%	28.93 (74.94)	0	28.93 (74.94)	no
Campbell Ranch	Northern Paiute	Nevada	291	443	−34.31%	2.59 (6.71)	0	2.59 (6.71)	no
Campo Indian Reservation	Kumeyaay	California	398	362	+9.94%	25.76 (66.73)	0	25.76 (66.73)	no
Capitan Grande Reservation	Kumeyaay	California	0	0	0.00%	24.88 (64.43)	0.00032 (0.00083)	24.88 (64.43)	no
Carson Colony	Washoe	Nevada	238	242	−1.65%	0.28 (0.73)	0	0.28 (0.73)	no
Catawba Reservation	Catawba	South Carolina	849	841	+0.95%	1.58 (4.08)	0	1.58 (4.08)	yes
Cattaraugus Reservation	Seneca	New York	2,676	2,185	+22.47%	33.55 (86.90)	0.86 (2.23)	34.41 (89.13)	no
Cedarville Rancheria	Northern Paiute	California	19	15	+26.67%	0.054 (0.14)	0	0.054 (0.14)	yes
Chehalis Reservation	Lower Chehalis, Upper Chehalis, Klallam, Muckleshoot, Nisqually, Quinault	Washington	767	649	+18.18%	7.17 (18.58)	0.20 (0.53)	7.38 (19.12)	yes
Chemehuevi Reservation	Southern Paiute	California	464	308	+50.65%	48.15 (124.71)	0	48.15 (124.71)	no
Cheyenne River Reservation	Lakota	South Dakota	7,639	8,090	−5.57%	4,265.95 (11,048.76)	153.15 (396.65)	4,419.09 (11,445.40)	yes
Chicken Ranch Rancheria	Miwok	California	4	4	0.00%	0.042 (0.11)	0	0.042 (0.11)	yes
Chitimacha Reservation	Chitimacha	Louisiana	644	555	+16.04%	0.70 (1.82)	0	0.70 (1.82)	no
Cocopah Reservation	Cocopah	Arizona	857	817	+4.90%	10.04 (26.00)	0.029 (0.076)	10.07 (26.07)	no
Coeur d'Alene Reservation	Coeur d'Alene	Idaho	7,567	6,760	+11.94%	523.91 (1,356.93)	12.86 (33.30)	536.77 (1,390.24)	no
Cold Springs Rancheria	Mono	California	79	184	−57.07%	0.16 (0.42)	0	0.16 (0.42)	no
Colorado River Indian Reservation	Chemehuevi, Hopi, Mohave, Navajo	Arizona, California	8,431	8,764	−3.80%	457.31 (1,184.44)	6.83 (17.68)	464.14 (1,202.13)	no
Colusa Rancheria	Wintun	California	91	76	+19.74%	0.40 (1.03)	0	0.40 (1.03)	no
Colville Reservation	Chelan, Colville, Entiat, Methow, Nespelem, Nez Perce, Palouse, Sanpoil, Sinixt, Sinkiuse-Columbia, Syilx, Wenatchi	Washington	7,807	7,687	+1.56%	2,116.03 (5,480.48)	69.17 (179.14)	2,185.19 (5,659.62)	yes
Coos, Lower Umpqua, and Siuslaw Reservation	Hanis Coos, Miluk Coos, Siuslaw	Oregon	77	47	+63.83%	0.22 (0.58)	0.0037 (0.0097)	0.23 (0.59)	yes
Coquille Reservation	Coquille	Oregon	343	323	+6.19%	10.08 (26.11)	0.039 (0.10)	10.12 (26.21)	no
Cortina Indian Rancheria	Wintu	California	8	21	−61.90%	1.19 (3.08)	0	1.19 (3.08)	no
Coushatta Reservation	Coushatta	Louisiana	94	88	+6.82%	1.81 (4.69)	0.0073 (0.019)	1.82 (4.71)	yes
Cow Creek Reservation	Umpqua	Oregon	229	104	+120.19%	5.43 (14.06)	0	5.43 (14.06)	yes
Cowlitz Reservation	Cowlitz	Washington	0		NA	0.24 (0.615)	0	0.24 (0.615)	no
Coyote Valley Reservation	Pomo	California	126	144	−12.50%	0.14 (0.35)	0	0.14 (0.35)	no
Crow Creek Reservation	Dakota	South Dakota	2,054	2,010	+2.19%	422.53 (1,094.36)	38.84 (100.59)	461.37 (1,194.95)	no
Crow Reservation	Crow	Montana	6,974	6,863	+1.62%	3,594.38 (9,309.39)	12.25 (31.74)	3,606.63 (9,341.13)	yes
Dresslerville Colony	Washoe	Nevada		314		1.23 (3.18)	0	1.23 (3.18)	no
Dry Creek Rancheria	Pomo	California		0		0.13 (0.33)	0	0.13 (0.33)	yes
Duck Valley Reservation	Northern Paiute, Northern Shoshone	Idaho, Nevada		1,309		448.53 (1,161.68)	4.08 (10.56)	452.60 (1,172.23)	no
Duckwater Reservation	Western Shoshone	Nevada		156		6.23 (16.14)	0.022 (0.058)	6.25 (16.19)	no
Elk Valley Rancheria	Tolowa, Yurok	California		99		0.42 (1.10)	0	0.42 (1.10)	yes
Elko Colony	Western Shoshone	Nevada		736		0.30 (0.78)	0	0.30 (0.78)	no
Ely Reservation	Western Shoshone	Nevada		202		5.65 (14.63)	0	5.65 (14.63)	no
Enterprise Rancheria	Maidu	California		1		0.066 (0.17)	0	0.066 (0.17)	no
Ewiiaapaayp Reservation	Kumeyaay	California		0		8.55 (22.14)	0	8.55 (22.14)	no
Fallon Paiute-Shoshone Reservation	Northern Paiute, Western Shoshone	Nevada		620		13.04 (33.77)	0	13.04 (33.77)	yes
Flandreau Reservation	Dakota	South Dakota		418		3.46 (8.97)	0.034 (0.087)	3.50 (9.06)	no
Flathead Reservation	Bitterroot Salish, Kutenai, Pend d'Oreilles	Montana		28,359		1,935.79 (5,013.67)	122.14 (316.35)	2,057.93 (5,330.02)	no
Fond du Lac Reservation	Ojibwe	Minnesota, Wisconsin		4,250		154.43 (399.97)	4.90 (12.68)	159.33 (412.66)	yes
Forest County Potawatomi Community	Potawatomi	Wisconsin		588		19.47 (50.44)	0.069 (0.18)	19.54 (50.61)	yes
Fort Apache Reservation	Apache	Arizona		13,409		2,625.22 (6,799.29)	5.99 (15.51)	2,631.21 (6,814.79)	no
Fort Belknap Reservation	Gros Ventre, Nakota	Montana		2,851		1,014.55 (2,627.67)	3.81 (9.87)	1,018.36 (2,637.54)	yes
Fort Berthold Reservation	Arikara, Hidatsa, Mandan	North Dakota		6,341		1,319.11 (3,416.49)	263.50 (682.47)	1,582.62 (4,098.96)	no
Fort Bidwell Reservation	Northern Paiute	California		94		5.48 (14.20)	0.0058 (0.015)	5.49 (14.22)	yes
Fort Hall Reservation	Northern Shoshone	Idaho		5,767		814.16 (2,108.66)	41.44 (107.32)	855.59 (2,215.98)	yes
Fort Independence Reservation	Mono, Western Shoshone	California		93		0.87 (2.26)	0	0.87 (2.26)	no
Fort McDermitt Indian Reservation	Northern Paiute, Western Shoshone	Oregon, Nevada		334		54.39 (140.88)	0	54.39 (140.88)	no
Fort McDowell Yavapai Nation Reservation	Yavapai	Arizona		971		38.60 (99.97)	0.36 (0.93)	38.96 (100.90)	no
Fort Mojave Reservation	Mohave	Arizona, California, Nevada		1,477		51.58 (133.58)	1.15 (2.99)	52.73 (136.57)	yes
Fort Peck Indian Reservation	Assiniboine, Dakota, Lakota, Nakota	Montana		10,008		3,288.66 (8,517.60)	13.34 (34.55)	3,302.00 (8,552.15)	yes
Fort Pierce Reservation	Seminole	Florida		60		0.093 (0.24)	0	0.093 (0.24)	no
Fort Sill Apache Indian Reservation	Apache	New Mexico		0		0.017761 (0.046)	0.00 (0)	0.017761 (0.046)	yes
Fort Yuma Indian Reservation	Quechan	Arizona, California		2,197		68.93 (178.53)	1.39 (3.61)	70.32 (182.14)	no
Gila River Indian Reservation	Maricopa, Pima	Arizona		11,712		584.35 (1,513.45)	0.36 (0.94)	584.71 (1,514.39)	no
Goshute Reservation	Goshute	Nevada, Utah		143		188.09 (487.16)	0.0050 (0.013)	188.10 (487.17)	no
Grand Portage Reservation	Ojibwe	Minnesota		565		74.41 (192.72)	1.24 (3.20)	75.65 (195.92)	yes
Grand Ronde Community	Confederated Tribes of the Grand Ronde Community of Oregon	Oregon		434		16.44 (42.59)	0	16.44 (42.59)	yes
Grand Traverse Reservation	Ojibwe	Michigan		608		1.25 (3.24)	0	1.25 (3.24)	yes
Greenville Rancheria	Maidu	California		33		0.11 (0.28)	0	0.11 (0.28)	no
Grindstone Indian Rancheria	Wintun, Wailaki	California		164		0.13 (0.33)	0.0089 (0.023)	0.14 (0.35)	no
Guidiville Rancheria	Pomo	California		52		0.069 (0.18)	0	0.069 (0.18)	yes
Hannahville Indian Community	Potawatomi	Michigan		523		9.44 (24.45)	0	9.44 (24.45)	yes
Havasupai Reservation	Havasupai	Arizona		465		275.83 (714.40)	0	275.83 (714.40)	no
Ho-Chunk Nation Reservation	Ho-Chunk	Minnesota, Wisconsin		1,375		11.01 (28.51)	0.039 (0.10)	11.05 (28.62)	yes
Hoh Indian Reservation	Hoh	Washington		116		0.66 (1.72)	0.037 (0.097)	0.70 (1.82)	yes
Hollywood Reservation	Seminole	Florida		1,742		0.77 (2.00)	0.022 (0.056)	0.79 (2.05)	no
Hoopa Valley Reservation	Hupa	California		3,041		140.77 (364.59)	0.92 (2.38)	141.68 (366.96)	no
Hopi Reservation	Hopi, Tewa	Arizona		7,185		2,532.19 (6,558.34)	0.93 (2.41)	2,533.12 (6,560.75)	yes
Hopland Rancheria	Pomo	California		38		0.25 (0.64)	0	0.25 (0.64)	no
Houlton Maliseet Reservation	Maliseet	Maine		213		1.39 (3.60)	0.0089 (0.023)	1.40 (3.62)	yes
Hualapai Indian Reservation	Hualapai	Arizona		1,335		1,601.46 (4,147.77)	3.14 (8.12)	1,604.60 (4,155.89)	yes
Huron Potawatomi Reservation	Potawatomi	Michigan		52		0.32 (0.84)	0.0069 (0.018)	0.33 (0.86)	yes
Immokalee Reservation	Seminole	Florida		127		0.97 (2.51)	0.0081 (0.021)	0.98 (2.53)	no
Inaja and Cosmit Reservation	Kumeyaay	California		0		1.34 (3.48)	0	1.34 (3.48)	no
Indian Township Reservation	Passamaquoddy	Maine		718		37.59 (97.37)	6.88 (17.83)	44.48 (115.20)	no
Iowa Reservation	Iowa	Kansas, Nebraska		166		19.89 (51.52)	0.0062 (0.016)	19.90 (51.53)	yes
Isabella Reservation	Saginaw Chippewa	Michigan		26,274		216.62 (561.04)	1.71 (4.44)	218.33 (565.48)	yes
Isleta Pueblo	Tiwa	New Mexico		3,400		330.05 (854.82)	0.93 (2.42)	330.98 (857.24)	no
Jackson Rancheria	Miwok	California		0		0.46 (1.19)	0	0.46 (1.19)	no
Jamestown S'Klallam Reservation	Klallam	Washington		11		0.17 (0.45)	0.039 (0.10)	0.21 (0.55)	yes
Jamul Indian Village	Kumeyaay	California		0		0.023 (0.060)	0	0.023 (0.060)	no
Jemez Pueblo	Jemez	New Mexico		1,815		139.66 (361.71)	0.0050 (0.013)	139.66 (361.73)	no
Jena Band of Choctaw Reservation	Jena Choctaw	Louisiana		0		0.10 (0.26)	0	0.10 (0.26)	no
Jicarilla Apache Nation Reservation	Apache	New Mexico		3,254		1,369.98 (3,548.23)	4.08 (10.57)	1,374.06 (3,558.79)	yes
Kaibab Indian Reservation	Southern Paiute	Arizona		240		189.74 (491.43)	0.0077 (0.020)	189.75 (491.45)	no
Kalispel Reservation	Lower Kalispel	Washington		231		10.39 (26.90)	0.17 (0.45)	10.56 (27.35)	yes
Karuk Reservation	Karuk	California		506		1.49 (3.85)	0.035 (0.091)	1.52 (3.94)	yes
Kickapoo Reservation	Kickapoo	Kansas		4,134		236.27 (611.93)	0.56 (1.46)	236.83 (613.39)	no
Kickapoo Reservation	Kickapoo	Texas		366		0.19 (0.50)	0.00058 (0.0015)	0.19 (0.50)	no
Klamath Reservation	Klamath	Oregon		26		0.50 (1.29)	0	0.50 (1.29)	no
Kootenai Reservation	Kootenai	Idaho		82		3.18 (8.23)	0	3.18 (8.23)	yes
La Jolla Reservation	Luiseño	California		476		13.50 (34.96)	0	13.50 (34.96)	no
La Posta Indian Reservation	Kumeyaay	California		55		6.39 (16.56)	0	6.39 (16.56)	no
Lac Courte Oreilles Reservation	Ojibwe	Wisconsin		2,803		108.29 (280.47)	15.97 (41.37)	124.26 (321.84)	yes
Lac du Flambeau Reservation	Ojibwe	Wisconsin		3,442		107.01 (277.16)	28.20 (73.03)	135.21 (350.19)	no
Lac Vieux Desert Reservation	Chippewa	Michigan		137		0.39 (1.00)	0	0.39 (1.00)	no
Laguna Pueblo	Pueblo People	New Mexico		4,043		788.25 (2,041.56)	0.91 (2.35)	789.16 (2,043.91)	yes
Lake Traverse Reservation	Santee Dakota	North Dakota, South Dakota		10,922		1,449.44 (3,754.03)	59.29 (153.56)	1,508.73 (3,907.59)	yes
L'Anse Reservation	Keweenaw Bay Indian Community	Michigan		3,703		91.97 (238.20)	18.09 (46.85)	110.06 (285.05)	yes
Las Vegas Indian Colony	Southern Paiute	Nevada		154		6.24 (16.15)	0	6.24 (16.15)	no
Laytonville Rancheria	Cahto	California		212		0.31 (0.79)	0	0.31 (0.79)	no
Leech Lake Reservation	Ojibwe	Minnesota		10,660		973.62 (2,521.66)	336.95 (872.69)	1,310.57 (3,394.36)	yes
Likely Rancheria	Pit River	California		0		0.0024 (0.0062)	0	0.0024 (0.0062)	no
Little River Reservation	Odawa	Michigan		57		1.78 (4.62)	0.0028 (0.0073)	1.79 (4.63)	yes
Little Traverse Bay Reservation	Odawa	Michigan		51		1.13 (2.92)	0.00036 (0.00093)	1.13 (2.92)	yes
Lone Pine Reservation	Mono Timbisha	California		212		0.37 (0.95)	0	0.37 (0.95)	no
Lookout Rancheria	Pit River	California		11		0.062 (0.16)	0	0.062 (0.16)	no
Los Coyotes Reservation	Cahuilla Cupeño	California		98		39.21 (101.56)	0	39.21 (101.56)	no
Lovelock Indian Colony	Northern Paiute	Nevada		88		0.032 (0.084)	0	0.032 (0.084)	no
Lower Brule Reservation	Lakota	South Dakota		1,505		343.40 (889.41)	46.15 (119.54)	389.56 (1,008.95)	yes
Lower Elwha Reservation	Klallam	Washington		609		2.04 (5.28)	0.11 (0.29)	2.15 (5.57)	yes
Lower Sioux Indian Community	Dakota	Minnesota		419		2.63 (6.82)	0.046 (0.12)	2.68 (6.94)	no
Lummi Reservation	Lummi, Samish, Nooksack	Washington		4,706		20.66 (53.52)	16.01 (41.47)	36.68 (94.99)	no
Lytton Rancheria	Pomo	California		0		0.0085 (0.022)	0	0.0085 (0.022)	no
Makah Reservation	Makah	Washington		1,414		46.74 (121.06)	0.23 (0.60)	46.97 (121.66)	no
Manchester-Point Arena Rancheria	Pomo	California		212		0.59 (1.52)	0	0.59 (1.52)	no
Manzanita Reservation	Kumeyaay	California		78		7.17 (18.58)	0	7.17 (18.58)	yes
Maricopa Ak Chin Indian Reservation	Oʼodham	Arizona		1,001		32.78 (84.90)	0	32.78 (84.90)	yes
Mashantucket Pequot Reservation	Pequots	Connecticut		299		2.55 (6.61)	0	2.55 (6.61)	yes
Mashpee Wampanoag Reservation	Wampanoag	Massachusetts				0.12 (0.30)	0	0.12 (0.30)	no
Match-e-be-nash-she-wish Band of Pottawatomi Reservation	Potawatomi	Michigan		0		0.24 (0.63)	0	0.24 (0.63)	no
Mattaponi Reservation	Mattaponi	Virginia		65		0.11 (0.28)	0.012 (0.032)	0.12 (0.31)	no
Menominee Reservation	Menominee	Wisconsin		3,141		355.47 (920.66)	7.35 (19.04)	362.82 (939.70)	yes
Mesa Grande Reservation	Kumeyaay	California		98		2.73 (7.06)	0	2.73 (7.06)	no
Mescalero Reservation	Apache	New Mexico		3,613		718.49 (1,860.89)	0.57 (1.47)	719.06 (1,862.36)	no
Miccosukee Reservation	Seminole	Florida		406		136.09 (352.48)	0.031 (0.079)	136.12 (352.56)	yes
Middletown Rancheria	Pomo, Wappo, Miwok	California		56		0.19 (0.49)	0	0.19 (0.49)	no
Mille Lacs Reservation	Ojibwe	Minnesota		4,907		98.49 (255.10)	4.74 (12.27)	103.23 (267.37)	yes
Mississippi Choctaw Reservation	Choctaw	Mississippi		7,436		46.96 (121.62)	0.097 (0.25)	47.05 (121.87)	yes
Moapa River Indian Reservation	Southern Paiute	Nevada		260		110.97 (287.40)	0	110.97 (287.40)	no
Mohegan Reservation	Mohegan	Connecticut		48		0.80 (2.06)	0.000046 (0.00012)	0.80 (2.06)	yes
Montgomery Creek Rancheria	Pit River	California		12		0.12 (0.31)	0	0.12 (0.31)	no
Mooretown Rancheria	Maidu	California		181		0.46 (1.20)	0	0.46 (1.20)	yes
Morongo Reservation	Cahuilla, Serrano	California		913		53.48 (138.50)	0.13 (0.33)	53.60 (138.83)	yes
Muckleshoot Reservation	Duwamish, Stkamish, Smulkamish, Skopamish, Upper Puyallup	Washington		3,870		6.04 (15.65)	0.097 (0.25)	6.14 (15.90)	yes
Nambe Pueblo	Pueblo	New Mexico		1,611		32.36 (83.81)	0.042 (0.11)	32.40 (83.92)	yes
Narragansett Reservation	Narragansett	Rhode Island		0		3.22 (8.33)	0.0021 (0.0055)	3.22 (8.33)	no
Navajo Nation	Navajo	Arizona, New Mexico, Utah		173,667		27,425.00 (71,030.424)	26.49 (68.61)	27,451.49 (71,099.034)	yes
Nez Perce Reservation	Nez Perce	Idaho		18,437		1,193.77 (3,091.85)	10.48 (27.14)	1,204.25 (3,119.00)	no
Nisqually Reservation	Nisqually	Washington		575		7.91 (20.49)	0.31 (0.81)	8.22 (21.29)	no
Nooksack Reservation	Nooksack	Washington		884		4.40 (11.39)	0.093 (0.24)	4.49 (11.62)	yes
North Fork Rancheria	Mono	California		60		0.36 (0.94)	0	0.36 (0.94)	yes
Northern Cheyenne Indian Reservation	Northern Cheyenne	Montana		4,789		706.97 (1,831.05)	0.15 (0.38)	707.12 (1,831.43)	yes
Northwestern Shoshone Reservation	Shoshone	Utah		0		0.31 (0.79)	0	0.31 (0.79)	no
Ohkay Owingeh	Pueblo	New Mexico		6,309		26.41 (68.39)	0.31 (0.80)	26.71 (69.19)	no
Oil Springs Reservation	Seneca	New York		1		0.96 (2.49)	0.011 (0.028)	0.97 (2.52)	no
Omaha Reservation	Omaha	Iowa, Nebraska		4,773		307.03 (795.20)	2.97 (7.68)	309.99 (802.88)	no
Oneida Reservation	Oneida	Wisconsin		22,776		102.20 (264.69)	0.12 (0.31)	102.31 (264.99)	yes
Oneida Nation Reservation	Oneida	New York		25		0.081 (0.21)	0	0.081 (0.21)	no
Onondaga Nation Reservation	Onandaga	New York		468		9.25 (23.95)	0.046 (0.12)	9.29 (24.07)	no
Ontonagon Reservation	Chippewa	Michigan		0		3.74 (9.68)	0	3.74 (9.68)	no
Osage Reservation	Osage	Oklahoma		47,472		2,246.36 (5,818.04)	57.62 (149.23)	2,303.98 (5,967.27)	no
Paiute Reservation	Southern Paiute	Utah		273		50.80 (131.57)	0.019 (0.048)	50.82 (131.62)	no
Pala Reservation	Pala band of Mission Indians	California		1,315		20.35 (52.71)	0	20.35 (52.71)	no
Pamunkey Reservation	Pamunky	Virginia		73		1.71 (4.42)	0.76 (1.96)	2.46 (6.38)	no
Pascua Pueblo Yaqui Reservation	Pascua Yaqui	Arizona		3,484		2.20 (5.70)	0	2.20 (5.70)	yes
Paskenta Rancheria	Paskenta band of Nomlaki Indians	California		0		3.34 (8.66)	0.0035 (0.0091)	3.35 (8.67)	no
Pauma and Yuima Reservation	Luiseño	California		206		9.36 (24.25)	0	9.36 (24.25)	no
Pechanga Reservation	Luiseño	California		346		7.01 (18.16)	0.0024 (0.0061)	7.02 (18.17)	no
Penobscot Reservation	Penebscot	Maine		631		153.22 (396.85)	22.44 (58.13)	175.67 (454.98)	yes
Picayune Rancheria	Foothills Yokuts (Chukchansi subgroup)	California		69		0.31 (0.79)	0.00069 (0.0018)	0.31 (0.79)	yes
Picuris Pueblo	Pueblo	New Mexico		1,886		27.36 (70.85)	0.0027 (0.0071)	27.36 (70.86)	no
Pine Ridge Reservation	Ogalala Lakota	Nebraska, South Dakota		18,834		4,343.21 (11,248.87)	10.59 (27.42)	4,353.80 (11,276.29)	no
Pinoleville Rancheria	Pomo	California		129		0.16 (0.42)	0	0.16 (0.42)	no
Pleasant Point Reservation	Passamaquoddy	Maine		749		0.57 (1.47)	0.41 (1.05)	0.97 (2.52)	no
Poarch Creek Reservation	Muskogee	Alabama, Florida		287		0.62 (1.61)	0.0030 (0.0078)	0.63 (1.62)	yes
Pokagon Reservation	Potawatomi	Indiana, Michigan		29		4.56 (11.81)	0.077 (0.20)	4.64 (12.02)	yes
Port Gamble Reservation	Klallam	Washington		682		1.88 (4.86)	0	1.88 (4.86)	yes
Port Madison Reservation	Suquamish, Duwamish	Washington		7,640		11.65 (30.18)	0	11.65 (30.18)	no
Prairie Band of Potawatomi Nation Reservation	Potawatomi	Kansas, Illinois		1,469		121.51 (314.70)	0.066 (0.17)	121.58 (314.88)	no
Prairie Island Indian Community	Mdewakonton Sioux	Minnesota		217		2.71 (7.03)	0.11 (0.29)	2.83 (7.32)	yes
Pueblo de Cochiti	Pueblo	New Mexico		1,727		80.25 (207.84)	1.87 (4.84)	82.12 (212.68)	no
Pueblo of Pojoaque	Tiwa	New Mexico		3,316		21.41 (55.45)	0	21.41 (55.45)	yes
Puyallup Reservation	Pyallup	Washington		46,816		28.58 (74.01)	0.85 (2.19)	29.42 (76.20)	yes
Pyramid Lake Paiute Reservation	Northern Paiute	Nevada		1,660		555.45 (1,438.61)	174.06 (450.82)	729.52 (1,889.44)	no
Qualla Boundary	Cherokee	North Carolina		9,018		81.69 (211.58)	0.018 (0.047)	81.71 (211.63)	no
Quartz Valley Reservation	Klamath, Karuk, Shasta	California		187		1.11 (2.87)	0.0058 (0.015)	1.12 (2.89)	yes
Quileute Reservation	Quileute	Washington		460		1.60 (4.15)	0.0037 (0.0096)	1.61 (4.16)	no
Quinault Reservation	Quinault	Washington		1,408		312.65 (809.77)	11.43 (29.60)	324.08 (839.36)	no
Ramona Village	Cahuilla	California		13		0.85 (2.20)	0.0058 (0.015)	0.85 (2.21)	no
Red Cliff Reservation	Chippewa	Wisconsin		1,123		22.78 (59.00)	0.14 (0.35)	22.92 (59.35)	yes
Red Lake Reservation	Chippewa	Minnesota		5,896		881.29 (2,282.54)	377.04 (976.53)	1,258.33 (3,259.07)	no
Redding Rancheria	Wintu, Pit River, Yama	California		34		0.042 (0.11)	0.000058 (0.00015)	0.042 (0.11)	no
Redwood Valley Rancheria	Pomo	California		238		0.42 (1.10)	0	0.42 (1.10)	no
Reno-Sparks Indian Colony	Shoshone, Washoe, Southern Paiute	Nevada		919		3.36 (8.70)	0	3.36 (8.70)	no
Resighini Rancheria	Yuruk	California		31		0.34 (0.88)	0	0.34 (0.88)	no
Rincon Reservation	Luiseño	California		1,215		6.16 (15.96)	0	6.16 (15.96)	yes
Roaring Creek Rancheria	Pit River	California		14		0.13 (0.33)	0.000089 (0.00023)	0.13 (0.33)	no
Robinson Rancheria	Pomo	California		207		0.32 (0.82)	0.0026 (0.0067)	0.32 (0.82)	yes
Rocky Boy's Reservation	Chippewa, Cree, Métis	Montana		3,323		171.17 (443.32)	0.17 (0.44)	171.34 (443.76)	yes
Rohnerville Rancheria	Wiyott, Bear River, Mattole	California		38		0.069 (0.18)	0	0.069 (0.18)	no
Rosebud Indian Reservation	Lakota	South Dakota		10,869		1,971.52 (5,106.22)	3.90 (10.10)	1,975.42 (5,116.32)	yes
Round Valley Reservation	Yuki, Wailaki, Pomo, Concow, Nomlaki and Pit River	California		401		36.17 (93.69)	0.054 (0.14)	36.23 (93.83)	yes
Rumsey Indian Rancheria	Southern Wintum	California		77		0.76 (1.98)	0	0.76 (1.98)	no
Sac and Fox Nation Reservation	Sac and Fox	Kansas, Nebraska		173		23.66 (61.29)	0	23.66 (61.29)	yes
Sac and Fox/Meskwaki Settlement	Sac and Fox	Iowa		1,062		9.86 (25.55)	0	9.86 (25.55)	yes
Salt River Reservation	Pima, Maricopa	Arizona		6,289		82.50 (213.67)	2.89 (7.49)	85.39 (221.16)	no
San Carlos Reservation	San Carlos Apache Tribe	Arizona		10,068		2,902.72 (7,518.02)	24.20 (62.68)	2,926.92 (7,580.70)	no
San Felipe Pueblo	Pueblo	New Mexico		3,563		79.50 (205.91)	0.51 (1.31)	80.01 (207.23)	no
San Felipe Pueblo/Santa Ana Pueblo joint-use area	Pueblo	New Mexico		0		1.10 (2.84)	0	1.10 (2.84)	no
San Felipe Pueblo/Santo Domingo Pueblo joint-use area	Pueblo	New Mexico		0		1.24 (3.21)	0	1.24 (3.21)	no
San Ildefonso Pueblo	Pueblo	New Mexico		1,752		47.10 (121.99)	0.21 (0.54)	47.31 (122.53)	yes
San Manuel Reservation	Serrano	California		112		1.05 (2.71)	0	1.05 (2.71)	yes
San Pasqual Reservation	Diegueño Mission Indians	California		1,097		2.24 (5.79)	0	2.24 (5.79)	no
Sandia Pueblo	Pueblo	New Mexico		4,965		38.35 (99.32)	0.55 (1.42)	38.89 (100.73)	no
Santa Ana Pueblo	Pueblo	New Mexico		621		100.53 (260.38)	0.51 (1.33)	101.05 (261.71)	no
Santa Clara Pueblo	Tewa	New Mexico		11,021		76.85 (199.05)	0.25 (0.65)	77.10 (199.70)	yes
Santa Rosa Rancheria	Tachi Yokuts	California		652		0.63 (1.62)	0	0.63 (1.62)	no
Santa Rosa Reservation	Cahuilla	California		71		17.06 (44.19)	0	17.06 (44.19)	no
Santa Ynez Reservation	Chumash	California		271		0.24 (0.63)	0	0.24 (0.63)	no
Santa Ysabel Reservation	Kumeyaay	California		330		23.42 (60.67)	0	23.42 (60.67)	no
Santee Reservation	Santee Sioux	Nebraska		901		172.91 (447.83)	11.60 (30.05)	184.51 (477.88)	no
Santo Domingo Pueblo	Pueblo	New Mexico		3,255		106.05 (274.68)	0.28 (0.73)	106.34 (275.41)	no
Sauk-Suiattle Reservation	Sauk	Washington		71		0.073 (0.19)	0	0.073 (0.19)	no
Sault Ste. Marie Reservation	Sault Tribe of Chippewa	Michigan		1,747		1.96 (5.07)	0.017 (0.045)	1.98 (5.12)	yes
Shakopee Mdewakanton Sioux Community	Mdewakanton Dakota Sioux	Minnesota		658		2.49 (6.45)	0.0013 (0.0034)	2.49 (6.45)	yes
Sherwood Valley Rancheria	Pomo	California		168		0.77 (2.00)	0	0.77 (2.00)	yes
Shingle Springs Rancheria	Miwok	California		102		0.27 (0.70)	0	0.27 (0.70)	yes
Shinnecock Reservation	Shinnecock	New York		662		1.35 (3.49)	0	1.35 (3.49)	no
Shoalwater Bay Indian Reservation	Chinook, Lower Chehalis	Washington		82		1.05 (2.73)	0.25 (0.64)	1.31 (3.38)	yes
Siletz Reservation	Confederated Tribes of Siletz	Oregon		506		6.87 (17.80)	0.00050 (0.0013)	6.87 (17.80)	yes
Skokomish Reservation	Twana, Chemakum	Washington		730		8.21 (21.26)	0.22 (0.57)	8.43 (21.83)	no
Skull Valley Reservation	Goshute	Utah		23		28.16 (72.93)	0	28.16 (72.93)	no
Smith River Rancheria	Tolowa	California		113		0.31 (0.81)	0	0.31 (0.81)	yes
Snoqualmie Reservation	Snoqualmie	Washington		0		0.089 (0.23)	0	0.089 (0.23)	no
Soboba Reservation	Luiseño	California		482		10.62 (27.50)	0.19 (0.48)	10.80 (27.97)	yes
Sokaogon Chippewa Community	Chippewa	Wisconsin		414		4.88 (12.65)	0.34 (0.89)	5.22 (13.53)	yes
South Fork Reservation	Western Shoshone	Nevada		122		26.56 (68.78)	0.0042 (0.011)	26.56 (68.79)	yes
Southern Ute Reservation	Ute	Colorado		12,153		1,058.72 (2,742.07)	4.69 (12.14)	1,063.41 (2,754.21)	no
Spirit Lake Reservation	Dakota	North Dakota		4,238		389.63 (1,009.15)	9.78 (25.33)	399.41 (1,034.47)	no
Spokane Reservation	Spokan	Washington		2,096		238.10 (616.67)	12.34 (31.97)	250.44 (648.63)	yes
Squaxin Island Reservation	Squaxin, Sahewamish	Washington		431		3.35 (8.67)	0.031 (0.079)	3.38 (8.75)	yes
St. Croix Reservation	Chippewa	Wisconsin		768		3.71 (9.60)	0.10 (0.26)	3.81 (9.86)	yes
St. Regis Mohawk Reservation	Mohawk	New York		3,228		18.94 (49.06)	2.05 (5.31)	20.99 (54.36)	no
Standing Rock Reservation	Dakota, Lakota	North Dakota, South Dakota		8,217		3,568.44 (9,242.21)	94.20 (243.97)	3,662.63 (9,486.18)	no
Stewart Community	Washoe	Nevada		147		4.42 (11.45)	0.0023 (0.0060)	4.42 (11.45)	no
Stewarts Point Rancheria	Pomo	California		78		0.066 (0.17)	0	0.066 (0.17)	no
Stillaguamish Reservation	Stillaguamish	Washington		4		0.35 (0.90)	0	0.35 (0.90)	yes
Stockbridge Munsee Community	Stockbridge (Mohican-Wapinger), Munsee	Wisconsin		644		23.83 (61.73)	0.037 (0.096)	23.87 (61.83)	yes
Sulphur Bank Rancheria	Pomo	California		61		0.073 (0.19)	0.0089 (0.023)	0.085 (0.22)	no
Summit Lake Reservation	Northern Paiute	Nevada		1		19.02 (49.26)	0.71 (1.84)	19.73 (51.09)	yes
Susanville Indian Rancheria	Northern Paiute, Pit River, Mountain Maidu, Washoe	California		549		1.67 (4.33)	0	1.67 (4.33)	yes
Swinomish Reservation	Swinomish, Lower Skagit, Squinamish, Kikiallus	Washington		3,010		11.91 (30.84)	9.11 (23.60)	21.02 (54.44)	yes
Sycuan Reservation	Mission	California		211		1.28 (3.31)	0	1.28 (3.31)	yes
Table Bluff Reservation	Wiyot	California		103		0.12 (0.31)	0	0.12 (0.31)	no
Table Mountain Rancheria	Yokut	California		64		0.21 (0.55)	0	0.21 (0.55)	no
Tampa Reservation	Seminole	Florida		0		0.069 (0.18)	0.00069 (0.0018)	0.069 (0.18)	no
Taos Pueblo	Taos (Tiwa)	New Mexico		4,384		156.14 (404.39)	0.058 (0.15)	156.20 (404.55)	yes
Tesuque Pueblo	Pueblo	New Mexico		841		26.93 (69.75)	0	26.93 (69.75)	yes
Timbi-Sha Shoshone Reservation	Shoshone	California, Nevada		24		12.79 (33.12)	0	12.79 (33.12)	yes
Tohono Oʼodham Indian Reservation	Tohono O'odham Nation	Arizona		10,201		4,453.49 (11,534.49)	0.34 (0.88)	4,453.83 (11,535.37)	yes
Tonawanda Reservation	Seneca	New York		517		11.80 (30.56)	0.069 (0.18)	11.87 (30.74)	no
Tonto Apache Reservation	Tonto Apache	Arizona		120		0.13 (0.34)	0	0.13 (0.34)	yes
Torres-Martinez Reservation	Cahuilla	California		5,594		34.22 (88.62)	15.04 (38.96)	49.26 (127.58)	no
Trinidad Rancheria	Chetco, Hupa, Wiyot, Karuk, Tolowa, Yuruk	California		132		0.13 (0.34)	0	0.13 (0.34)	yes
Tulalip Reservation	Snohomish, Snoqualmie, Skykomish	Washington		10,631		34.75 (89.99)	17.47 (45.25)	52.22 (135.24)	yes
Tule River Reservation	Yokut, Mono, Tübatulabal	California		1,049		84.29 (218.32)	0	84.29 (218.32)	yes
Tunica-Biloxi Reservation	Tunica, Biloxi (as well as some Avoyel, Choktaw, Ofo)	Louisiana		121		1.22 (3.15)	0	1.22 (3.15)	yes
Tuolumne Rancheria	Miwok	California		185		0.59 (1.54)	0	0.59 (1.54)	no
Turtle Mountain Reservation	Plains Ojibwe, Métis	Montana, North Dakota, South Dakota		8,669		227.49 (589.19)	9.95 (25.76)	237.43 (614.95)	yes
Tuscarora Nation Reservation	Tuscarora	New York		1,152		9.08 (23.52)	0	9.08 (23.52)	no
Twenty-Nine Palms Reservation	Mission	California		12		0.60 (1.56)	0	0.60 (1.56)	no
Uintah and Ouray Reservation	Ute	Utah		24,369		6,774.15 (17,544.96)	50.98 (132.04)	6,825.13 (17,677.00)	yes
Umatilla Reservation	Walla, Cayuse, Umatilla	Oregon		3,031		270.70 (701.11)	0	270.70 (701.11)	yes
Upper Lake Rancheria	Pomo	California		87		0.74 (1.92)	0.0033 (0.0086)	0.75 (1.93)	no
Upper Sioux Community	Dakota	Minnesota		148		2.01 (5.20)	0.046 (0.12)	2.05 (5.31)	yes
Upper Skagit Reservation	Upper Skagit	Washington		220		0.18 (0.46)	0	0.18 (0.46)	no
Ute Mountain Reservation	Ute	Colorado, New Mexico, Utah		1,742		900.74 (2,332.91)	0.23 (0.60)	900.97 (2,333.50)	yes
Viejas Reservation	Kumeyaay	California		520		2.51 (6.50)	0	2.51 (6.50)	no
Walker River Reservation	Paiute	Nevada		746		528.35 (1,368.42)	3.00 (7.78)	531.35 (1,376.20)	no
Warm Springs Reservation	Wasco, Tenino, Northern Paiute	Oregon		4,012		1,018.91 (2,638.96)	4.13 (10.70)	1,023.04 (2,649.66)	yes
Wells Colony	Western Shoshone	Nevada		70		0.13 (0.33)	0	0.13 (0.33)	no
White Earth Reservation	Chippewa	Minnesota		9,562		1,097.56 (2,842.68)	69.45 (179.87)	1,167.01 (3,022.55)	yes
Wind River Reservation	Eastern Shoshone, Arapaho	Wyoming		26,490		3,474.82 (8,999.75)	57.79 (149.68)	3,532.61 (9,149.43)	yes
Winnebago Reservation	Winnebago	Iowa, Nebraska		2,694		176.97 (458.35)	1.14 (2.94)	178.11 (461.30)	yes
Winnemucca Indian Colony	Western Shoshone, Northern Paiute	Nevada		53		0.56 (1.44)	0	0.56 (1.44)	no
Woodfords Community	Washoe	California		214		0.61 (1.58)	0	0.61 (1.58)	no
XL Ranch Rancheria	Pit River	California		60		15.24 (39.46)	0.016 (0.042)	15.25 (39.50)	no
Yakama Nation Reservation	Klikiat, Palus, Wallawalla, Wenatchi, Wishram, and Yakama	Washington		31,272		2,186.35 (5,662.61)	1.64 (4.24)	2,187.98 (5,666.85)	yes
Yankton Reservation	Yankton Sioux Tribe of the Dakota People	South Dakota		6,465		665.47 (1,723.55)	19.07 (49.38)	684.53 (1,772.93)	no
Yavapai-Apache Nation Reservation	Yavapai-Apache	Arizona		718		1.01 (2.61)	0	1.01 (2.61)	no
Yavapai-Prescott Reservation	Yavapai-Prescott	Arizona		192		2.20 (5.71)	0	2.20 (5.71)	no
Yerington Colony	Yerington Paiute	Nevada		151		0.031 (0.081)	0	0.031 (0.081)	no
Yomba Reservation	Yomba Shoshone	Nevada		95		7.30 (18.91)	0.0042 (0.011)	7.31 (18.92)	no
Ysleta del Sur Pueblo	Tigua Pueblo	Texas		804		5.03 (13.03)	0	5.03 (13.03)	yes
Yurok Reservation	Yurok	California		1,238		84.73 (219.46)	3.35 (8.67)	88.08 (228.13)	no
Zia Pueblo	Zia	New Mexico		737		191.08 (494.90)	0.046 (0.12)	191.12 (495.01)	yes
Zuni Reservation	Zuni Pueblo	Arizona, New Mexico		7,891		724.55 (1,876.58)	1.27 (3.30)	725.82 (1,879.87)	yes

== Federally recognized trust lands ==
Legal/Statistical Area Description	Tribe(s)	State(s)	Population (2010)	Area in mi^{2} (km^{2})		
Legal/Statistical Area Description	Tribe(s)	State(s)	Population (2010)	Land	Water	Total
Buena Vista Rancheria Trust Land	Miwok	California		0.10 (0.271)	0	0.10 (0.271)
Chico Rancheria Trust Land	Maidu	California		0.98 (2.536)	0	0.98 (2.536)
Cloverdale Rancheria Trust Land	Pomo	California		0.097 (0.25)	0	0.097 (0.25)
Coconut Creek Trust Land	Seminole	Florida	0	0.010 (0.026)	0	0.010 (0.026)
Graton Rancheria Trust Land	Miwok, Pomo	California		0.40 (1.03)	0	0.40 (1.03)
Sac and Fox Nation Trust Land	Meskwaki, Sauk	Kansas	0	0.41 (1.06)	0	0.41 (1.06)
Mi'kmaq Nation Trust Land	Miꞌkmaq	Maine	197	1.64 (4.24)	0	1.64 (4.24)
Minnesota Chippewa Trust Land	Ojibwe	Minnesota	64	0.58 (1.50)	0	0.58 (1.50)
Passamaquoddy Trust Land	Passamaquoddy	Maine	0	143.38 (371.35)	5.96 (15.43)	149.34 (386.78)
Penobscot Trust Land	Penobscot	Maine	0	145.7 (377.36)		
Pit River Trust Land	Pit River	California	4	0.42 (1.09)	0.00020 (0.00052)	0.42 (1.09)
Ponca Trust Land	Ponca	Iowa, Nebraska	10	0.32 (0.83)	0	0.32 (0.83)
Seminole Trust Land	Seminole	Florida	0	0.0028 (0.0073)	0	0.0028 (0.0073)
Wampanoag-Aquinnah Trust Land	Wampanoag	Massachusetts	76	0.73 (1.90)	0.0085 (0.022)	0.75 (1.93)
Washoe Ranches Trust Land	Washoe	California, Nevada	2,916	144.99 (375.53)	1.05 (2.71)	146.04 (378.24)
Wilton Rancheria Trust Land	Miwok	California		0.05637 (0.146)	0	0.05637 (0.146)

== Alaska Native village statistical areas ==
Alaska Native Village Statistical Areas are geographical areas the United States Census Bureau uses to track demographic data. These statistical areas represent permanent or seasonal residences of Alaska natives. Specifically, they contain a significant proportion of persons who are either member of, or receiving services from a defining Alaska Native Village for at least one season of the year. Alaska Natives previously had many small reserves scattered around Alaska; however, all but one (the Annette Island Reserve of Tsimshian) were repealed with the passage of the Alaska Native Claims Settlement Act in 1971.

Legal/Statistical Area Description	Population (2010)	Area in mi^{2} (km^{2})		
Legal/Statistical Area Description	Population (2010)	Land	Water	Total
Akhiok	71	7.77 (20.12)	2.44 (6.33)	10.21 (26.45)
Akiachak	627	14.52 (37.61)	1.59 (4.13)	16.11 (41.73)
Akiak	346	1.01 (2.62)	0.025 (0.064)	1.03 (2.68)
Akutan	1,003	1.42 (3.67)	0.097 (0.25)	1.52 (3.93)
Alakanuk	677	29.53 (76.49)	10.04 (26.01)	39.57 (102.49)
Alatna	32	18.00 (46.61)	0.36 (0.94)	18.36 (47.55)
Aleknagik	219	12.31 (31.89)	6.80 (17.61)	19.11 (49.50)
Algaaciq	424	2.15 (5.57)	0.26 (0.67)	2.41 (6.24)
Allakaket	171	8.50 (22.02)	0.61 (1.58)	9.11 (23.60)
Ambler	258	8.98 (23.26)	1.54 (4.00)	10.53 (27.26)
Anaktuvuk Pass	324	4.83 (12.52)	0.054 (0.14)	4.89 (12.66)
Andreafsky	83	25.59 (66.29)	2.22 (5.74)	27.81 (72.03)
Angoon	459	24.41 (63.22)	14.36 (37.19)	38.77 (100.41)
Aniak	501	11.78 (30.50)	2.38 (6.17)	14.16 (36.67)
Anvik	85	9.68 (25.07)	2.27 (5.89)	11.95 (30.96)
Arctic Village	152	11.96 (30.97)	3.75 (9.70)	15.71 (40.68)
Atka	61	8.58 (22.21)	0.33 (0.86)	8.91 (23.07)
Atmautluak	277	0.54 (1.41)	0.47 (1.21)	1.01 (2.61)
Atqasuk	233	38.71 (100.25)	3.62 (9.37)	42.32 (109.62)
Utqiaġvik	4,212	18.84 (48.79)	2.66 (6.89)	21.50 (55.68)
Beaver	84	20.25 (52.46)	0.75 (1.94)	21.00 (54.40)
Belkofski	0	2.67 (6.91)	0.78 (2.01)	3.44 (8.92)
Bethel	6,080	43.18 (111.84)	5.52 (14.30)	48.71 (126.15)
Bill Moore's	0	2.44 (6.33)	0	2.44 (6.33)
Birch Creek	33	8.75 (22.65)	0.25 (0.66)	9.00 (23.31)
Brevig Mission	388	2.56 (6.63)	0.069 (0.18)	2.63 (6.81)
Buckland	416	1.41 (3.64)	0.16 (0.42)	1.57 (4.06)
Cantwell	219	99.45 (257.58)	0.058 (0.15)	99.51 (257.73)
Canyon Village	0	30.77 (79.69)	3.15 (8.16)	33.92 (87.85)
Chalkyitsik	69	8.48 (21.97)	0.28 (0.73)	8.76 (22.70)
Chefornak	418	5.72 (14.81)	0.68 (1.75)	6.39 (16.56)
Chenega	76	29.29 (75.85)	0.28 (0.72)	29.56 (76.57)
Chevak	938	0.99 (2.56)	0.021 (0.055)	1.01 (2.62)
Chickaloon	23,087	5,956.81 (15,428.08)	60.48 (156.65)	6,017.30 (15,584.73)
Chignik	91	11.39 (29.49)	4.49 (11.62)	15.87 (41.11)
Chignik Lagoon	78	13.77 (35.67)	0	13.77 (35.67)
Chignik Lake	73	15.49 (40.12)	3.85 (9.96)	19.34 (50.09)
Chilkat	99	1.53 (3.95)	0.53 (1.36)	2.05 (5.31)
Chilkoot	441	0.47 (1.21)	0	0.47 (1.21)
Chistochina	78	26.80 (69.40)	0	26.80 (69.40)
Chitina	96	119.45 (309.37)	0.32 (0.83)	119.77 (310.20)
Chuathbaluk	118	3.47 (8.98)	1.72 (4.46)	5.19 (13.44)
Chulloonawick	0	35.72 (92.52)	10.27 (26.59)	45.99 (119.12)
Circle	104	106.04 (274.63)	0.54 (1.40)	106.58 (276.03)
Clarks Point	62	3.07 (7.96)	0.98 (2.54)	4.05 (10.50)
Copper Center	442	15.41 (39.90)	0	15.41 (39.90)
Council	0	21.24 (55.01)	0.91 (2.35)	22.15 (57.36)
Craig	1,478	14.51 (37.57)	2.32 (6.01)	16.83 (43.58)
Crooked Creek	105	99.82 (258.52)	7.58 (19.62)	107.39 (278.14)
Deering	122	5.05 (13.07)	0.073 (0.19)	5.12 (13.26)
Dillingham	2,378	70.90 (183.63)	2.78 (7.19)	73.68 (190.82)
Dot Lake	62	4.27 (11.05)	0	4.27 (11.05)
Douglas	5,474	76.54 (198.24)	0.039 (0.10)	76.58 (198.35)
Eagle	69	17.01 (44.06)	0	17.01 (44.06)
Eek	296	0.91 (2.36)	0.12 (0.32)	1.03 (2.68)
Egegik	109	33.03 (85.54)	38.27 (99.12)	71.30 (184.66)
Eklutna	54	4.55 (11.79)	4.02 (10.41)	8.57 (22.19)
Ekuk	2	4.24 (10.97)	0	4.24 (10.97)
Ekwok	115	16.27 (42.15)	1.24 (3.22)	17.52 (45.37)
Elim	330	307.23 (795.72)	8.77 (22.72)	316.00 (818.44)
Emmonak	762	7.67 (19.87)	1.48 (3.84)	9.16 (23.72)
Evansville	26	6.02 (15.59)	0	6.02 (15.59)
Eyak	128	14.18 (36.73)	0.69 (1.80)	14.88 (38.53)
False Pass	35	12.76 (33.06)	0	12.76 (33.06)
Fort Yukon	583	7.25 (18.77)	0.22 (0.57)	7.47 (19.34)
Gakona	122	36.69 (95.03)	0	36.69 (95.03)
Galena	470	17.17 (44.48)	6.37 (16.49)	23.54 (60.97)
Gambell	681	10.90 (28.23)	1.88 (4.87)	12.78 (33.10)
Georgetown	2	43.80 (113.45)	1.12 (2.90)	44.92 (116.35)
Golovin	156	3.72 (9.64)	0	3.72 (9.64)
Goodnews Bay	243	3.73 (9.65)	0	3.73 (9.65)
Grayling	194	10.96 (28.39)	0.013 (0.033)	10.98 (28.43)
Gulkana	136	4.33 (11.22)	0	4.33 (11.22)
Hamilton	0	5.06 (13.11)	0.15 (0.40)	5.21 (13.50)
Healy Lake	13	47.37 (122.68)	8.28 (21.45)	55.65 (144.14)
Holy Cross	178	30.19 (78.19)	7.05 (18.27)	37.24 (96.46)
Hoonah	760	6.01 (15.56)	1.28 (3.32)	7.29 (18.87)
Hooper Bay	1,093	8.22 (21.29)	0.32 (0.84)	8.54 (22.13)
Hughes	78	3.94 (10.21)	1.13 (2.93)	5.08 (13.15)
Huslia	275	16.43 (42.56)	0.64 (1.67)	17.08 (44.24)
Hydaburg	376	0.58 (1.51)	0.0022 (0.0058)	0.58 (1.51)
Igiugig	54	20.58 (53.30)	1.54 (4.00)	22.12 (57.30)
Iliamna	109	37.13 (96.17)	0.46 (1.20)	37.59 (97.37)
Inalik	115	2.84 (7.36)	0	2.84 (7.36)
Ivanof Bay	7	4.19 (10.86)	0	4.19 (10.86)
Kake	557	8.96 (23.21)	6.01 (15.56)	14.97 (38.78)
Kaktovik	239	0.72 (1.87)	0.22 (0.58)	0.95 (2.45)
Kalskag	210	3.69 (9.55)	0.44 (1.15)	4.13 (10.70)
Kaltag	190	21.59 (55.92)	6.02 (15.60)	27.61 (71.51)
Karluk	37	24.39 (63.17)	1.10 (2.85)	25.49 (66.03)
Kasaan	49	6.00 (15.54)	0.49 (1.27)	6.49 (16.81)
Kasigluk	569	12.08 (31.29)	1.04 (2.70)	13.12 (33.99)
Kenaitze	32,902	1,959.09 (5,074.01)	97.19 (251.73)	2,056.28 (5,325.74)
Ketchikan	12,742	21.60 (55.95)	0.10 (0.27)	21.71 (56.22)
Kiana	363	1.11 (2.87)	0	1.11 (2.87)
King Cove	938	11.69 (30.28)	2.50 (6.47)	14.19 (36.75)
King Salmon	167	9.95 (25.78)	0.12 (0.30)	10.07 (26.08)
Kipnuk	639	19.99 (51.77)	0.32 (0.82)	20.31 (52.60)
Kivalina	374	1.49 (3.87)	2.46 (6.38)	3.96 (10.26)
Klawock	591	0.70 (1.81)	0.27 (0.69)	0.97 (2.50)
Knik	65,768 (6,600 native)	6,888.41 (17,840.90)	476.43 (1,233.94)	7,364.83 (19,074.83)
Kobuk	151	16.22 (42.01)	0.52 (1.35)	16.74 (43.36)
Kodiak	0	48.69 (126.10)	0.38 (0.99)	49.07 (127.10)
Kokhanok	170	20.83 (53.94)	0.12 (0.30)	20.94 (54.24)
Kongiganak	439	1.88 (4.87)	0.11 (0.28)	1.99 (5.15)
Kotlik	577	3.78 (9.79)	0.73 (1.88)	4.50 (11.66)
Kotzebue	3,201	26.92 (69.72)	1.68 (4.36)	28.60 (74.08)
Koyuk	332	4.77 (12.35)	0	4.77 (12.35)
Koyukuk	96	5.60 (14.51)	0.11 (0.29)	5.71 (14.80)
Kwethluk	721	10.06 (26.05)	1.56 (4.04)	11.61 (30.08)
Kwigillingok	321	23.74 (61.49)	0.089 (0.23)	23.83 (61.71)
Kwinhagak	669	4.37 (11.33)	0.96 (2.48)	5.33 (13.81)
Lake Minchumina	11	3.86 (9.99)	0.40 (1.04)	4.26 (11.03)
Larsen Bay	87	5.39 (13.96)	2.21 (5.72)	7.60 (19.68)
Lesnoi	0	2.41 (6.25)	0.12 (0.31)	2.53 (6.56)
Levelock	69	12.10 (31.33)	0	12.10 (31.33)
Lime Village	29	76.49 (198.11)	2.19 (5.67)	78.68 (203.78)
Lower Kalskag	282	1.22 (3.17)	0.49 (1.28)	1.72 (4.45)
Manley Hot Springs	89	15.05 (38.99)	0	15.05 (38.99)
Manokotak	442	35.74 (92.56)	1.41 (3.64)	37.14 (96.20)
Marshall	414	4.58 (11.87)	0.0039 (0.010)	4.59 (11.88)
Mary's Igloo	0	0.44 (1.15)	0.050 (0.13)	0.49 (1.28)
McGrath	346	47.32 (122.55)	7.14 (18.50)	54.46 (141.04)
Mekoryuk	191	6.37 (16.49)	0.0054 (0.014)	6.37 (16.51)
Mentasta Lake	92	37.78 (97.85)	1.71 (4.43)	39.49 (102.27)
Minto	210	3.02 (7.83)	0	3.02 (7.83)
Mountain Village	813	108.10 (279.97)	31.82 (82.41)	139.92 (362.38)
Naknek	544	81.55 (211.21)	0.66 (1.71)	82.21 (212.92)
Nanwalek	254	8.39 (21.72)	0.014 (0.036)	8.40 (21.75)
Napaimute	2	25.19 (65.25)	3.21 (8.32)	28.40 (73.56)
Napakiak	354	4.41 (11.42)	0.62 (1.60)	5.02 (13.01)
Napaskiak	405	3.63 (9.39)	0.35 (0.91)	3.98 (10.31)
Nelson Lagoon	52	4.56 (11.82)	0.077 (0.20)	4.64 (12.01)
Nenana	378	5.90 (15.27)	0.058 (0.15)	5.95 (15.42)
New Koliganek	209	16.73 (43.32)	0.34 (0.89)	17.07 (44.21)
New Stuyahok	510	32.48 (84.13)	2.23 (5.78)	34.71 (89.91)
Newhalen	190	5.90 (15.29)	2.33 (6.03)	8.23 (21.32)
Newtok	354	8.32 (21.55)	0.12 (0.31)	8.44 (21.86)
Nightmute	261	5.24 (13.57)	0.0046 (0.012)	5.24 (13.58)
Nikolai	94	4.60 (11.91)	0.29 (0.74)	4.88 (12.65)
Nikolski	18	19.64 (50.88)	0.73 (1.90)	20.37 (52.77)
Ninilchik	14,512	898.69 (2,327.60)	530.10 (1,372.96)	1,428.79 (3,700.56)
Noatak	514	16.20 (41.97)	0.69 (1.78)	16.89 (43.75)
Nome	3,681	125.08 (323.95)	8.70 (22.52)	133.77 (346.47)
Nondalton	164	8.21 (21.27)	0.58 (1.51)	8.80 (22.78)
Noorvik	668	0.94 (2.43)	0.42 (1.09)	1.36 (3.52)
Northway	242	35.89 (92.95)	3.38 (8.75)	39.27 (101.70)
Nuiqsut	402	9.42 (24.40)	0	9.42 (24.40)
Nulato	264	41.56 (107.65)	2.32 (6.01)	43.88 (113.66)
Nunam Iqua	187	12.13 (31.42)	6.35 (16.45)	18.48 (47.87)
Nunapitchuk	496	7.46 (19.31)	1.00 (2.59)	8.46 (21.90)
Ohogamiut	0	8.96 (23.21)	0.025 (0.066)	8.98 (23.27)
Old Harbor	218	20.53 (53.17)	5.99 (15.52)	26.52 (68.69)
Oscarville	70	2.56 (6.64)	0.19 (0.50)	2.76 (7.14)
Ouzinkie	172	12.95 (33.54)	1.92 (4.98)	14.87 (38.52)
Paimiut	0	25.32 (65.58)	0	25.32 (65.58)
Pedro Bay	42	17.05 (44.17)	2.25 (5.83)	19.31 (50.01)
Perryville	113	11.15 (28.89)	0.020 (0.051)	11.17 (28.94)
Petersburg	2,347	2.39 (6.19)	0.16 (0.42)	2.55 (6.61)
Pilot Point	68	10.91 (28.26)	0.066 (0.17)	10.98 (28.43)
Pilot Station	568	1.69 (4.38)	0.57 (1.47)	2.26 (5.85)
Pitkas Point	109	1.54 (3.99)	0	1.54 (3.99)
Platinum	59	25.67 (66.48)	1.60 (4.14)	27.27 (70.63)
Point Hope	674	4.82 (12.48)	0.069 (0.18)	4.89 (12.66)
Point Lay	189	28.51 (73.85)	3.78 (9.78)	32.29 (83.63)
Port Alsworth	159	22.64 (58.65)	0.062 (0.16)	22.71 (58.81)
Port Graham	177	6.39 (16.54)	0	6.39 (16.54)
Port Heiden	102	50.63 (131.13)	0.39 (1.00)	51.02 (132.14)
Port Lions	194	84.76 (219.52)	22.03 (57.06)	106.79 (276.58)
Portage Creek	2	12.87 (33.34)	0	12.87 (33.34)
Rampart	24	2.00 (5.17)	0	2.00 (5.17)
Red Devil	23	25.13 (65.08)	2.70 (6.99)	27.83 (72.07)
Ruby	166	7.63 (19.76)	0	7.63 (19.76)
Russian Mission	312	5.58 (14.46)	0.36 (0.93)	5.94 (15.39)
Salamatof	980	8.09 (20.95)	0.17 (0.44)	8.26 (21.39)
Sand Point	976	7.70 (19.94)	0.17 (0.45)	7.87 (20.38)
Savoonga	671	6.10 (15.79)	0	6.10 (15.79)
Saxman	411	0.98 (2.53)	0	0.98 (2.53)
Scammon Bay	474	0.63 (1.62)	0	0.63 (1.62)
Selawik	829	2.93 (7.58)	1.18 (3.06)	4.11 (10.64)
Seldovia	427	13.22 (34.24)	1.31 (3.38)	14.53 (37.62)
Shageluk	83	11.09 (28.72)	1.34 (3.48)	12.43 (32.20)
Shaktoolik	251	1.04 (2.70)	0	1.04 (2.70)
Shishmaref	563	16.48 (42.68)	0.0012 (0.0032)	16.48 (42.68)
Shungnak	262	8.92 (23.10)	0.996 (2.58)	9.92 (25.68)
Sitka	4,480	2.64 (6.83)	0.35 (0.90)	2.98 (7.73)
Skagway	967	82.07 (212.57)	4.46 (11.56)	86.53 (224.12)
Sleetmute	86	21.14 (54.76)	5.24 (13.58)	26.39 (68.34)
Solomon	0	3.44 (8.90)	5.24 (13.57)	8.68 (22.47)
South Naknek	79	93.99 (243.44)	2.43 (6.30)	96.42 (249.73)
St. George	102	34.75 (90.00)	147.55 (382.16)	182.31 (472.17)
St. Michael	401	20.02 (51.85)	6.64 (17.19)	26.66 (69.04)
St. Paul	479	39.98 (103.54)	2.32 (6.00)	42.29 (109.54)
Stebbins	556	36.37 (94.20)	1.58 (4.10)	37.95 (98.30)
Stevens Village	78	11.64 (30.14)	1.45 (3.75)	13.09 (33.89)
Stony River	54	3.07 (7.96)	1.78 (4.62)	4.86 (12.58)
Takotna	52	23.81 (61.68)	0	23.81 (61.68)
Tanacross	136	79.37 (205.57)	1.64 (4.25)	81.01 (209.82)
Tanana	246	11.04 (28.60)	4.64 (12.03)	15.68 (40.62)
Tatitlek	88	7.26 (18.81)	2.80 (7.25)	10.06 (26.06)
Tazlina	319	12.28 (31.81)	0.85 (2.21)	13.13 (34.01)
Telida	3	1.68 (4.34)	0	1.68 (4.34)
Teller	229	1.89 (4.89)	0.20 (0.52)	2.09 (5.41)
Tetlin	130	182.99 (473.95)	10.93 (28.32)	193.92 (502.26)
Togiak	817	49.74 (128.82)	83.21 (215.50)	132.94 (344.32)
Toksook Bay	563	14.25 (36.91)	0.029 (0.076)	14.28 (36.99)
Tuluksak	373	2.92 (7.57)	0.097 (0.25)	3.02 (7.82)
Tuntutuliak	382	1.92 (4.96)	0.24 (0.63)	2.16 (5.59)
Tununak	327	60.08 (155.60)	0.24 (0.62)	60.32 (156.22)
Twin Hills	74	22.77 (58.98)	0.27 (0.69)	23.04 (59.67)
Tyonek	177	12.65 (32.77)	0.66 (1.71)	13.31 (34.47)
Ugashik	12	90.24 (233.73)	1.61 (4.17)	91.85 (237.89)
Unalakleet	688	11.87 (30.75)	2.57 (6.66)	14.44 (37.41)
Unalaska	4,376	83.17 (215.42)	2.34 (6.06)	85.51 (221.48)
Venetie	149	12.00 (31.08)	0	12.00 (31.08)
Wainwright	556	17.94 (46.46)	0	17.94 (46.46)
Wales	145	2.53 (6.54)	0	2.53 (6.54)
White Mountain	190	1.80 (4.67)	0.23 (0.60)	2.03 (5.27)
Wrangell	1,189	0.90 (2.34)	0	0.90 (2.34)
Yakutat	662	100.49 (260.26)	3.63 (9.41)	104.12 (269.67)

== Hawaiian home lands ==
Legal/Statistical Area Description	Population (2010)	Area in mi^{2} (km^{2})		
Legal/Statistical Area Description	Population (2010)	Land	Water	Total
Anahola (Agricultural)	257	0.80 (2.08)	0.0020 (0.0052)	0.80 (2.08)
Anahola (Residential)	1,566	5.63 (14.58)	0.029 (0.074)	5.66 (14.65)
East Kapolei	0	0.33 (0.86)	0	0.33 (0.86)
Haiku	0	0.22 (0.58)	0	0.22 (0.58)
Hanapepe	25	0.57 (1.47)	0	0.57 (1.47)
Homuula-Upper Piihonua	3	96.91 (250.99)	0.0054 (0.014)	96.91 (251.00)
Honokaia	0	5.03 (13.02)	0	5.03 (13.02)
Honokowai	0	1.25 (3.23)	0.0054 (0.014)	1.25 (3.25)
Honolulu Makai	13	0.036 (0.094)	0	0.036 (0.094)
Honomu	6	1.19 (3.09)	0.019 (0.048)	1.21 (3.14)
Hoolehua-Palaau	1,292	21.61 (55.96)	0	21.61 (55.96)
Kahikinui	3	37.26 (96.50)	0	37.26 (96.50)
Kakaina-Kumuhau	0	0.032 (0.084)	0	0.032 (0.084)
Kalaeloa	10	0.90 (2.32)	0	0.90 (2.32)
Kalamaula	300	7.95 (20.58)	0	7.95 (20.58)
Kalaupapa	90	1.94 (5.03)	0	1.94 (5.03)
Kalawahine	319	0.073 (0.19)	0	0.073 (0.19)
Kamaoa-Puueo	14	17.59 (45.56)	0	17.59 (45.56)
Kamiloloa-Makakupaia	85	5.08 (13.15)	0.062 (0.16)	5.14 (13.31)
Kamoku-Kapulena	46	7.47 (19.35)	0.0024 (0.0063)	7.47 (19.36)
Kanehili	0	0.11 (0.28)	0	0.11 (0.28)
Kaohe-Olaa	0	1.06 (2.75)	0	1.06 (2.75)
Kapaa	0	0.027 (0.070)	0	0.027 (0.070)
Kapaakea	141	3.06 (7.92)	0	3.06 (7.92)
Kapolei	0	0.14 (0.36)	0	0.14 (0.36)
Kaumana	111	0.028 (0.073)	0	0.028 (0.073)
Kaupea	1,387	0.085 (0.22)	0	0.085 (0.22)
Kawaihae	407	15.99 (41.41)	0	15.99 (41.41)
Keahuolu	0	0.24 (0.61)	0	0.24 (0.61)
Kealakehe	759	1.11 (2.88)	0	1.11 (2.88)
Keanae-Wailua	17	0.39 (1.00)	0	0.39 (1.00)
Keaukaha	1,584	2.64 (6.83)	0	2.64 (6.83)
Kekaha	483	0.081 (0.21)	0	0.081 (0.21)
Keokea	24	3.85 (9.98)	0	3.85 (9.98)
Keoniki	0	0.36 (0.94)	0	0.36 (0.94)
Kewalo	261	0.020 (0.051)	0	0.020 (0.051)
Kolaoa	0	0.75 (1.94)	0	0.75 (1.94)
Lalamilo	64	0.39 (1.00)	0	0.39 (1.00)
Lanai City	85	0.073 (0.19)	0	0.073 (0.19)
Leialii	328	0.12 (0.30)	0	0.12 (0.30)
Lualualei	58	0.71 (1.83)	0.046 (0.12)	0.75 (1.95)
Maili	323	0.14 (0.36)	0	0.14 (0.36)
Makaha Valley	4	0.37 (0.96)	0	0.37 (0.96)
Makuu	113	3.44 (8.90)	0	3.44 (8.90)
Maluohai	1,178	0.058 (0.15)	0	0.058 (0.15)
Moloaa	6	0.54 (1.40)	0	0.54 (1.40)
Nanakuli	5,370	3.61 (9.34)	0.0023 (0.0060)	3.61 (9.35)
Nienie	0	11.09 (28.73)	0	11.09 (28.73)
Panaewa (Agricultural)	664	2.65 (6.86)	0.0073 (0.019)	2.66 (6.88)
Panaewa (Residential)	1,091	0.19 (0.49)	0	0.19 (0.49)
Papakōlea	1,215	0.19 (0.50)	0	0.19 (0.50)
Pauahi	0	0.86 (2.24)	0	0.86 (2.24)
Paukukalo	818	0.097 (0.25)	0	0.097 (0.25)
Pearl City	99	0.037 (0.095)	0	0.037 (0.095)
Piihonua	46	0.0081 (0.021)	0	0.0081 (0.021)
Ponohawaii	21	0.0014 (0.0037)	0	0.0014 (0.0037)
Princess Kahanu Estates	1,128	0.085 (0.22)	0	0.085 (0.22)
Pulehunui	0	0.61 (1.59)	0	0.61 (1.59)
Puukapu	898	18.85 (48.83)	0.019 (0.048)	18.87 (48.87)
South Maui	0	0.35 (0.90)	0	0.35 (0.90)
Ualapue	2	0.64 (1.66)	0	0.64 (1.66)
Upolu	0	0.054 (0.14)	0	0.054 (0.14)
Waiahole	27	0.029 (0.075)	0	0.029 (0.075)
Waiakea	0	2.17 (5.61)	0	2.17 (5.61)
Waianae	2,201	0.58 (1.50)	0	0.58 (1.50)
Waianae Kai	609	0.039 (0.10)	0	0.039 (0.10)
Waiehu	1,330	0.20 (0.53)	0	0.20 (0.53)
Waiku-Hana	0	1.15 (2.98)	0	1.15 (2.98)
Wailau	0	0.10 (0.26)	0	0.10 (0.26)
Wailua	17	0.85 (2.20)	0	0.85 (2.20)
Waimanalo	3,048	3.15 (8.17)	0	3.15 (8.17)
Waimanu	2	0.32 (0.84)	0	0.32 (0.84)
Waimea	0	23.56 (61.02)	0.0050 (0.013)	23.57 (61.04)
Waiohinu	6	0.43 (1.12)	0	0.43 (1.12)
Waiohuli	904	5.76 (14.92)	0	5.76 (14.92)

== Oklahoma tribal statistical areas ==
Legal/Statistical Area Description	Total population (2010)	Native population (2010)	Area in mi^{2} (km^{2})		
Legal/Statistical Area Description	Total population (2010)	Native population (2010)	Land	Water	Total
Caddo-Wichita-Delaware	14,782	2,000	1,027.10 (2,660.18)	10.89 (28.21)	1,037.99 (2,688.39)
Cherokee (*)	505,021	125,000	6,693.73 (17,336.68)	269.48 (697.95)	6,963.21 (18,034.63)
Cheyenne-Arapaho	174,108	13,000	8,116.89 (21,022.65)	59.37 (153.76)	8,176.26 (21,176.42)
Chickasaw (*)	302,861	41,000	7,270.28 (18,829.94)	188.24 (487.55)	7,458.52 (19,317.49)
Choctaw (*)	233,126	48,000	10,602.33 (27,459.92)	283.99 (735.53)	10,886.32 (28,195.45)
Citizen Potawatomi Nation-Absentee Shawnee	117,911	13,000	1,116.67 (2,892.15)	17.17 (44.46)	1,133.83 (2,936.61)
Muscogee (*)	758,622	99,000	4,628.71 (11,988.31)	157.34 (407.50)	4,786.05 (12,395.81)
Muscogee/Seminole joint-use	2,041	500	65.19 (168.83)	0.32 (0.82)	65.50 (169.65)
Eastern Shawnee	752		20.35 (52.70)	0.38 (0.99)	20.73 (53.69)
Iowa	6,608		356.67 (923.76)	3.10 (8.02)	359.76 (931.78)
Kaw	6,130		476.26 (1,233.51)	20.59 (53.33)	496.85 (1,286.83)
Kaw/Ponca joint-use	27,111		108.73 (281.60)	1.71 (4.42)	110.43 (286.02)
Kickapoo	19,921		249.55 (646.34)	2.51 (6.50)	252.06 (652.83)
Kiowa-Comanche-Apache-Fort Sill Apache	197,781	16,000	6,353.02 (16,454.25)	75.92 (196.64)	6,428.94 (16,650.89)
Kiowa-Comanche-Apache-Ft Sill Apache/Caddo-Wichita-Delaware joint-use	11,621	5,000	192.77 (499.26)	0.60 (1.56)	193.37 (500.82)
Miami (*)	268		27.71 (71.77)	0.36 (0.92)	28.07 (72.69)
Miami/Peoria joint-use (*)	4,401		12.44 (32.22)	0.17 (0.44)	12.61 (32.66)
Modoc	292		6.24 (16.17)	0	6.24 (16.17)
Otoe-Missouria	814		192.32 (498.11)	9.56 (24.76)	201.89 (522.88)
Ottawa (*)	5,919		23.41 (60.62)	0.58 (1.49)	23.98 (62.11)
Pawnee	16,437		514.66 (1,332.96)	21.95 (56.85)	536.61 (1,389.81)
Peoria (*)	5,019		39.30 (101.79)	0.14 (0.36)	39.44 (102.16)
Ponca	2,100		163.63 (423.81)	3.32 (8.59)	166.95 (432.39)
Quapaw (*)	5,357		86.38 (223.73)	0.47 (1.23)	86.86 (224.96)
Sac and Fox	57,450	8,300	739.15 (1,914.40)	11.02 (28.53)	750.17 (1,942.94)
Seminole (*)	23,441	5,700	567.65 (1,470.21)	7.32 (18.96)	574.97 (1,489.17)
Seneca-Cayuga	4,294		72.35 (187.38)	10.92 (28.27)	83.26 (215.65)
Tonkawa	4,056		142.51 (369.10)	1.05 (2.73)	143.56 (371.83)
Wyandotte (*)	1,672		32.59 (84.41)	1.52 (3.94)	34.12 (88.36)

(*) declared reservations under McGirt v. Oklahoma

== State-recognized reservations ==
A state designated American Indian reservation is the land area designated by a state for state-recognized American Indian tribes who lack federal recognition.

Legal/Statistical Area Description	State	Population (2010)	Area in mi^{2} (km^{2})		
Legal/Statistical Area Description	State	Population (2010)	Land	Water	Total
Golden Hill Paugussett Reservation	CT	4	0.15 (0.40)	0	0.15 (0.40)
Hassanamisco Reservation	MA	2	0.0081 (0.021)	0	0.0081 (0.021)
MOWA Choctaw Reservation	AL	87	1.04 (2.69)	0	1.04 (2.69)
Paucatuck Eastern Pequot Reservation	CT	30	0.36 (0.92)	0.023 (0.059)	0.38 (0.98)
Schaghticoke Reservation	CT	9	0.43 (1.12)	0	0.43 (1.12)
Tama Reservation	GA	9	0.14 (0.37)	0.00081 (0.0021)	0.14 (0.37)
Poospatuck Reservation	NY	324	0.11 (0.29)	0.058 (0.15)	0.17 (0.44)

== State designated tribal statistical areas ==
State Designated Tribal Statistical Areas are geographical areas the United States Census Bureau uses to track demographic data. These areas have a substantial concentration of members of tribes that are State recognized but not Federally recognized and do not have a reservation or off-reservation trust land.

Legal/Statistical Area Description	State(s)	Population (2010)	Area in mi^{2} (km^{2})		
Legal/Statistical Area Description	State(s)	Population (2010)	Land	Water	Total
Adais Caddo	LA	2,517	146.27 (378.85)	1.84 (4.77)	148.12 (383.62)
Apache Choctaw	LA	6,000	85.61 (221.73)	1.02 (2.63)	86.63 (224.37)
Beaver Creek	SC	1,153	25.07 (64.94)	0.10 (0.27)	25.17 (65.20)
Cher-O-Creek	AL	83,668	322.25 (834.62)	1.12 (2.89)	323.37 (837.52)
Cherokee Tribe of Northeast Alabama	AL	12,732	33.97 (87.99)	0.15 (0.38)	34.12 (88.37)
Chickahominy	VA	3,443	51.85 (134.29)	0.025 (0.065)	51.88 (134.36)
Clifton Choctaw	LA	415	48.81 (126.42)	0.10 (0.27)	48.92 (126.70)
Coharie Intra-tribal Council, Inc.	NC	56,432	241.59 (625.71)	3.05 (7.89)	244.63 (633.60)
Eastern Chickahominy	VA	179	2.23 (5.78)	0	2.23 (5.78)
Echota Cherokee	AL	53,622	509.06 (1,318.46)	3.02 (7.83)	512.08 (1,326.29)
Four Winds Cherokee	LA	30,286	218.89 (566.91)	2.00 (5.17)	220.88 (572.08)
Haliwa-Saponi	NC	8,102	177.03 (458.50)	0.46 (1.19)	177.49 (459.69)
Lenape Indian Tribe of Delaware	DE	545	2.25 (5.82)	0	2.25 (5.82)
Lumbee Tribe of North Carolina	NC	490,899	1,817.16 (4,706.43)	8.51 (22.04)	1,825.67 (4,728.46)
MaChis Lower Creek	AL	21,818	668.20 (1,730.64)	2.58 (6.67)	670.78 (1,737.31)
Meherrin	NC	7,956	32.62 (84.49)	0.45 (1.16)	33.07 (85.65)
Nanticoke Indian Association	DE	7,059	27.69 (71.72)	0.085 (0.22)	27.78 (71.95)
Nanticoke Lenni-Lenape Tribal Nation	NJ	5,652	19.16 (49.62)	0.25 (0.64)	19.41 (50.26)
Occaneechi-Saponi	NC	8,615	93.61 (242.45)	1.68 (4.35)	95.29 (246.80)
Pee Dee	SC	2,915	50.97 (132.02)	0.71 (1.83)	51.68 (133.86)
Ramapough	NJ	847	7.15 (18.53)	0.10 (0.26)	7.25 (18.79)
Santee	SC	492	7.68 (19.89)	0	7.68 (19.89)
Sappony	NC	2,372	43.00 (111.36)	4.08 (10.56)	47.07 (121.91)
Star Muskogee Creek	AL	5,377	112.64 (291.73)	0.31 (0.81)	112.95 (292.54)
United Cherokee Ani-Yun-Wiya Nation	AL	5,869	8.43 (21.84)	0.83 (2.15)	9.26 (23.99)
United Houma Nation	LA	203,077	582.01 (1,507.40)	24.89 (64.46)	606.90 (1,571.86)
Upper South Carolina Pee Dee	SC	1,325	39.38 (101.99)	0.035 (0.091)	39.41 (102.08)
Waccamaw	SC	24	1.28 (3.32)	0.0042 (0.011)	1.29 (3.33)
Waccamaw Siouan	NC	2,113	45.36 (117.47)	0.033 (0.085)	45.39 (117.56)
Wassamasaw	SC	2,011	8.84 (22.90)	0	8.84 (22.90)

== Tribal designated statistical areas ==
A tribal designated statistical area is a statistical entity identified and delineated for the Census Bureau by a federally recognized American Indian tribe that does not currently have a federally established Indian reservation.

Legal/Statistical Area Description	State(s)	Population (2010)	Area in mi^{2} (km^{2})		
Legal/Statistical Area Description	State(s)	Population (2010)	Land	Water	Total
Cayuga Nation	NY	2,715	37.85 (98.02)	35.62 (92.26)	73.47 (190.29)
Ione Band of Miwok	CA	5	2.12 (5.49)	0	2.12 (5.49)
Samish	WA	36,727	224.63 (581.80)	543.56 (1,407.81)	768.20 (1,989.62)

== See also ==
United States

- List of federally recognized tribes
- List of federally recognized tribes by state
- State recognized tribes in the United States
- List of organizations that self-identify as Native American tribes
- Native Americans in the United States
- List of Alaska Native tribal entities
- List of historical Indian reservations in the United States
- National Park Service Native American Heritage Sites
- Outline of United States federal Indian law and policy
- Off-reservation trust land
- Native Americans and reservation inequality

Canada

- List of First Nations governments
- List of First Nations peoples
- List of Indian reserves in Canada

== Sources ==
- "Geographic Terms and Concepts - American Indian, Alaska Native, and Native Hawaiian Areas". U.S. Census Bureau. 2010.
