= Papakōlea Beach =

Green sand beach in Kaʻū district, Hawai'i, US

Coordinates: 18°56′11″N 155°38′47″W

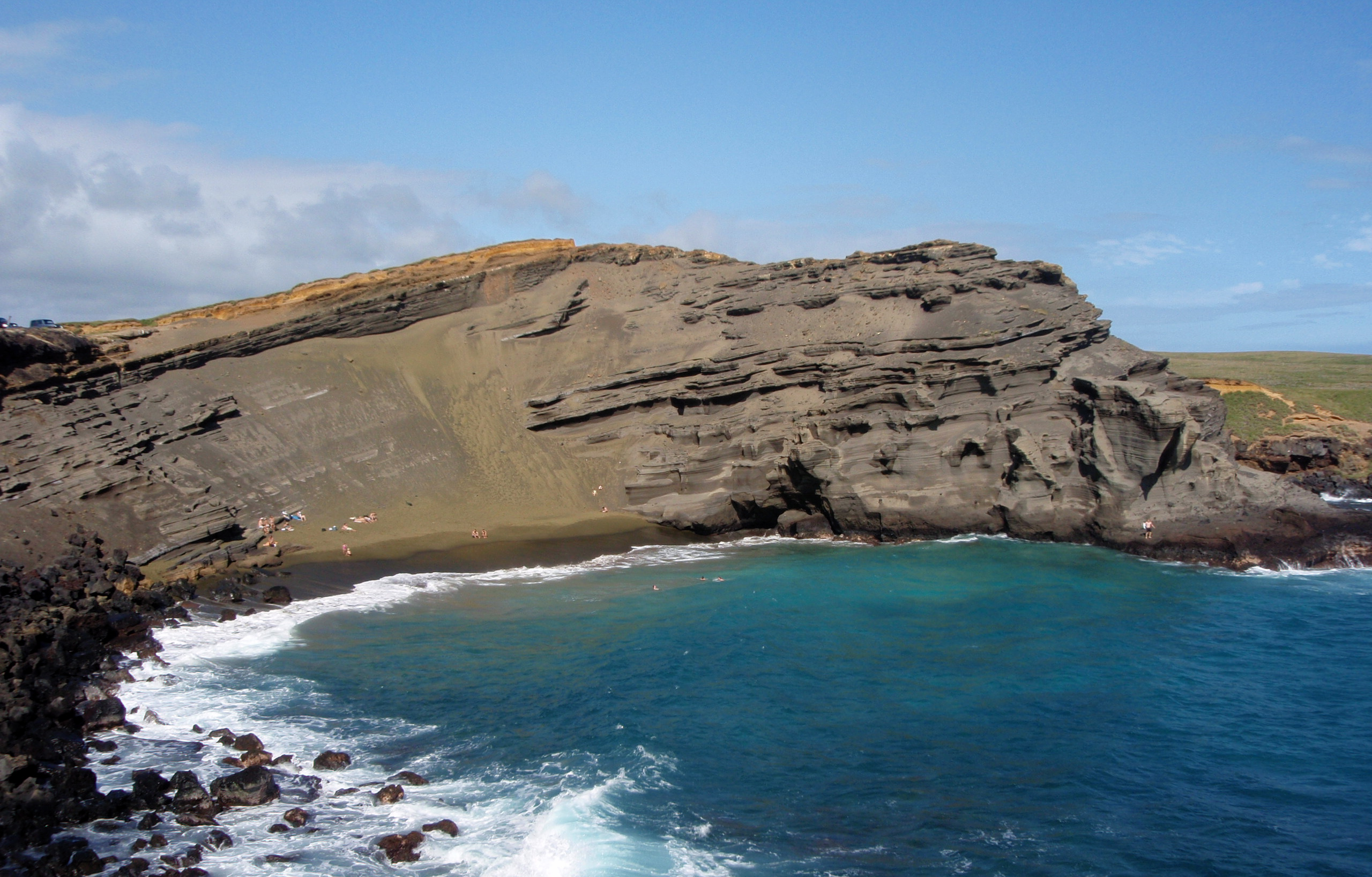
Looking over Papakolea Beach

Papakōlea Beach (also known as Green Sand Beach or Mahana Beach) is a green sand beach located near South Point, in the Kaʻū district of the island of Hawaiʻi. It is one of only two green sand beaches in the world, the other being Punta Cormorant on Floreana Island in the Galapagos Islands It gets its distinctive coloring from olivine sand eroded out of the enclosing volcanic cone (tuff ring).

== Characteristics ==
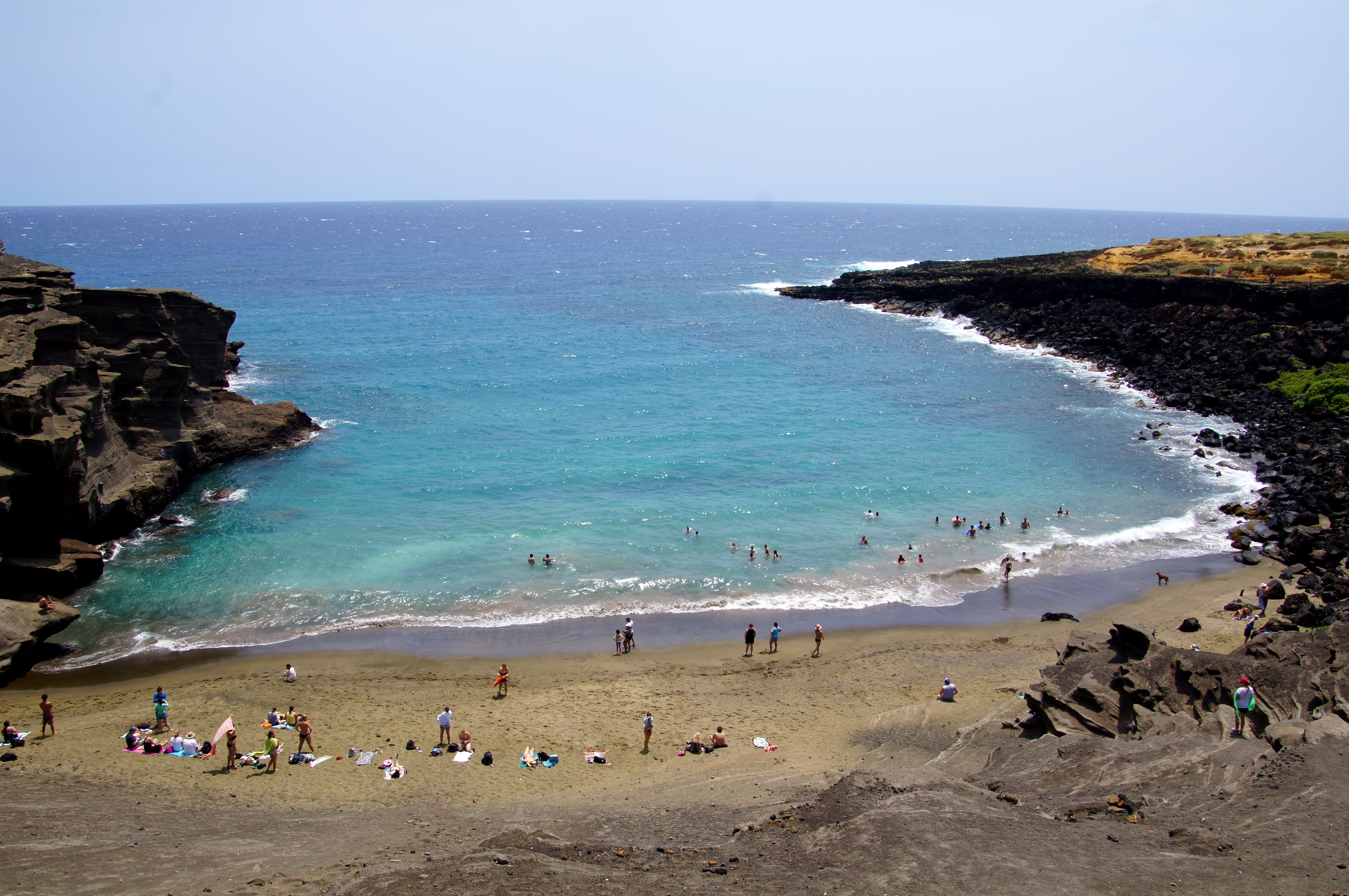
Climbing down to the beach requires a certain level of mobility.

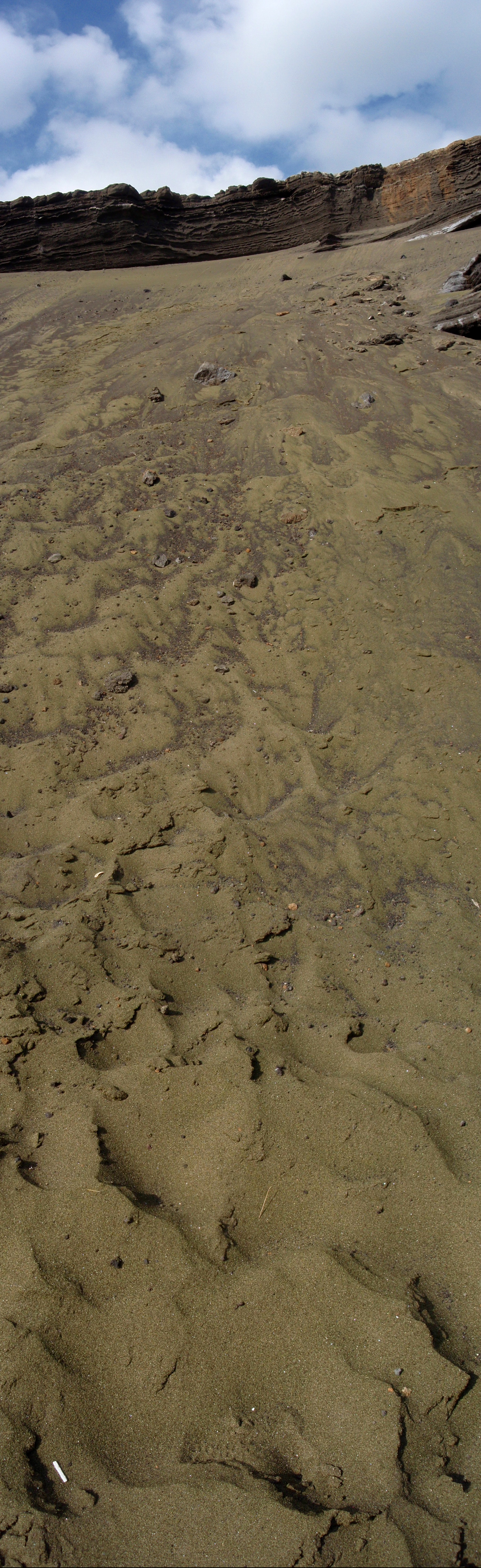
The green sand is more abundant at the bottom of the tuff ring.

Papakōlea Beach is located in a bay half circled by Puʻu Mahana, a tuff ring formed over 49,000 years ago and associated with the southwest rift of Mauna Loa. Unlike cinder cones, tuff rings consist mostly of volcanic ash produced by violent interactions of magma with groundwater (Diamond Head, on the Island of Oahu, is another example of a tuff ring). Since its last eruption, the tuff ring has partially collapsed and been partially eroded by the ocean. The beach is sometimes named after the tuff ring, and sometimes after the area of land called Papakōlea, which comes from papa kōlea, which means plover flats in the Hawaiian language. Papakōlea is the area near the crater where Pacific golden plovers (Pluvialis fulva) are sometimes seen in winter.

The fragmented volcanic material (pyroclastics) of the tuff ring contains olivine, a silicate mineral containing iron and magnesium, also known as peridot when of gem quality. Olivine is a common mineral component of lava and is one of the first crystals to form as magma cools. Olivine is locally known as "Hawaiian Diamond" and is notably found in Oʻahu's famous Diamond Head landmark. The source of the green coloration of the beach sands is due to the olivine crystals (whose green color is due to ferrous iron) which are winnowed from the eroding headland by the action of the sea. Olivine, being denser than the enclosing ash matrix, tends to accumulate on the beach whereas the less dense volcanic sand is swept out to sea. Elsewhere on the Big Island, olivine is enclosed in lava rock, rather than volcanic ash, so the olivine is not easily freed from the enclosing rock and tends to weather away rather than accumulate and concentrate as beach sand.

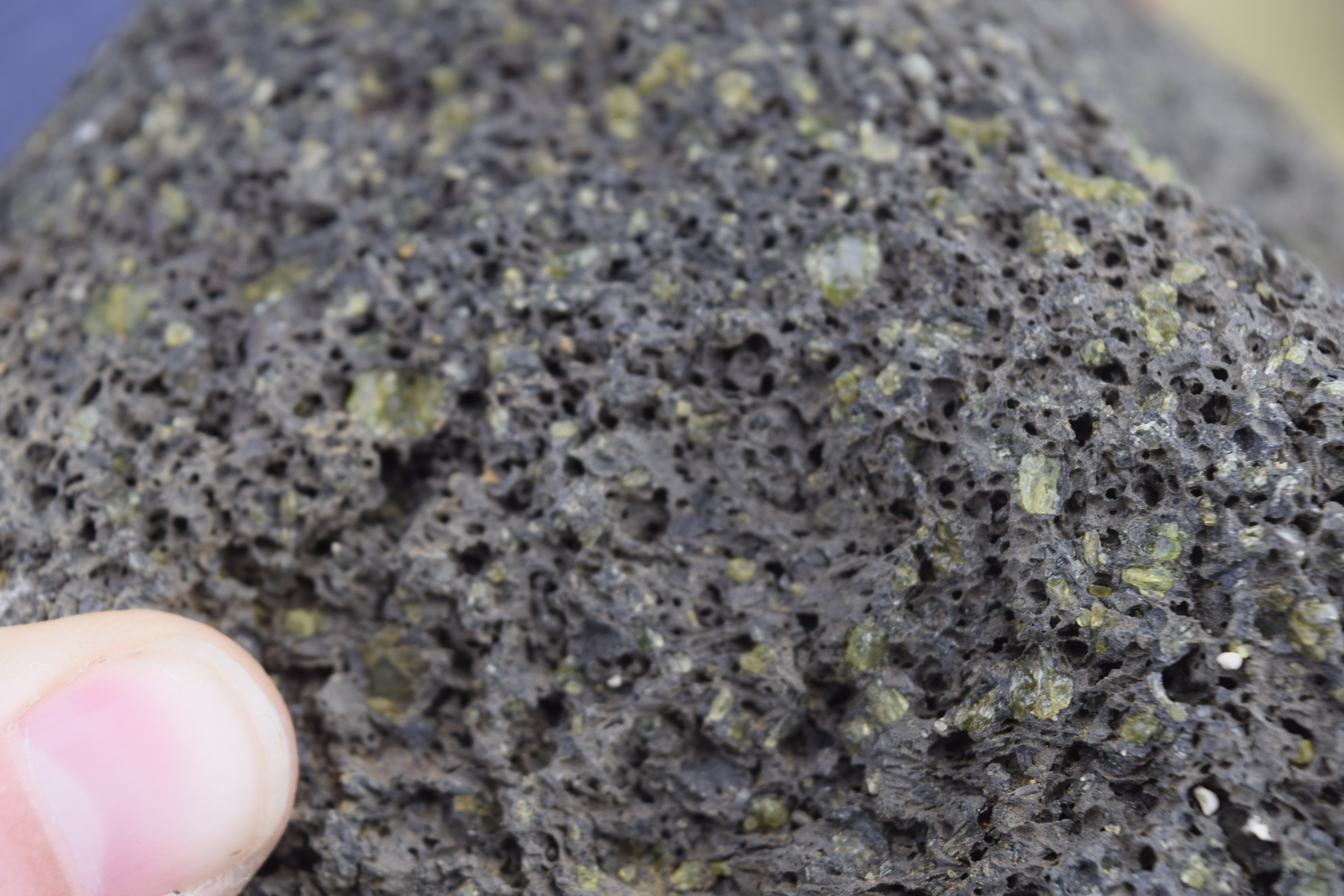
Olivine Crystals in Lava Rock. This is the source of the green sand found on the green sand beach

Although these crystals are eventually broken down by weathering and chemical action and washed away, the constant erosion of the tuff ring ensures a steady supply of sand for the foreseeable future. Eventually, however, the supply will run out and the beach will look like any other.

The formation of the tuff ring is currently a point of contention, with some arguing that lava flowing into the sea was suddenly cooled, forming an edifice on the coastline (a littoral cone) and others noting that the cone was most likely too far away from the ocean at the time of formation (sea level was much lower during the last Ice Age, when the cone formed) to make such an event possible. Regardless of how it was formed, according to the United States Geological Survey, the last lava flow in the area ended over 10,000 years ago, making the area one of the more stable features in the geologically turbulent Kaʻū region. As such, the geologic history of the site can be seen in the rock surrounding the beach and bay, which are not subject to erosion and thus display geologic layers formed by previous eruptions, lava flows, and other volcanic events. In addition, the current patterns of erosion can be seen first-hand, as only the portions at the bottom of the tuff ring collapse have been subject to the waves and turned into green sand; the remaining portions appear gray.

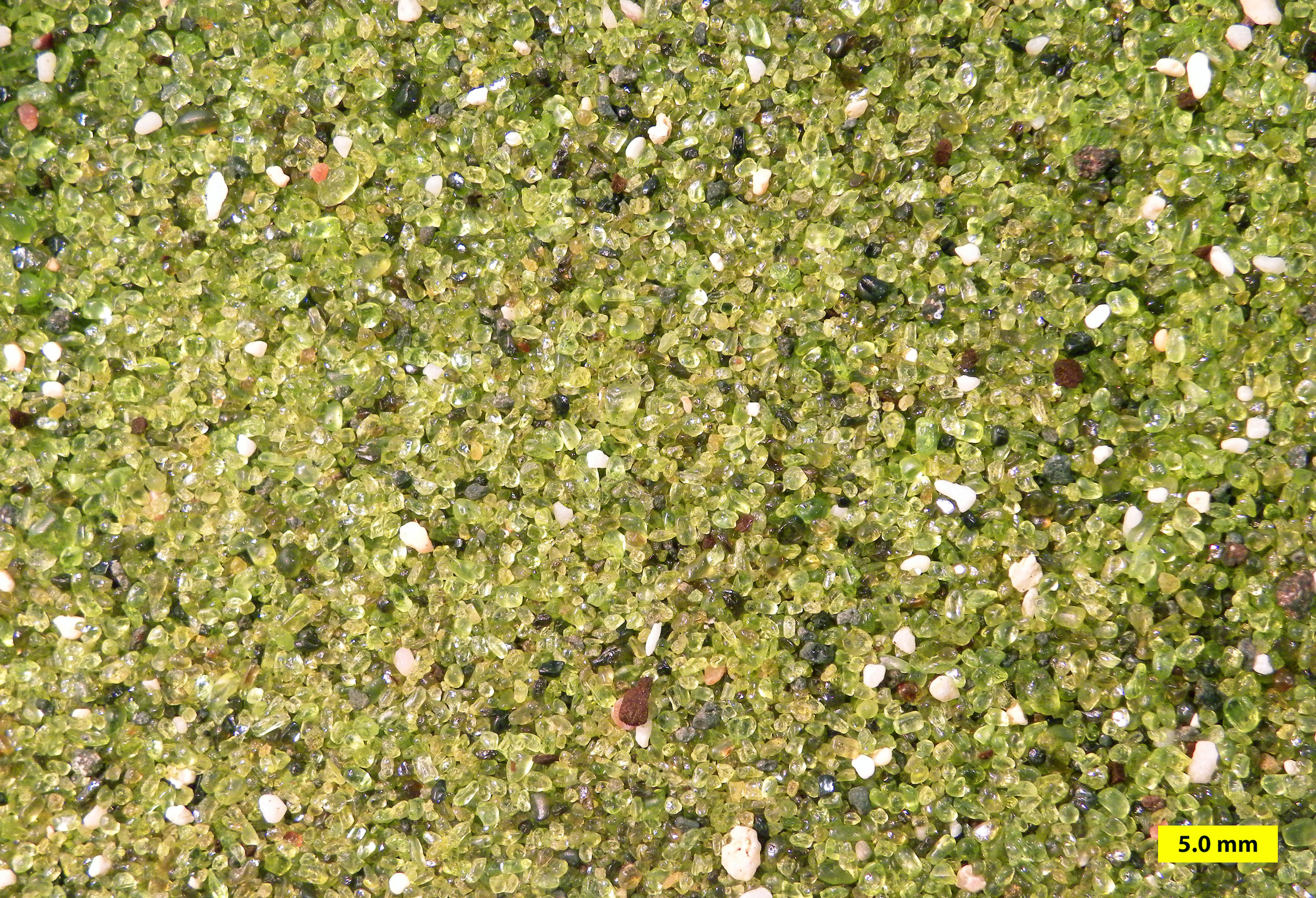
Close view of olivine-rich sand found on the beach

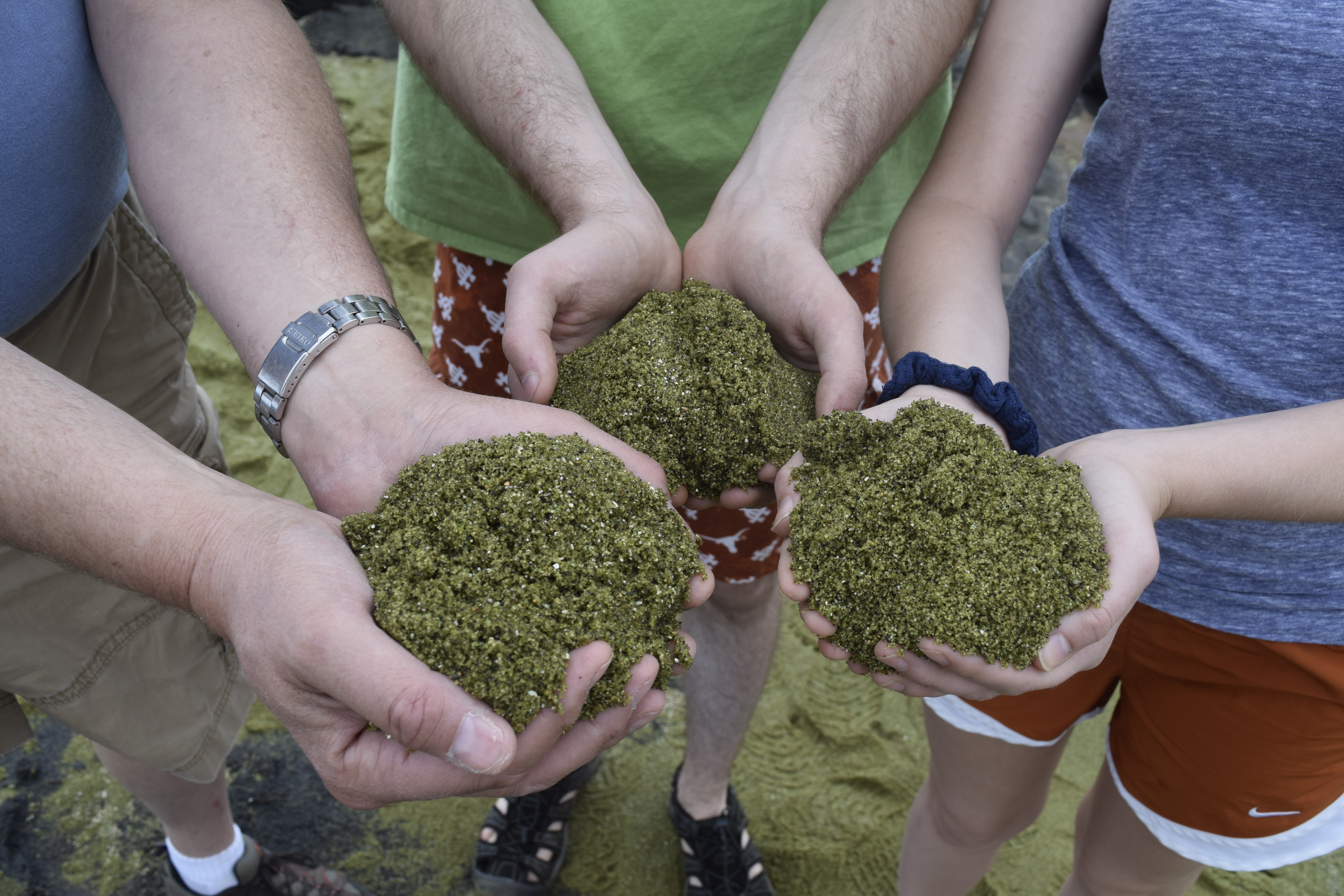
Green Sand closeup view, for color reference

== Access ==
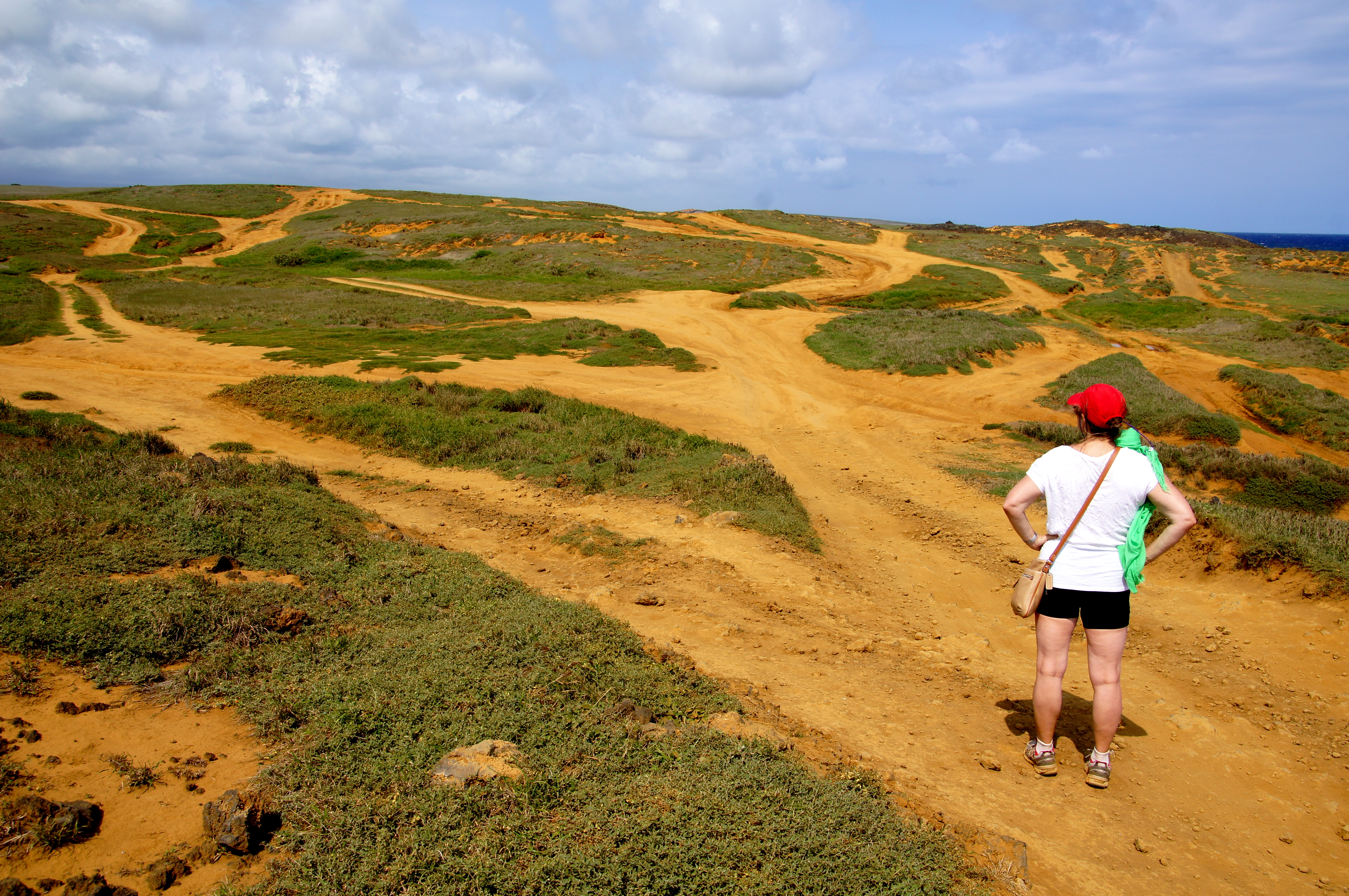
Looking east over the many rough path choices on the way to Papakolea Beach

The beach is located about 3 miles (5 km) east of Ka Lae (known as South Point) on the island of Hawaiʻi. It is surrounded by pasturelands and is only legally accessible by foot. The paths are rugged due to both illegal vehicular traffic and erosion. The land owner, the Department of Hawaiian Home Lands, has attempted to restrict vehicular traffic in the area since 2016. However, illegal vehicular traffic has continued despite the measures. The vehicles have created ruts in the soil that reach well over 8 feet deep as shown in the photo below from December 20, 2020.

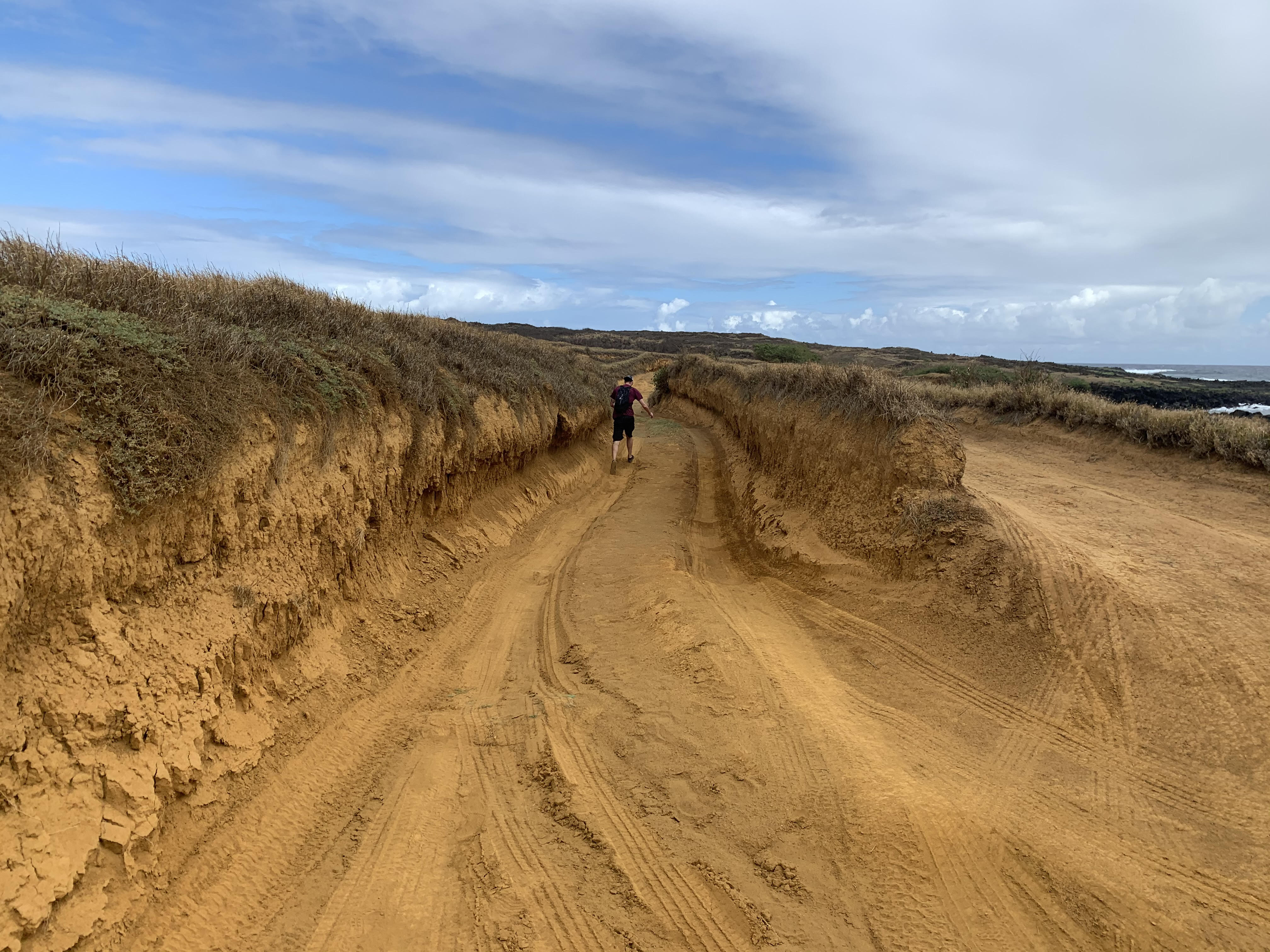
6 ft 8 in (2.03 m) man traversing the ruts created by vehicles

In order to reach the beach after crossing the pastureland, one has to climb down the tuff ring.

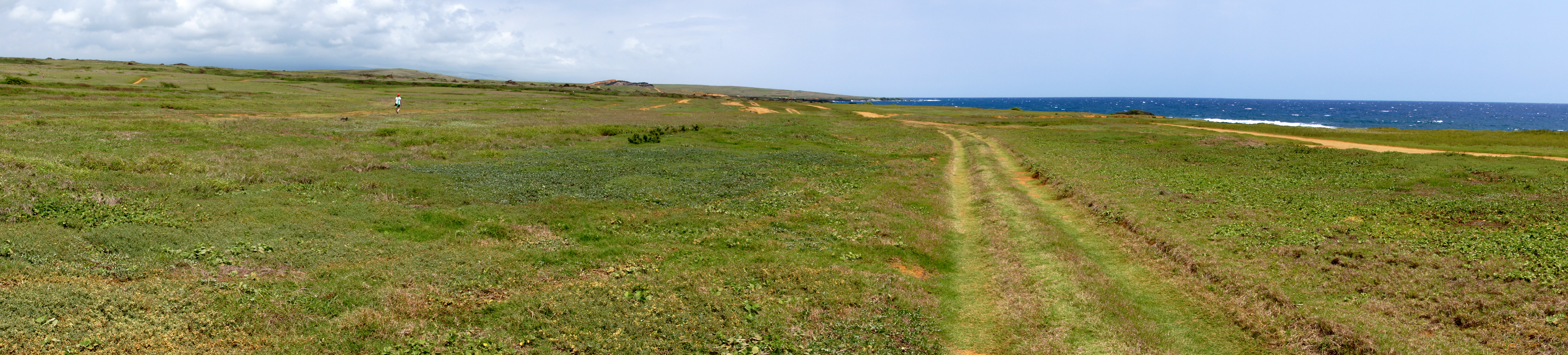
Hiking to the Green Sands Beach from the west across pastureland. The rim of its tuff ring is just left of the photo's center.

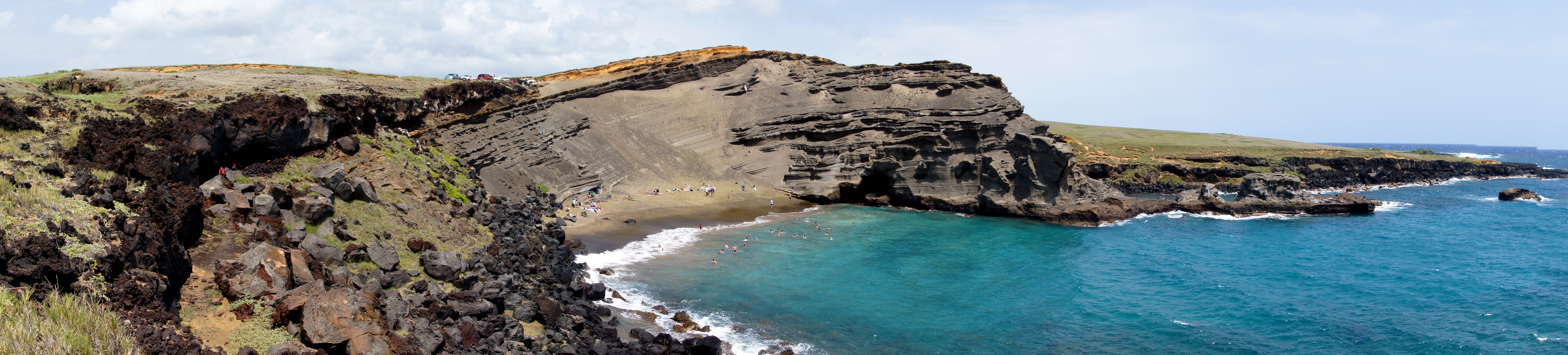
A first glimpse of Papakolea Beach after a long hike from the parking area

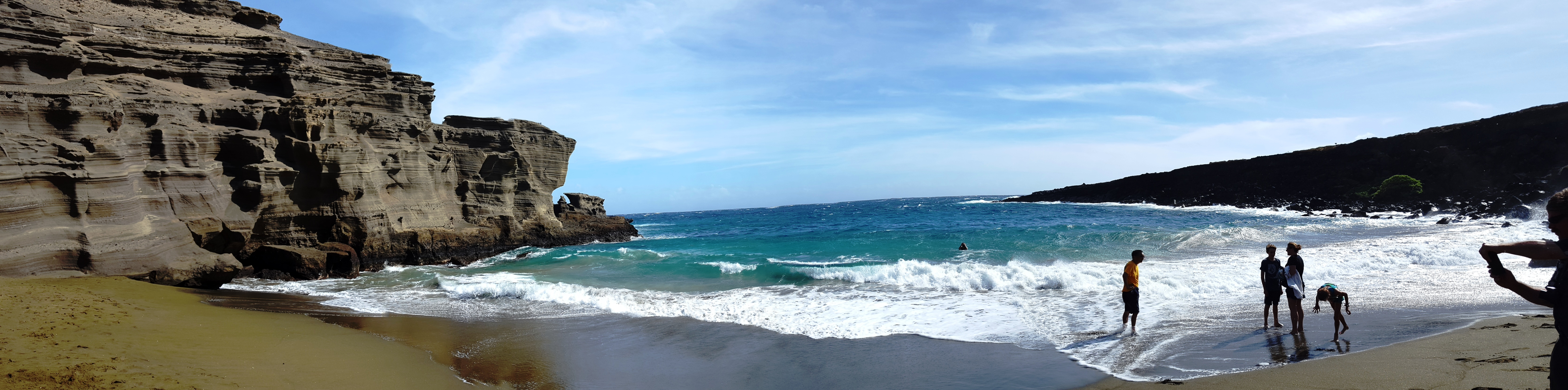
Panoramic view of the Papakōlea Beach as seen from the green sands on the beach.

== See also ==
- Papakōlea
