= Yerington Paiute Tribe of the Yerington Colony and Campbell Ranch =

Native American tribe

Yerington Paiute
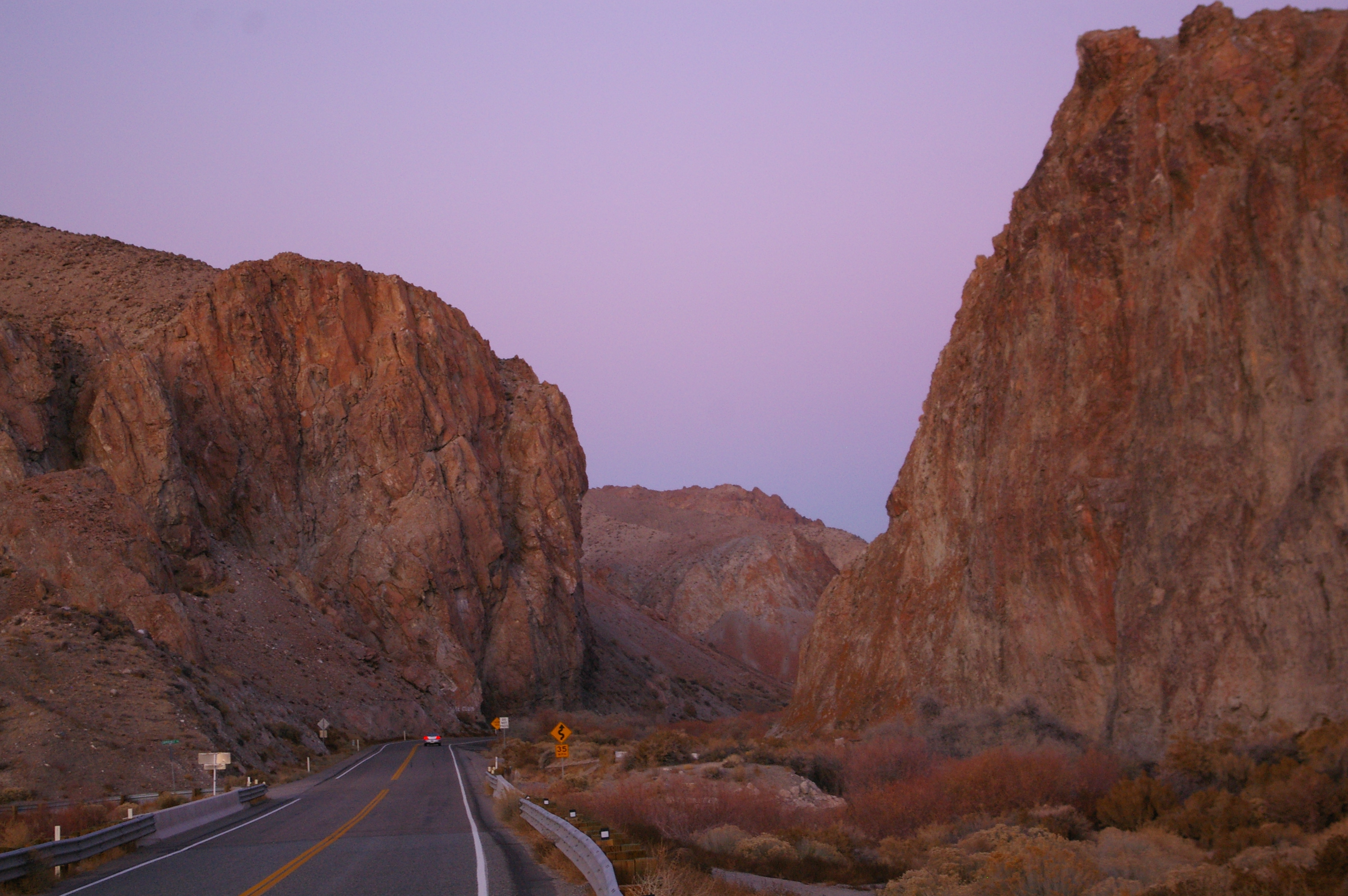
- Wilson Canyon near Yerington, Nevada

Total population
- 1,273 enrolled members

Regions with significant populations
- United States (Nevada)

Languages
- Northern Paiute language, English

Religion
- Native American Church, Sun Dance, traditional tribal religion, Christianity

Related ethnic groups
- other Northern Paiute people

The Yerington Paiute Tribe of the Yerington Colony and Campbell Ranch is a federally recognized tribe of Northern Paiute Indians in western Nevada.

== Reservation ==
Location of the Yerington Reservation in Nevada

The Yerington Paiute Tribe has a reservation, the Yerington Reservation and Trust Lands, in Lyon County, Nevada. The reservation was established in 1916 and 1936 and is 1,653 acres (6.69 km^{2}) large. In 1990, 354 tribal members lived on the reservation. The tribe has 1,273 enrolled members in 2026. The larger Campbell Ranch section is located at 39°04′42″N 119°12′30″W north of Yerington, while the smaller Yerington Colony section is located at 38°58′51″N 119°10′15″W, within the city limits of Yerington.

The Native name for the tribe refers to two Northern Paiute bands known as, Taboose-ddukaka ("Nut Grass Eaters" or "Grass Bulb Eaters") and Padutse-ddukaka ("Wild Onion Eaters").

== Recent history ==
In 1937, the Yerington Paiute Tribe ratified its constitution and bylaws. They gained federal recognition under the 1934 Indian Reorganization Act.

== Government ==
The Yerington Paiute Tribe of Nevada's tribal headquarters is located in Yerington, Nevada. The tribe is governed by a tribal council. The most recent administration included the following:

- Tribal Chairperson: Ginny Hatch
- Vice Chairperson: Linda Howard
- Secretary of Record: Renee Rogers
- Council Member: Melissa Castillo
- Council Member: Thomas Foster
- Council Member: Elwood Emm
- Council Member: Marlene Brown-Hussey
- Council Member: Laurie Thom.

The Yerington Paiutes operate their own Health Clinic, Wellness Center, Tax and TERO Services, Housing Authority, education program, environmental program (overseeing air and water quality and wetlands), police force, USDA Commodities program, and social services.

== Economic development ==
The tribe owns and operates the Arrowhead Market, a fuel and convenience store in Yerington, Bridge Market and Smokeshop, a tobacco and convenience store, Arrowhead Storage, a storage unit facility, Pesha Numma, a cannabis store, and Arrowhead Ranch, which grows mainly alfalfa.
