= Papakōlea =

Hawaiian township

- Reservation
- Location within Hawaii
- Coordinates: 21.315°N 157.838°W
- Elevation: 145 m (476 ft)

Papakōlea is a small community located in Honolulu, Hawaii, US. It is notable for being sloped on the Punchbowl Crater. It is also one of the Hawaiian homestead lands, created by the Hawaiian Homes Commission Act of 1921. The area is primarily residential.
