= San Felipe Indian Reservation =

Coordinates: 35.4313°N 106.4484°W

Location of San Felipe Pueblo

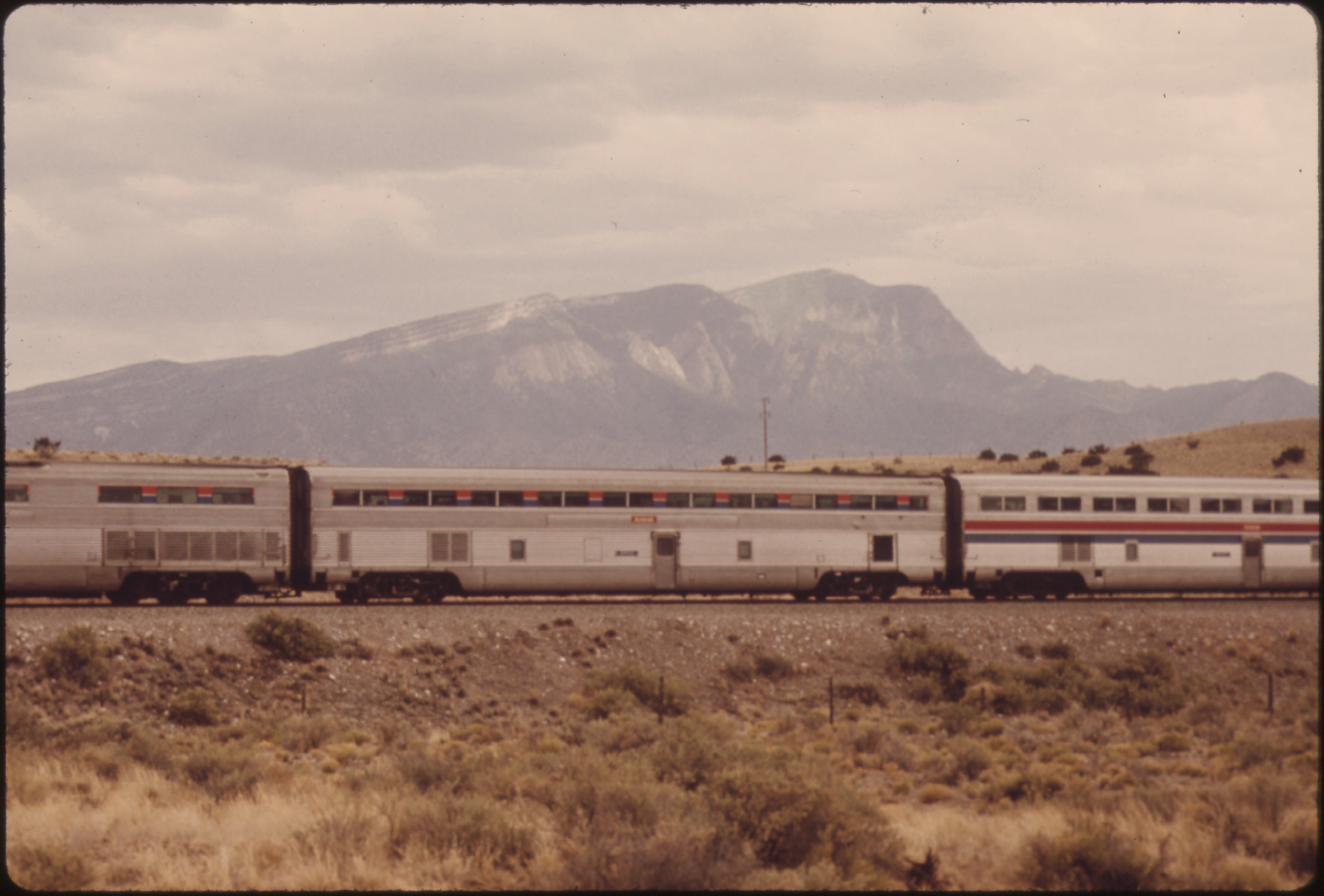
Amtrak's Southwest Limited crosses the reservation in 1974.

The San Felipe Pueblo (Eastern Keres: Katishtya) is the homeland of a branch of the Native American Pueblo people. It lies in Sandoval County, New Mexico, United States, just north of the city of Albuquerque. It has a land area of 205.852 km² (79.48 sq mi), and reported a resident population of 3,686 persons as of the 2020 census. It two largest communities are San Felipe Pueblo and Algodones.
