= Hawaiian home land =

Area held in trust for Native Hawaiians by the state of Hawaii

A Hawaiian home land is an area held in trust for Native Hawaiians by the state of Hawaii under the Hawaiian Homes Commission Act of 1920.

== History ==
Upon the 1893 overthrow of the Hawaiian Kingdom, the idea for "Hawaiian Homelands" was first born. In his testimony before Congress regarding the Hawaiian Islands on January 3, 1894, William Alexander reported:

President Dole [of the Republic of Hawaii] and his colleagues have elaborated a plan for giving the Kanakas homesteads out of the Crown lands, not transferable, and further this condition of occupation.

In 1921, the federal government of the United States set aside approximately 200,000 acres (810 km^{2}) in the Territory of Hawaii as a land trust for homesteading by Native Hawaiians. The law mandating this, passed by the U.S. Congress on July 9, 1921, was called the "Hawaiian Homes Commission Act" (HHCA) and, with amendments, is still in effect today. The act is often also attributed to the year 1920, when it was written. The avowed purpose of the Hawaiian Homes Commission Act was to rehabilitate Native Hawaiians, particularly in returning them to the land to maintain traditional ties to the land. The Hawaiian politicians who testified in favor of the act specifically referred to the devastation of the Hawaiian population and the loss of the land, and the need for Hawaiians to be able to grow traditional crops such as kalo (taro).

The Hawaiian Homes Commission Act included a controversial definition of "Native Hawaiians" as persons with 50% or more Hawaiian blood. Jonah Kūhiō Kalanianaʻole, the territory's non-voting delegate to Congress, wanted a blood quantum of no less than 1/32.

Primary responsibility for administering the trust has rested with:

- 1921–1960: the Hawaiian Homes Commission (a federal agency)
- 1960–present: the Department of Hawaiian Home Lands (DHHL, a state agency)

That is, responsibility was transferred to the state level after Hawaii became a state in 1959. The U.S. federal government nonetheless retains significant oversight responsibilities, including the exclusive right to sue for breach of trust.

== Purpose ==
Section 101, "Purpose", of the Hawaiian Homes Commission Act explains the aims of the Hawaiian Homelands program as follows:

(a) ... to enable native Hawaiians to return to their lands in order to fully support self-sufficiency for native Hawaiians and the self-determination of native Hawaiians in the administration of this Act, and the preservation of the values, traditions, and culture of native Hawaiians.
(b) The principal purposes of this Act include but are not limited to:

(1) Establishing a permanent land base for the benefit and use of native Hawaiians, upon which they may live, farm, ranch, and otherwise engage in commercial or industrial or any other activities as authorized in this Act;
(2) Placing native Hawaiians on the lands set aside under this Act in a prompt and efficient manner and assuring long-term tenancy to beneficiaries of this Act and their successors;
(3) Preventing alienation of the fee title to the lands set aside under this Act so that these lands will always be held in trust for continued use by native Hawaiians in perpetuity;
(4) Providing adequate amounts of water and supporting infrastructure, so that homestead lands will always be usable and accessible; and
(5) Providing financial support and technical assistance to native Hawaiian beneficiaries of this Act so that by pursuing strategies to enhance economic self-sufficiency and promote community-based development, the traditions, culture and quality of life of native Hawaiians shall be forever self-sustaining.

(c) In recognition of the solemn trust created by this Act, and the historical government to government relationship between the United States and Kingdom of Hawaii, the United States and the State of Hawaii hereby acknowledge the trust established under this Act and affirm their fiduciary duty to faithfully administer the provisions of this Act on behalf of the native Hawaiian beneficiaries of the Act.
(d) Nothing in this Act shall be construed to:

(1) Affect the rights of the descendants of the indigenous citizens of the Kingdom of Hawaii to seek redress of any wrongful activities associated with the overthrow of the Kingdom of Hawaii; or
(2) Alter the obligations of the United States and the State of Hawaii to carry out their public trust responsibilities under section 5 of the Admission Act to native Hawaiians and other descendants of the indigenous citizens of the Kingdom of Hawaii. [L 1990, c 349, §1]

== List ==
- Anahola-Kamalomalo
- Auwaiolimu-Kalawahine-Kewalo-Papakolea
- Hanapēpē
- Hoolehua-Palaau
- Honokaia
- Honokōhau
- Honomu-Kuhua
- Humuula
- Kahikinui
- Kalamaula
- Kalaoa
- Kalaupapa
- Kamaoa-Puueo
- Kamiloloa
- Kamoku-Kapulena
- Kaniohale
- Kapaʻa
- Kapaakea
- Kapālama
- Kapolei
- Kaumana
- Kawaihae
- Keʻanae
- Kealakehe
- Keaukaha
- Kekaha
- Keoniki
- Kula
- Lāhainā
- Lalamilo
- Lualualei
- Makakupia
- Makuu
- Mōʻiliʻili
- Moloaa
- Nānākuli
- Nienie
- Olaa
- Panaewa
- Pauahi
- Paukukalo
- Pihonua
- Ponohawai
- Princess Kahanu Estates Association
- Puukapu
- Puʻunēnē
- Puna
- Shafter Flats
- ʻUalapuʻe
- Ulupalakua
- Waiʻanae
- Waiʻōhinu
- Waiākea
- Waiehu
- Waikoloa-Waialeale
- Wailau
- Wailua
- Wailuā
- Wailuku
- Waimānalo
- Waimanu
- Waimea

== See also ==
- Indian reservation
- Indian reserve, Canada
- Ranchería
- Rancherie, Canada
- Right to homeland
- Aboriginal title
- Politics of Hawaii
