= List of films and television shows shot in Northern California =

While the California film industry is based in Los Angeles, over the years many films have shot in Northern California, looking for rural towns, forests, rivers and beaches that can double for New England and even Scotland. Hollywood has been filming in California's northern most 18 counties since at least 1916 and the region has played host to some of Hollywood's biggest films, including The Adventures of Robin Hood, Gone with the Wind, Return of the Jedi, E.T. the Extra-Terrestrial, and Stand by Me.

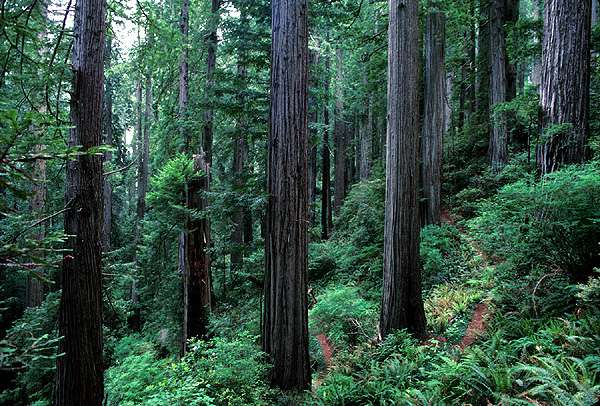
Redwood forests on private land near Smith River, California, and at the Chetham Grove section of Grizzly Creek Redwoods State Park were used to film the forests of Endor in Return of the Jedi.

This list of films shot is organized first by county, and then chronologically by year. Some films may appear more than once if they were shot in more than one county.

== Del Norte County ==
Film	Year	Location(s)	Ref.
The Last of the Mohicans	1936	Lake Earl	
Green Dolphin Street	1947	Klamath River	
Patterson–Gimlin film	1967	Bluff Creek, Six Rivers National Forest	
Petulia	1968	Klamath	
E.T. the Extra-Terrestrial	1982	Fort Dick, Crescent City	
Star Wars: Return of the Jedi	1983	Smith River, Fort Dick, Jedediah Smith Redwoods State Park	
The Final Terror	1983	Jedediah Smith Redwoods State Park	
Tim McGraw: Not a Moment Too Soon	1994	Crescent City	
Dead Man	1995	Klamath River	
Lockdown: Gangland (TV Series)	2006	Pelican Bay State Prison	
Lockup: Raw (TV Series)	2008	Pelican Bay State Prison	
Love in the Time of Monsters	2014	Gasquet, Klamath	
Woodshock	2017	Del Norte County	
Bird Box	2018	Smith River	
Call of the Wild	2020	Smith River	
She's in Portland	2020	Klamath, Crescent City	

== Siskiyou County ==
Film	Year	Location(s)	Ref.
Jacques of the Silver North	1919	Mt. Shasta	
Murder in the Private Car	1934	Dunsmuir	
Gallant Bess	1946	Montague, Dunsmuir	
Messenger of Peace	1947	Dunsmuir	
The Red Stallion	1947	Mount Shasta, Dunsmuir	
Climb an Angry Mountain	1972	Mount Shasta, Weed, McCloud, Yreka, Castle Crags State Park	
Farewell to Manzanar	1976	Tulelake	
Baby Blue Marine	1976	McCloud, Weed, McCloud River	
Standing Tall	1978	Etna, Yreka	
Stand by Me	1986	McCloud	
Rescue 911 (Box Canyon Rescue)	1992	Mt. Shasta, Box Canyon	
Unsolved Mysteries (Season 8 Episode 1)	1995	Dunsmuir, Sweetbrier	
Babysitter Wanted	2008	Montague, Weed, Lake Shastina, Yreka	
Repo Chick	2009	Dunsmuir	
Bigfoot Country	2012	Siskiyou County	
Happy Camp	2014	Happy Camp	
Andy Grammer: Lease on Life	2021	Castle Lake, Heart Lake, McCloud Falls	
Hotel Dunsmuir	2022	Dunsmuir	
Love Has Won: The Cult of Mother God	2023	Mt. Shasta	
Peter Five Eight	2024	Dunsmuir	
Tracker (Mt. Shasta)	2024	Mt. Shasta	
The Golden Ghosts	2024	Mt Shasta, Yreka, McCloud	
The Lemurian Candidate	2025	Mt Shasta	

== Modoc County ==
Film	Year	Location(s)	Ref.
Modoc Nation: A Untold Story of Survival	2021	Modoc County	

== Humboldt County ==
Film	Year	Location(s)	Ref.
Lass of the Lumberlands	1916	Eureka, Arcata	
The Valley of the Giants	1919	Arcata, Eureka, Korbel	
Man’s Desire	1919	Eureka	
The Little Boss	1919	Arcata, Eureka, Korbel	
Ruggles of Red Gap	1923	Eureka	
Are You a Failure?	1923	Eureka	
The Valley of the Giants	1927	Eureka, Humboldt Redwoods State Park, Scotia Bluffs, Eel River	
Park Avenue Logger	1937	Eureka	
Valley of the Giants	1938	Eureka, Orick, Bridgeville	
King of the Lumberjacks	1940	Humboldt County	
Lassie Come Home	1943	Cape Mendocino	
The Enchanted Forest	1945	Humboldt County	
Challenge to Lassie	1949	Cape Mendocino, Eureka	
The Big Trees	1952	Orick, Humboldt Redwoods State Park	
Gun Glory	1957	Garberville	
Valley of the Redwoods	1960	Eureka, Arcata	
The Gnome-Mobile	1967	Humboldt Redwoods State Park, Avenue of the Giants	
A Death in Canaan	1978	Eureka, Fortuna, Ferndale	
The Immigrants	1978	Eureka	
Salem’s Lot	1979	Ferndale, Eureka	
Halloween III: Season of the Witch	1982	Loleta	
Star Wars: Return of the Jedi	1983	Grizzly Creek Redwoods State Park	
Moonlighting: Next Stop Murder	1985	Northwestern Pacific Railroad, Eel River, Scotia Bluffs	
Ganjasaurus Rex	1987	Garberville, Shelter Cove	
Blue Skies (TV Series)	1988	Indianola, Ferndale	
Jezebel's Kiss	1990	Trinidad, Arcata, Moonstone Beach, Woodley Island	
Jennifer 8	1992	Eureka, Trinidad, Avenue of the Giants	
Alex's Apartment	1992	Eureka	
Beck: Loser	1993	Arcata	
Unsolved Mysteries (Season 6 Episode 8)	1993	Willow Creek, Eureka	
Outbreak	1995	Ferndale, Bridgeville, Avenue of the Giants, Arcata	
Beach Patrol (TV series)	1996	Humboldt County	
The Lost World: Jurassic Park	1997	Sue-meg State Park, Prairie Creek Redwoods State Park	
Almost Heroes	1998	Trinity River, Trinidad, Humboldt Lagoons State Park	
Hyperion Bay (TV Series)	1998–1999	Trinidad, Eureka, Ferndale, Loleta	
Jerry Kilgore: Love Trip	2001	Eureka, Trinidad, Sue-meg State Park, Big Lagoon, Mattole Road	
The Majestic	1999	Ferndale, Trinidad	
Kingdom Come	2001	Ferndale	
Joe Dirt	2001	Ferndale	
Soarin'	2001	Redwood National Park, Redwood Creek	
American Beer	2004	Eureka	
Humboldt County	2008	Eureka, Arcata, Trinidad, Blue Lake	
The Tree of Life	2011	Grizzly Creek Redwoods State Park, Humboldt Redwoods State Park	
Bigfoot: The Lost Coast Tapes	2012	Eureka	
The Wine of Summer	2013	Eureka	
After Earth	2013	Kneeland, Humboldt Redwoods State Park	
Pot Cops (TV Series)	2013	Humboldt County	
Willow Creek	2013	Willow Creek, Bluff Creek	
Treehouse Masters (Sky High Redwood Retreat)	2014	Trinidad	
Swiss Army Man	2016	Sue-meg State Park, Humboldt Redwoods State Park	
The Love Witch	2016	Eureka, Arcata, Cape Mendocino	
Voyage of Time	2016	Humboldt County	
Woodshock	2017	Blue Lake, Arcata, Eureka	
A Wrinkle in Time	2018	Eureka, Trinidad	
An Evening with Beverly Luff Linn	2018	Eureka, Arcata, Fortuna	
Murder Mountain (TV series)	2018	Alderpoint, Garberville, Arcata, Eureka	
The Call of the Wild	2020	Trinidad	
She's in Portland	2020	Eureka, Humboldt Redwoods State Park	
Freeland	2020	Eel River, Southern Humboldt	
The Craftsman (TV Series)	2021-	Eureka	
The Sky Is Everywhere	2022	Eureka, Arcata	
Fire Country	2022-	Rio Dell	
Sasquatch Sunset	2024	Humboldt County	
Afterward	uncertain	Humboldt County	
For When You Get Lost	2024	Eureka, Avenue of the Giants	
Sheriff Country (TV Series)	2025-	Rio Dell, Ferndale	
One Battle After Another	2025	Eureka, Trinidad, Arcata, Cutten	

== Trinity County ==
Film	Year	Location(s)	Ref.
Gold is Where You Find It	1938	Weaverville	
Rescue 911 (Deck Trapped Kid)	1995	Salyer	
North Star (short film)	2022	Trinity Center	

== Shasta County ==
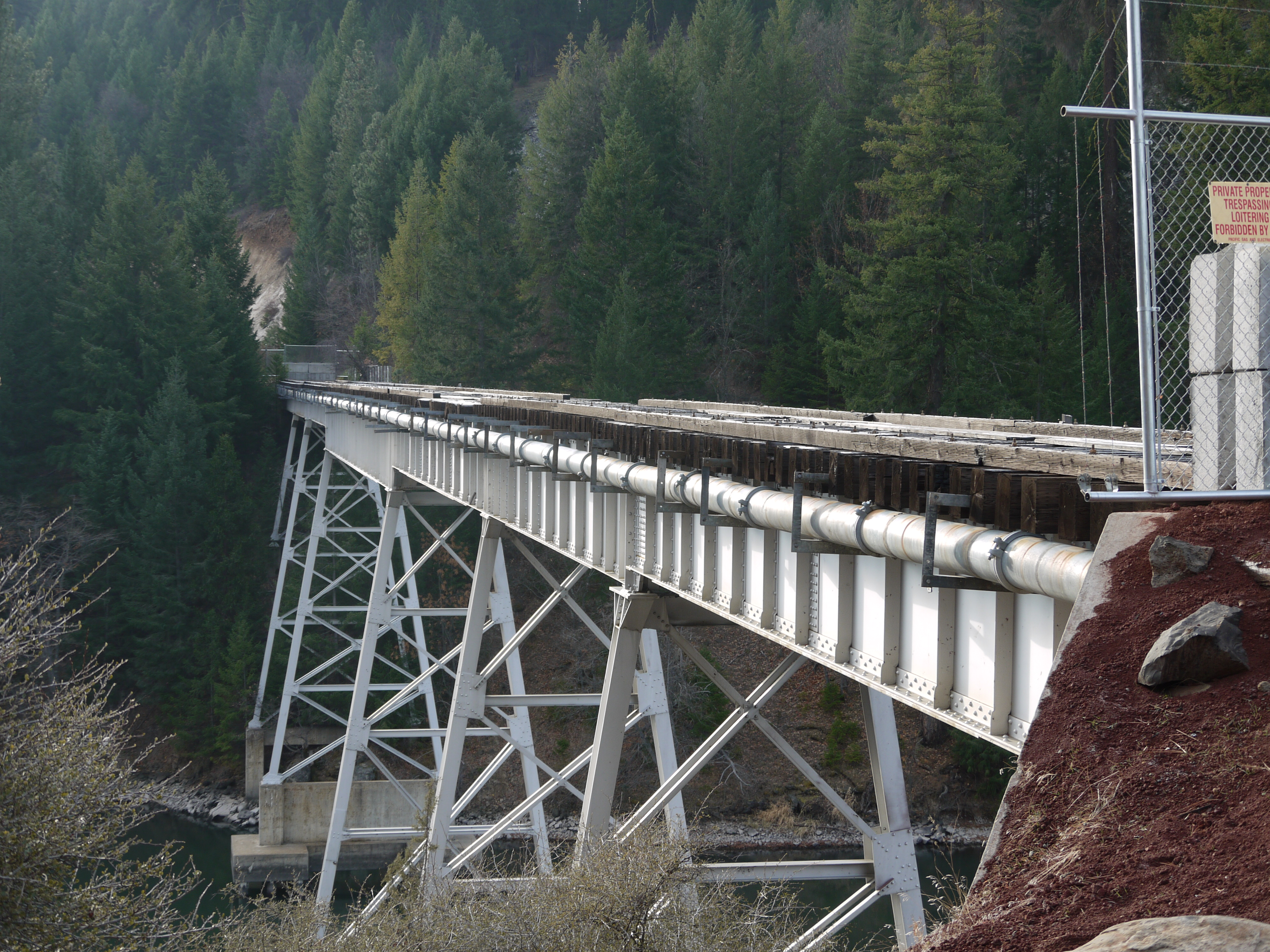
The McCloud River Railroad trestle across Lake Britton in California, which was used for the train chase scene in Stand By Me.

Film	Year	Location(s)	Ref.
Mount Lassen in Action	1918	Mount Lassen	
Jacques of the Silver North	1919	Shasta County	
The Barbarian	1920	Shasta County	
The Re-Creation of Brian Kent	1925	Burney Falls, Pit River	
The Treasure of Lost Canyon	1965	Burney Falls	
The Parson and the Outlaw	1957	Burney Falls	
Tarzan's Fight for Life	1958	Burney Falls, Hat Creek, Pit River	
Hell is for Heroes	1962	Cottonwood	
Climb an Angry Mountain	1972	Redding	
The Flight of the Grey Wolf	1976	Lassen Volcanic National Park	
Firefox	1982	Cassel, Hat Creek, Lassen Peak	
Stand by Me	1986	Lake Britton, Hat Creek	
1969	1988	Shasta County	
Willow	1988	Burney Falls	
Always	1989	Shasta-Trinity National Forest	
Aerosmith: Livin’ on the Edge	1993	Lake Britton	
Rescue 911 (Domestic Stabbing)	1996	Redding, Mercy Medical Center	
Almost Heroes	1998	Redding, Cottonwood, Sacramento River	
Merle Haggard music videos	2000–2001	Shasta County	
Planes: Fire and Rescue	2014	Redding	
Lethal Weapon (Lawmen)	2017	Redding	
Modern Family (Pig Moon Rising)	2017	Redding	
ASAP Ferg: Plain Jane	2017	Redding	
Bright Ones	2019	Redding	
Scotty McCreery: The Soundcheck Sessions Live	2020	Redding	
Donny Osmond: Who	2021	Redding	
Yellow Bird	2023	Palo Cedro	
The Dresden Sun	2026	Redding, Old Shasta, Anderson	

== Lassen County ==
Film	Year	Location(s)	Ref.
Werewolf	1996	Susanville	
Prison Town, USA	2007	Susanville	

== Mendocino County ==
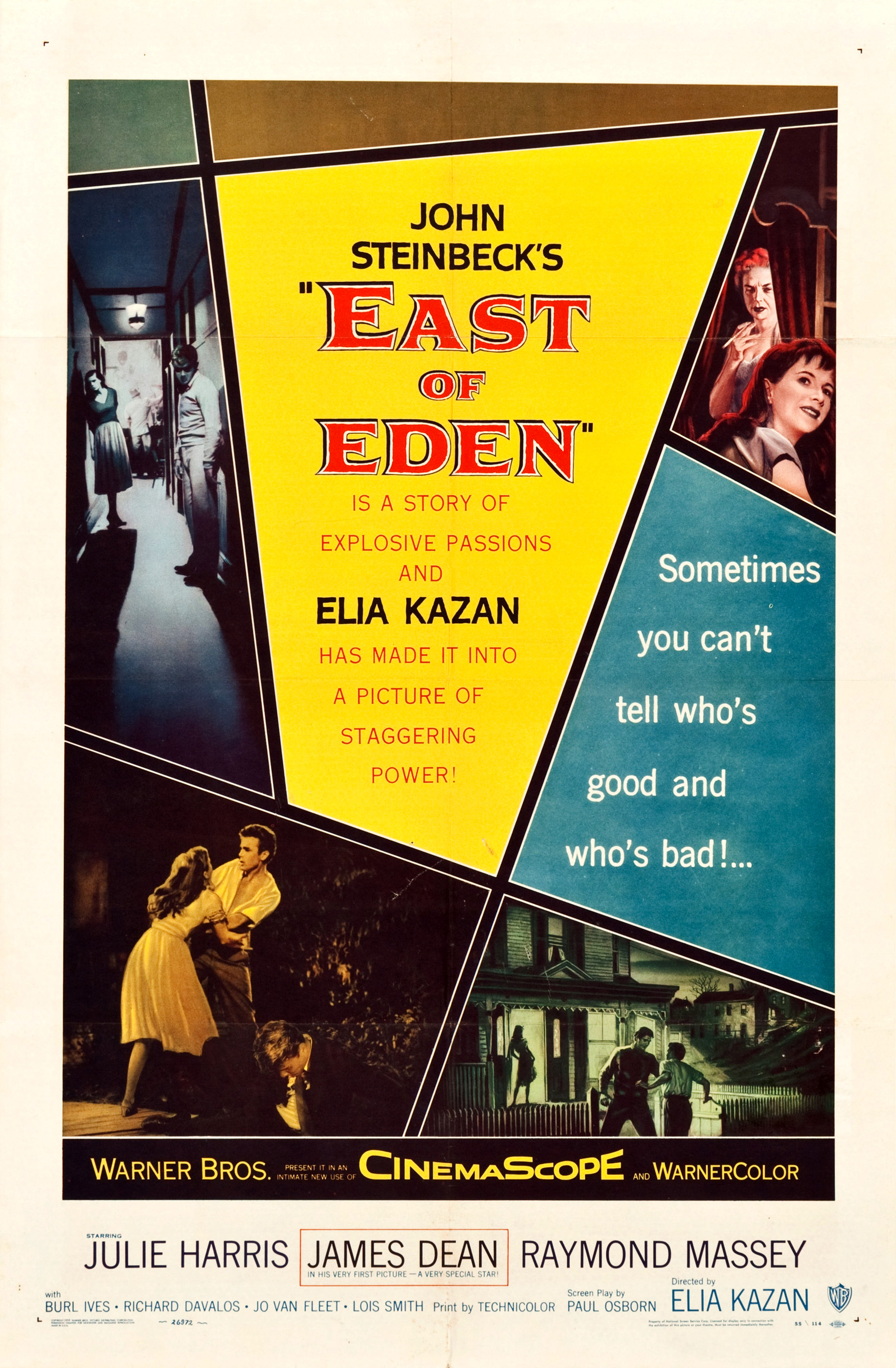
Poster for East of Eden

Film	Year	Location(s)	Ref.
The Promise	1917	Mendocino, Caspar	
The Man Who Dared	1920	Westport, Mendocino	
Kindred of the Dust	1922	Fort Bragg, Caspar, Albion	
Strange Idols	1922	Westport	
Soul of the Beast	1923	Fort Bragg	
The Signal Tower	1924	Fort Bragg, Skunk Train	
In Search of a Hero	1926	Mendocino	
The Uninvited	1944	Elk	
Frenchman’s Creek	1944	Mendocino, Albion, Little River	
Johnny Belinda	1948	Mendocino, Fort Bragg	
East of Eden	1955	Mendocino	
Island of the Blue Dolphins	1964	Anchor Bay, Point Arena	
The Russians Are Coming, The Russians Are Coming	1966	Mendocino, Fort Bragg, Cleone	
The Spirit Is Willing	1967	Mendocino	
The Dunwich Horror	1970	Mendocino, Little River	
Is There a Doctor in the House? (Pilot)	1971	Mendocino County	
Summer of '42	1971	Mendocino, Fort Bragg	
Glen and Randa	1971	Schooner Gulch	
The F.B.I.: Bitter Harbor	1971	Mendocino, Fort Bragg	
The New Healers (Pilot)	1972	Mendocino	
Slither	1973	Manchester	
The Runaway on the Rogue River	1973	Fort Bragg, Skunk Train	
Jeremiah of Jacob’s Neck (Pilot)	1976	Mendocino	
Haunts	1976	unknown	
Evil Town	1974	Mendocino	
Same Time, Next Year	1978	Little River	
Magic	1978	Ukiah	
Strangers: The Story of a Mother and Daughter	1979	Mendocino, Fort Bragg	
Humanoids From The Deep	1980	Mendocino, Fort Bragg	
Dead & Buried	1981	Mendocino, Caspar	
Sutters Bay (Pilot)	1983	Mendocino, Fort Bragg	
Murder, She Wrote	1984–1993	Mendocino, Fort Bragg, Caspar	
Treasure: In Search of the Golden Horse	1984	Point Arena	
Cujo	1983	Mendocino, Fort Bragg	
Racing with the Moon	1984	Mendocino, Fort Bragg	
Dark Mansions	1986	Little River	
Destination America (Pilot)	1987	Mendocino, Fort Bragg	
The Killing Time	1987	Fort Bragg, Mendocino, Caspar	
Overboard	1987	Fort Bragg, Mendocino, Caspar	
Sting: Be Still My Beating Heart	1987	Mendocino	
Wired	1989	Fort Bragg	
The Karate Kid Part III	1989	Elk	
Dying Young	1992	Mendocino	
Forever Young	1992	Point Arena	
Pontiac Moon	1994	Mendocino, Albion	
The Haunting of Seacliff Inn	1994	Mendocino	
Heartwood	1998	Branscomb, Willits	
The Majestic	2001	Fort Bragg, Mendocino, Caspar, Skunk Train	
The Fugitive: Jenny and Strapped	2001	Mendocino	
Shark Swarm	2008	Fort Bragg, Mendocino	
Pig Hunt	2008	Anderson Valley	
Goodbye World	2013	Anderson Valley	
Need for Speed	2014	Ukiah, Mendocino, Point Arena	
Welcome to Willits	2016	Willits	
Kane Brown: What Ifs	2017	Fort Bragg	
Sharp Objects (miniseries)	2018	Redwood Valley	
Sasquatch (TV series)	2021	Laytonville	

== Lake County ==
Film	Year	Location(s)	Ref.
Magic	1978	Blue Lakes, Upper Lake	
Sherman's Way	2008	Middletown, Kelseyville, Lakeport, Clearlake	
Twixt	2011	Kelseyville, Clearlake, Nice, Upper Lake	

== Tehama County ==
Film	Year	Location(s)	Ref.
Hell is for Heroes	1962	Lake California	
J.W. Coop	1972	Red Bluff	
Spree	1993	Red Bluff, Corning	
Cowboy Up: Inside the Extreme World of Bull Riding	2002	Red Bluff	
Buck	2011	Red Bluff	
The Murder of Hi Good	2012		
The Invoking	2013	Red Bluff	

== Butte County ==
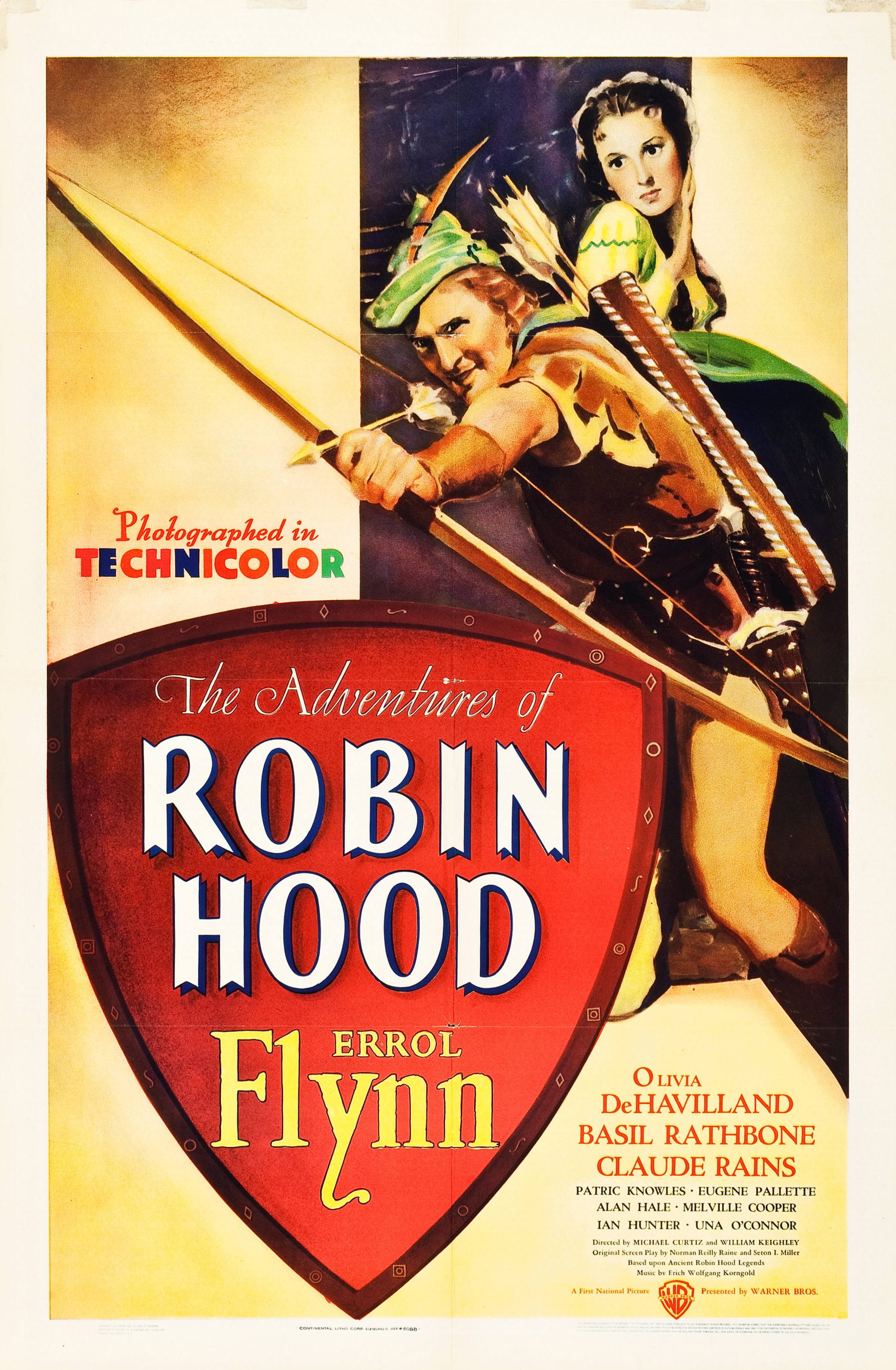
Poster for The Adventures of Robin Hood

Film	Year	Location(s)	Ref.
The Folly of a Life of Crime	1915	Chico, Oroville	
The Sawdust Ring	1917	Chico, Oroville	
Wells Fargo	1937	Chico	
The Adventures of Robin Hood	1938	Chico	
The Great Waltz	1938	Chico	
Another Thin Man	1939	Chico	
Gone with the Wind	1939	Chico, Paradise	
Stand Up and Fight	1939	Chico, Butte Meadows, Jonesville, Stirling City	
Waterloo Bridge	1940	Chico	
Salute to the Marines	1943	Chico, Oroville	
Thirty Seconds Over Tokyo	1944	Chico	
Magic Town	1947	Chico	
The Red Badge of Courage	1951	Chico	
Rage at Dawn	1955	Chico	
The Purple Mask	1955	Chico	
Friendly Persuasion	1956	Chico	
The Chase	1966	Chico	
Brother John	1971	Oroville	
The Klansman	1974	Oroville	
The Outlaw Josey Wales	1976	Oroville	
The Great Smokey Roadblock	1977	Oroville	
B.J. and the Bear (TV Series)^	1978–1981	Oroville	
Rescue 911 (River Tubing Rescue)	1991	Chico	
Stolen Innocence	1995	Chico	
The Siege at Ruby Ridge	1996	Chico, Magalia, Oroville, Paradise, Concow, Orland (sound stage built in North Valley Plaza mall)	
George B.	1997	Oroville, Chico	
Under Wraps	1997	Chico	
American Beer	2004	Chico	
Buck	2011	Chico	
General Education	2012	Gridley, Chico	
Rebuilding Paradise	2020	Paradise, Chico	
Top Gun: Maverick	2022	Lake Oroville, Feather River Canyon	

^two episodes: The Foundling and Snow White and the Seven Truckers Part 1

== Colusa County ==
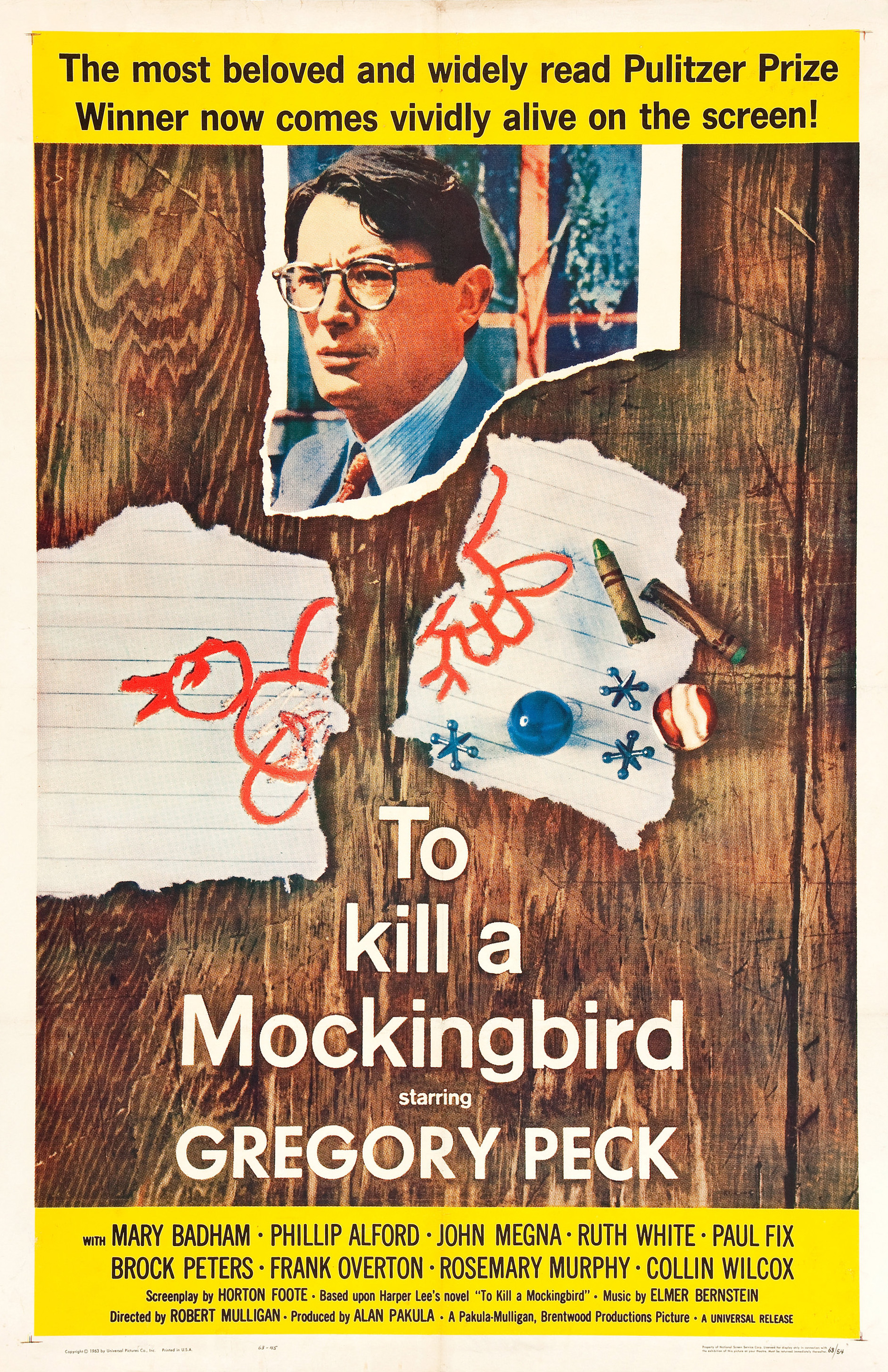
Theatrical Poster for To Kill a Mockingbird

Film	Year	Location(s)	Ref.
The Member of the Wedding (film)	1952	Colusa County	
Blood Alley	1955	Colusa	
To Kill a Mockingbird	1962	Colusa	
The Birds	1963	Sacramento National Wildlife Refuge	
The War Lord	1965	Sacramento River	
The Gypsy Moths	1969	Williams	
...tick...tick...tick...	1970	Colusa, Grimes	
I Walk the Line	1970	Sacramento River	
Brother John	1971	Colusa County	
Trouble Comes to Town	1972	Colusa County	
Paper Moon	1974	Grimes	
Huckleberry Finn	1975	Colusa County	
Treasure of Matecumbe	1976	Colusa	
The Lindbergh Kidnapping Case	1976	Colusa County	

== Glenn County ==
No known movies or scripted television shows have filmed in Glenn County.

== Plumas County ==
Film	Year	Location(s)	Ref.
Call of the Wild	1935	Feather River	
The Treasure of Lost Canyon	1952	Feather River	
The Blazing Forest	1952	Feather River	
Guns of the Timberland	1959	Quincy	
White Water Summer	1987	Cromberg, Quincy	
Pink Cadillac	1989	Quincy	
Breaking Point	1989	Blairsden	
A Cry in the Wild	1990	Quincy, Plumas National Forest	
A Question of Honor	1992	Feather River	
Kingpin	1996	Chilcoot	
Diamonds	1999	Chilcoot	
Fandom	2004	Greenville	
Top Gun: Maverick	2022	High Lakes region	

== Sutter County ==
Film	Year	Location(s)	Ref.
The Well	1951	Yuba City	
...tick...tick...tick...	1970	Meridian, Sutter	
Melvin Purvis: G-Man	1974	Nicolaus	
Tom and Huck	1995	Sutter Bypass	
Lyvia's House	2023	Nicolaus	

== Yuba County ==
Film	Year	Location(s)	Ref.
The Lawless	1950	Marysville	
The Outrage	1950	Marysville	
The Well	1951	Marysville	
The Big Country	1958	Marysville	
A Gathering of Eagles	1963	Beale Air Force Base	
The War Lord	1965	Marysville	
...tick...tick...tick...	1970	Marysville	
Brother John	1971	Marysville	
Buck and the Preacher	1972	Marysville	
The Kansas City Massacre	1975	Marysville	
Citizens Band	1977	Marysville	
First Strike	1979	Beale Air Force Base	
Call to Glory (TV Series)	1984–1985	Beale Air Force Base	
Revenge of the Unhappy Campers	2002	Marysville	
Tweek City	2004	Marysville	
The Muppets	2011	Wheatland	
The Mendoza Line	2014	Marysville	
Bridge of Spies	2015	Beale Air Force Base	
Turning Red	2022	Bok Kai Temple, Marysville	
Lyvia's House	2023	Olivehurst	

== Sierra County ==
Film	Year	Location(s)	Ref.
Beyond the Forest	1949	Loyalton	
Hot Dog…The Movie	1984	Sierraville	
White Water Summer	1987	Sierra City	
XXX	2002	Sierra City	

== Nevada County ==
Film	Year	Location(s)	Ref.
Hit the Ice	1943	Soda Springs	
The Lawless	1950	Grass Valley	
The Well	1951	Grass Valley	
Cannon (TV series): He Who Digs a Grave	1973	Grass Valley, Nevada City	
Moonshine County Express	1977	Grass Valley, Nevada City	
The Incredible Journey of Doctor Meg Laurel	1979	Nevada City	
Undercover with the KKK	1979	Nevada City	
Protocol	1984	Grass Valley	
Starman (TV series)	1986–1987	Grass Valley	
Rescue Me	1992	Grass Valley	
True Lies	1994	Soda Springs	
Simon Says	2006	Grass Valley	
The Christmas Card	2006	Nevada City	

The list of movies filmed in Nevada County's Truckee is too extensive for this page. Some of the movies include Cobb, The Gold Rush, and St. Elmo's Fire. A partial list has been compiled by the Truckee-Donner Historical Society on their website truckeehistory.org, The Union and IMDb.
