= Korbel, California =

Korbel, California may refer to:

- Korbel, Humboldt County, California
- Korbel, Sonoma County, California
