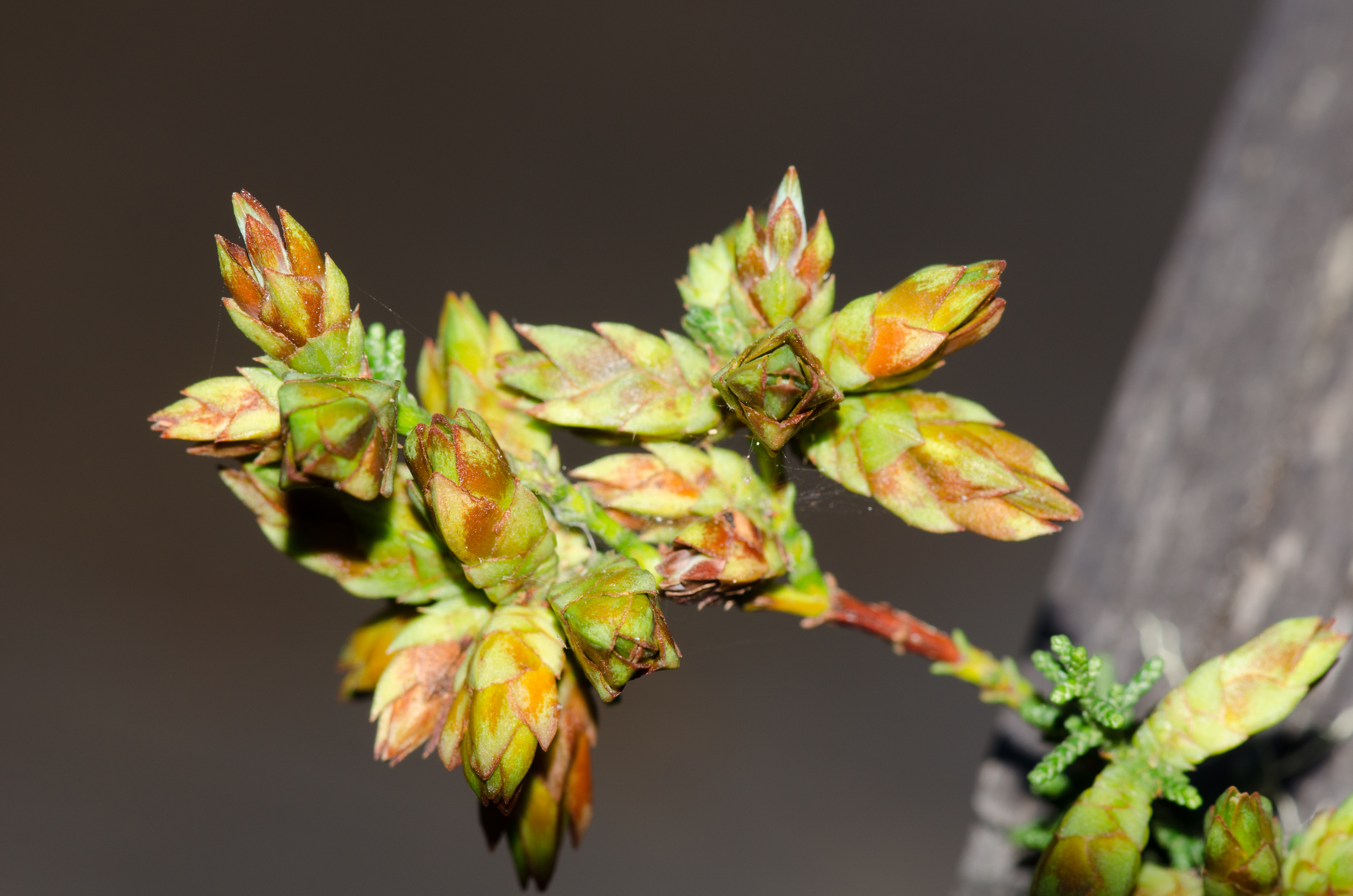
- Cypress tree gall induced by Walshomyia cupressi, Van Damme State Park, Mendocino County, California, 2013

Scientific classification
- Domain: Eukaryota
- Kingdom: Animalia
- Phylum: Arthropoda
- Class: Insecta
- Order: Diptera
- Family: Cecidomyiidae
- Tribe: Oligotrophini
- Genus: Walshomyia; Felt, 1908

= Walshomyia =

Genus of midges

Walshomyia is a genus of gall-inducing midges.

== Taxonomy ==
Walshomyia contains the following species:

- Walshomyia sabinae
- Walshomyia texana
- Walshomyia juniperina
- Walshomyia cupressi
