= Winfield Sheehan =

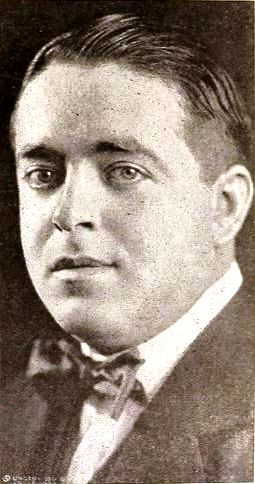
- Sheehan in 1919
- Born: Winfield R. Sheehan; September 24, 1883
- Died: July 25, 1945 (aged 61)
- Spouses: Kay Laurell (m. 1916; died 1927) Maria Jeritza (m. 1935)
- Children: 1

Winfield R. Sheehan (September 24, 1883 – July 25, 1945) was a film company executive. He was responsible for much of Fox Film Corporation's output during the 1920s and 1930s.

As studio head, he won an Academy Award for Best Picture for the film Cavalcade and was nominated three more times.

Most famously, he nurtured the budding stardom of then-child star Shirley Temple, in such films as Stand Up and Cheer! and Curly Top.

A native of Buffalo, New York, Sheehan served in the Spanish–American War as a teen. After working as a cub reporter he became a police reporter for New York's The Evening World in the early 1900s. In 1910, Sheehan became the fire commissioner's secretary and in 1911 performed similar duties for the police commissioner. In the latter capacity, he helped the newly established studio of William Fox, stay afloat in the face of increasing pressure to fold from the Motion Picture Patents Company, which routinely absorbed, intimidated, and ultimately destroyed most fledgling studios.

The Fox case played a vital role in destroying the Motion Picture Patents Company's absolute control. Afterward, Sheehan became William Fox's personal secretary and two years later became the studio's general manager and vice president. He then served as Fox's chief of production from 1926 until 1935, when the studio became part of 20th Century-Fox and was replaced by Darryl Zanuck. After that, Sheehan became an independent producer until he died in 1945.
