= Little River (Mendocino County) =

River in Mendocino County, California, U.S.

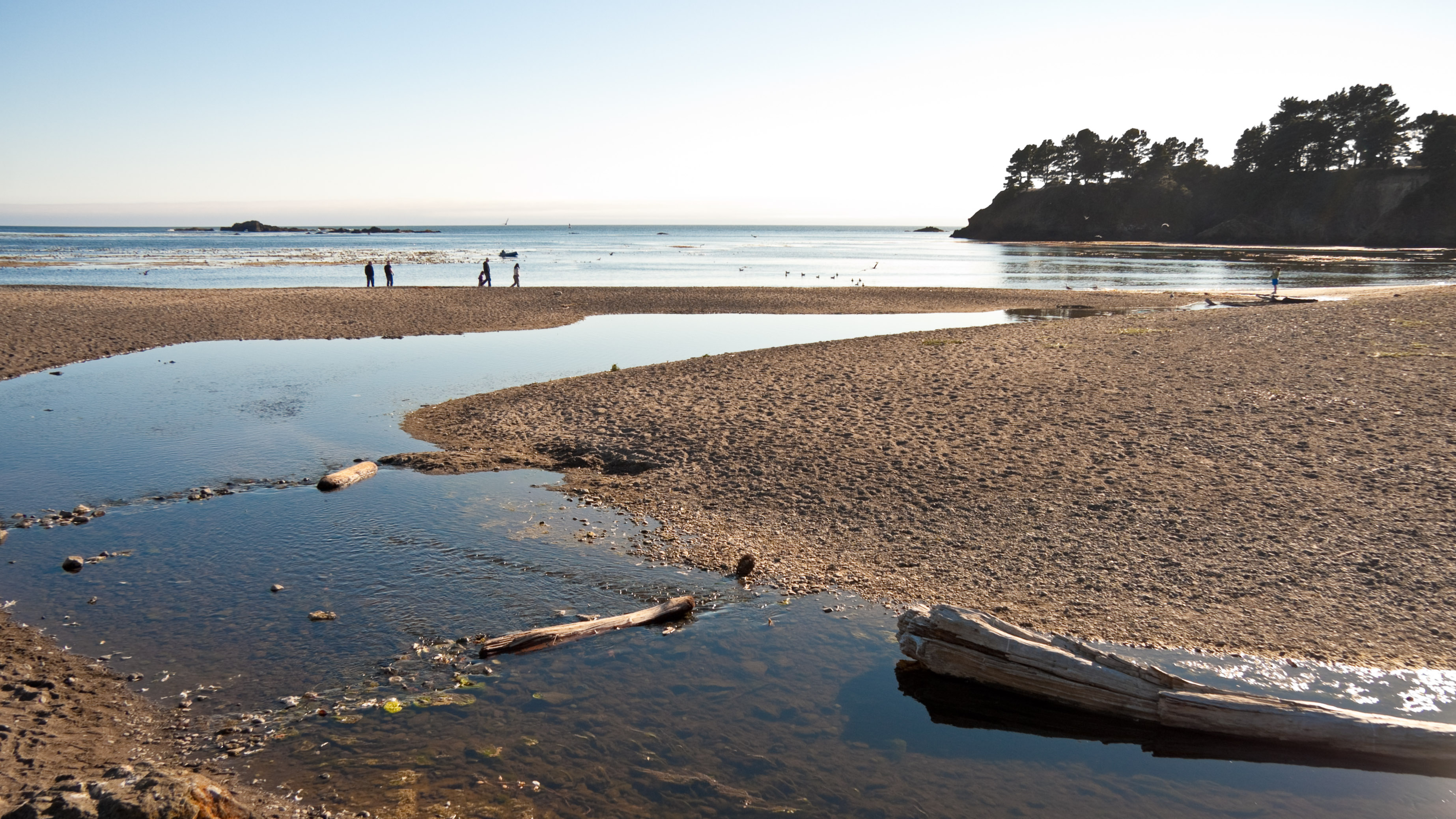
- The mouth of the Little River, in Van Damme State Park

Location
- Country: United States
- State: California
- Region: Mendocino County

Physical characteristics
- Source: Mathison Peak
  - location: 5 miles (8 km) east of Little River, California
  - coordinates: 39°16′16″N 123°41′57″W
- Mouth: Pacific Ocean
  - location: Little River, California
  - coordinates: 39°16′27″N 123°47′29″W
  - elevation: 0 ft (0 m)

Little River (Wiyot: p'lèt kacamale "rocks-small") is a 5.8-mile-long (9.3 km) westward-flowing stream in Mendocino County, California which empties into the Pacific Ocean in Van Damme State Park near the town of Little River, California. Big River enters the Pacific about 2 miles (3 km) farther north.

Tributaries include Laguna Creek, North Fork Little River, Two Log Creek, Russell Brook, and Rice Creek.

== See also ==
- List of rivers in California
