= Kay Laurell =

American actress

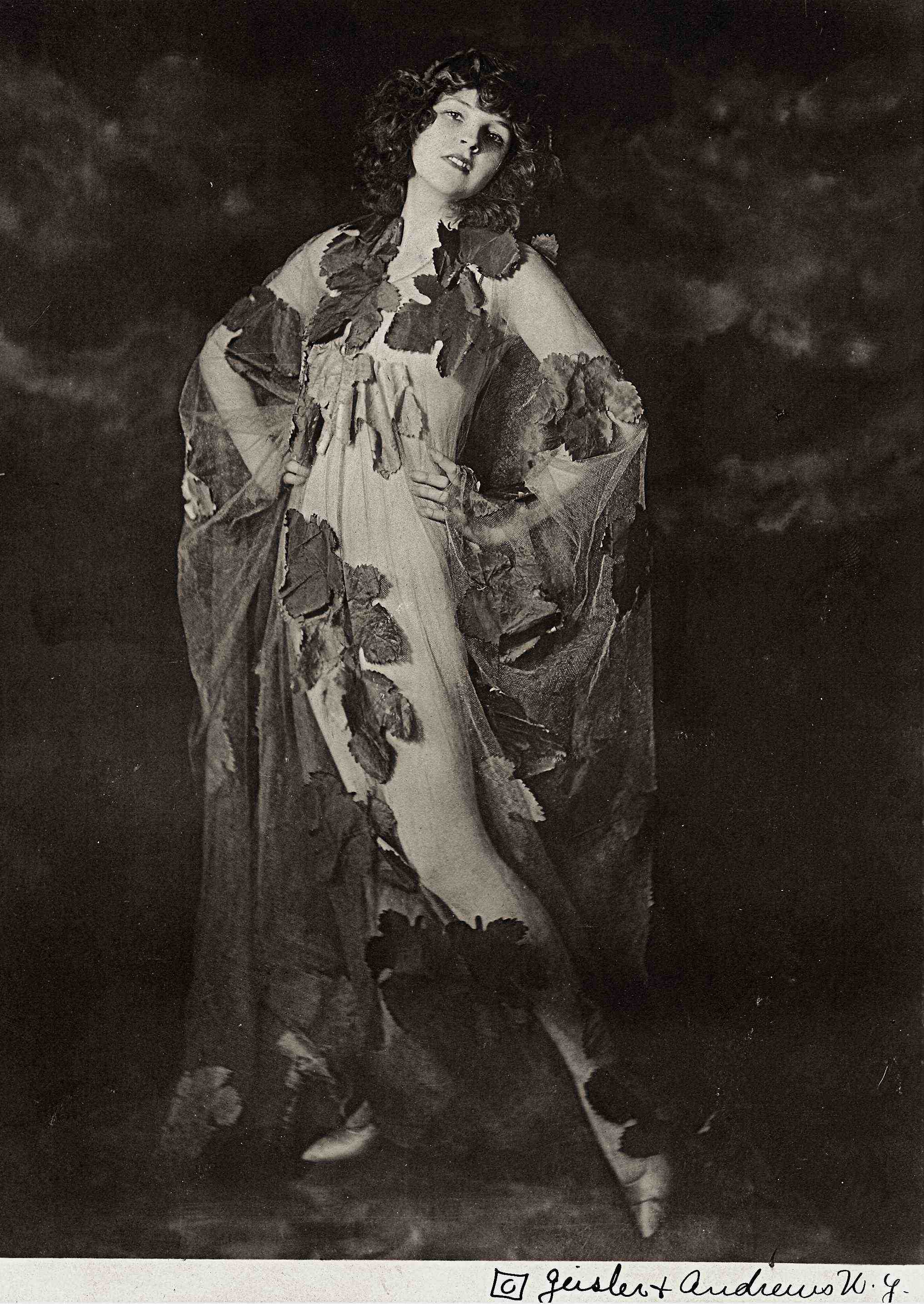
- Kay Laurell prior to 1927
- Born: Ruth Leslie; June 28, 1890; Erie, Pennsylvania, U.S.
- Died: January 31, 1927 (aged 36); London, UK
- Resting place: London
- Occupations: Actress, model, stage performer
- Years active: 1914–1927
- Spouse: Winfield Sheehan (m. 1916; sep. 1917)
- Partner: Joseph Whiteside Boyle
- Children: 1

Kay Laurell (born Ruth Leslie; June 28, 1890 – January 31, 1927) was an American stage and silent film actress and model.

Laurell began her career as an artists' model. After catching the eye of Florenz Ziegfeld, Jr., she was cast in the Ziegfeld Follies, where she debuted in 1914. A popular performer who was noted for her beauty, she was called "one of the most beautiful women on the stage". In 1918, Laurell left the Follies to embark on an acting career. She appeared in stage productions on Broadway and in vaudeville and made three silent films. In the 1920s, she moved to Europe, where she continued her stage career. She died during childbirth at the age of 36 in London.

== Early life ==
Laurell was born Ruth Leslie in 1890 (some sources state 1894) in Erie, Pennsylvania. She left Erie at the age of 16 to pursue a career in show business in New York City. She initially found work as a telephone operator before she was hired as an artists' model. During her stint as a model, she posed for artists and illustrators, including Howard Chandler Christy and William Glackens. During this time, she changed her name from Ruth Leslie to Kay Laurell.

In 1914, Florenz Ziegfeld, Jr., saw Laurell while she was appearing in a tableau staged at the annual Illustrators' Ball. Ziegfeld was impressed by Laurell's appearance and offered her a spot in the Ziegfeld Follies.

== Career ==
=== Ziegfeld Follies ===
Laurell made her stage debut in the Ziegfeld Follies of 1914. The following year, she caused a sensation when she appeared in the opening scene of the 1915 Follies as a semi-nude Aphrodite. The scene was designed by Joseph Urban and featured an elaborate set with a pool surrounded by greenery. Laurell rose out of the water, flanked by two golden elephants with raised trunks from which water poured. According to Doris Eaton Travis's 2003 autobiography The Days We Danced, Laurell became known for "naked-above-the-waist poses". At that time, performers were permitted to appear nude onstage as long as they did not move. This loophole in the law inspired stage producers and set designers to come up with more inventive and elaborate ways to feature nudity in their shows. Eaton Travis later recalled, "The story was that Ziegfeld asked for a volunteer to be naked above the waist, and Kay Laurell was the first to consent. Hers became the most revealed breasts on Broadway in that era." During this time, Laurell's popularity grew, and she was often noted for her physical beauty and "perfect" figure. She was referred to as "one of the most beautiful women on the stage" and "the prettiest chorus girl on Broadway." Florenz Ziegfeld stated that Laurell was the embodiment of feminine beauty.

In May 1916, Laurell married Winfield Sheehan, the former secretary to Rhinelander Waldo, in London. Shortly after the marriage, Laurell retired from the stage. In July 1917, she filed for legal separation from Sheehan, citing "cruelty".

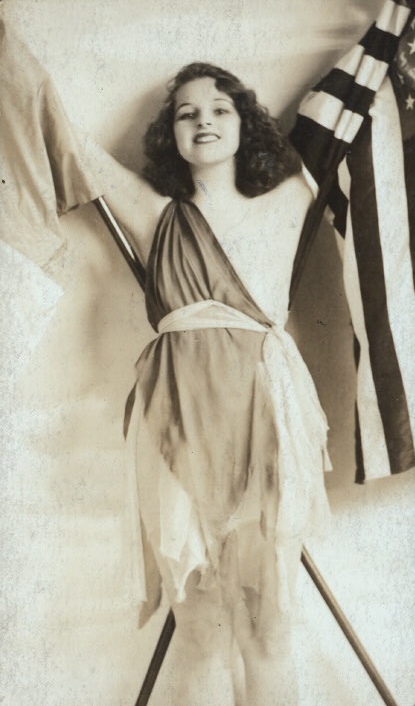
Laurell as "The Spirit of the Allies" in the Ziegfeld Follies of 1918

After separating from Sheehan, Laurell resumed her career and returned to the Follies in June 1918. She was again featured in the opening scene, this time posing as "The Spirit of the Allies" atop a lighted, spinning globe. Because World War I was still on, the globe showed Europe in flames. One of the more memorable tableau scenes of that year's Follies featured patriotic and war imagery designed by Ben Ali Haggin. Social historian Allen Churchill later described the scene: "Actors in battle dress stood frozen in the act of tossing grenades, bayoneting cringing Huns... Follies Girls as Red Cross nurses, waifs in war-torn undress and goddess of war. Dominating the vivid scene was Miss Kay Laurell representing the Spirit of the Allies, her costume in enough disarray to expose one...breast." While the Follies typically featured light-hearted themes, audiences enjoyed the war themed scene of the 1918 Follies. The show ran until the Armistice with Germany in November 1918.

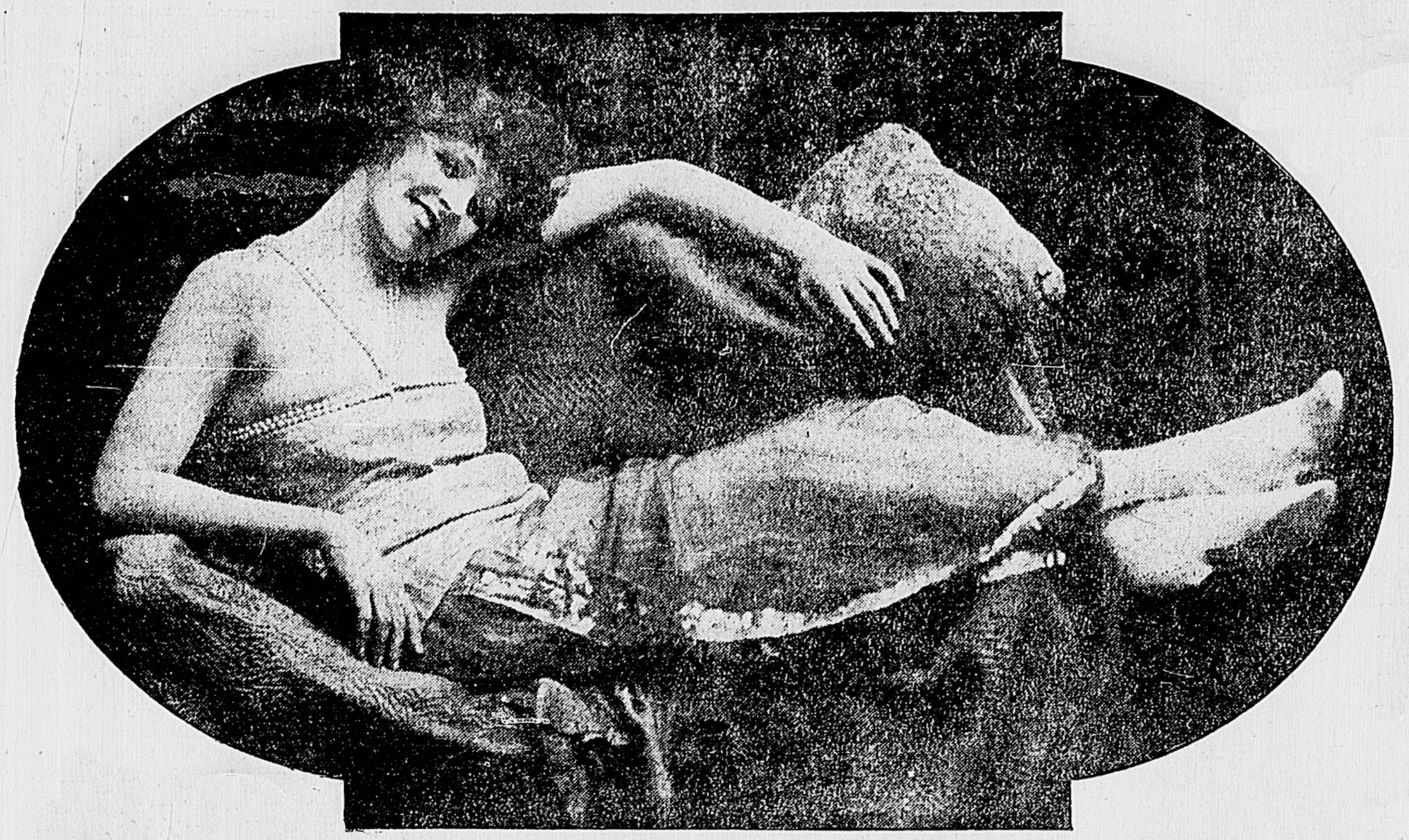
Laurell in 1915

=== Stage and films ===
Like many other Ziegfeld girls, Laurell attempted to parlay the success she found in the Follies into an acting career. In 1919, she made her film debut in The Brand, opposite Russell Simpson. Later that same year, she played a supporting role in The Valley of the Giants, starring Wallace Reid. Laurell received positive reviews for her acting but would make only one more silent film, Lonely Heart, in 1921.

Laurell focused mainly on stage work for the remainder of her career. In 1922, she joined the production of Ladies Night. She remained with the play for a season before headlining the vaudeville circuit with stock companies in Yonkers and Washington. In December 1924, she joined the cast of Quarantine. The play ran for a total of 151 performances at Henry Miller's Theatre through April 1925. Laurell then co-starred in Nocture, which premiered at the Punch & Judy Theatre in New York City on February 16, 1925. The play ran for three performances before closing later that month.

She later moved to Europe, where she found work in a French stock company in Paris. Laurell then moved to London. By this period, her career began to decline, and her roles were no longer reported in theater trades.

== Personal life ==
In May 1916, Laurell married Winfield Sheehan. The couple separated in July 1917 but never divorced. Sheehan later became the general manager and vice president at 20th Century Fox.

While separated from Sheehan, Laurell began a relationship with Joseph Whiteside Boyle, a businessman and the son of Klondike Joe Boyle. The couple planned to marry after both obtained divorces from their respective spouses. In 1926, Laurell became pregnant.

== Death ==
On January 31, 1927, Laurell died in London at the age of 36. Laurell's death was initially attributed to pneumonia. She was cremated and her ashes were buried in London. In 1930, the press discovered that Laurell actually died while giving birth to her only child. The child, a boy named Joseph K. Boyle, survived.

=== Estate ===
Before her death, Laurell drew up a will leaving her property and personal effects to Joseph Whiteside Boyle (who was presumed to be the child's father) and named him the executor of her estate. Laurell left her $100,000 estate to Boyle because she was unaware that her son, who was born out of wedlock, could legally inherit her assets. However, one month before Laurell's death, the Legitimacy Act 1926 was passed in England, which allowed her son to inherit her assets. A similar law in New York (where Laurell also had bank accounts and property) also allowed her son to inherit his mother's estate.

Concerned for the child's welfare, Laurell's brother Raleigh J. Leslie, sought a letter of administration for her estate, naming Joseph K. as her next of kin. He later dropped the matter after discovering that the boy's father, Joseph Whiteside Boyle, had been caring for the child since birth and had no plans to claim Laurell's estate. One month after Laurell's death, her mother, Mrs. A. A. Leslie, died in Erie, Pennsylvania. Laurell's mother was never told of her daughter's death as she was dying at the time. Upon Mrs. Leslie's death, she left her Erie, Pennsylvania, home and assets to Laurell; they were subsequently inherited by Laurell's son, who died in 1996.

== Stage career ==
Date	Production	Role
June 1 – September 5, 1914	Ziegfeld Follies of 1914	Performer
June 21 – September 13, 1915	Ziegfeld Follies of 1915	Performer
June 18, 1918 – date unknown	Ziegfeld Follies of 1918	Performer
December 16, 1924 – April 27, 1925	Quarantine	Pamela Josephs
February 16, 1925 – February 1925	Nocturne	Jenny Blanchard

== Filmography ==
Year	Title	Role	Notes
1919	The Brand	Alice Andrews	
1919	The Valley of the Giants	Moira McTavish	
1921	Lonely Heart		(final film role)

== In popular culture ==
H.L. Mencken said Laurell possessed "all the arts of the really first-rate harlot" and was "the most successful practitioner of her trade of her generation in New York." He said, "Much of what I got from her, in fact, went into In Defense of Women", his 1918 book. Playwright Channing Pollock wrote, however, "Kay could have gone far if she had been willing to exchange her favors for advancement, but she didn't 'want to get ahead that way'."
