= Naval Outlying Landing Field Cotati =

- IATA: none; ICAO: none

Summary
- Location: Cotati, California
- Coordinates: 38°21′00″N 122°43′12″W
- Interactive map of Naval Outlying Landing Field Cotati

Naval Outlying Landing Field Cotati was a naval airfield located near Cotati, in Sonoma County, California, US. It maintained active naval flight operations during the period 1941–1945.

== History ==
The federal government purchased 142 acres of farmland in 1941 to build an outlying airfield supporting operations at Naval Air Station Alameda. A 4,000-foot asphalt-paved runway was oriented 070-250 and crossed at its midpoint by a second 3,800-foot asphalt runway oriented 130–310. Each runway had a parallel taxiway, and a third taxiway connected the easterly ends of the two runways to an intermediate concrete apron. An additional 75 acres acquired in June, 1943 allowed construction of an operations building with a two-story control tower, a fire and crash truck garage, two gasoline storage tanks, an oil storage building, a small arms ammunition magazine, a well for the airfield water supply, and a backstop used for small arms practice and aircraft machinegun collimation. Simultaneous development of NALF Santa Rosa was more extensive because poor site drainage caused periodic flooding of the Cotati field. Touch-and-go landing practice became the primary activity at the Cotati satellite airfield of the Santa Rosa Auxiliary Naval Air Station. Runway damage from 1945 flooding terminated military flight operations at Cotati despite continuing use of NALF Santa Rosa.

== Post-War ==
After the Navy declared the airfield excess property, the runways and taxiways were used for automobile sports car racing from 1957 to 1972. It was visited by celebrities including Stirling Moss, Jayne Mansfield, and Steve McQueen. Subsequent commercial development of the area obscured locations of former runways and buildings.
