= Naval Auxiliary Landing Field Santa Rosa =

NALF Santa Rosa, California Santa Rosa Air Center
- IATA: none; ICAO: none

Summary
- Location: Santa Rosa, California, US
- Coordinates: 38°24′58″N 122°45′45″W
- Interactive map of NALF Santa Rosa, California

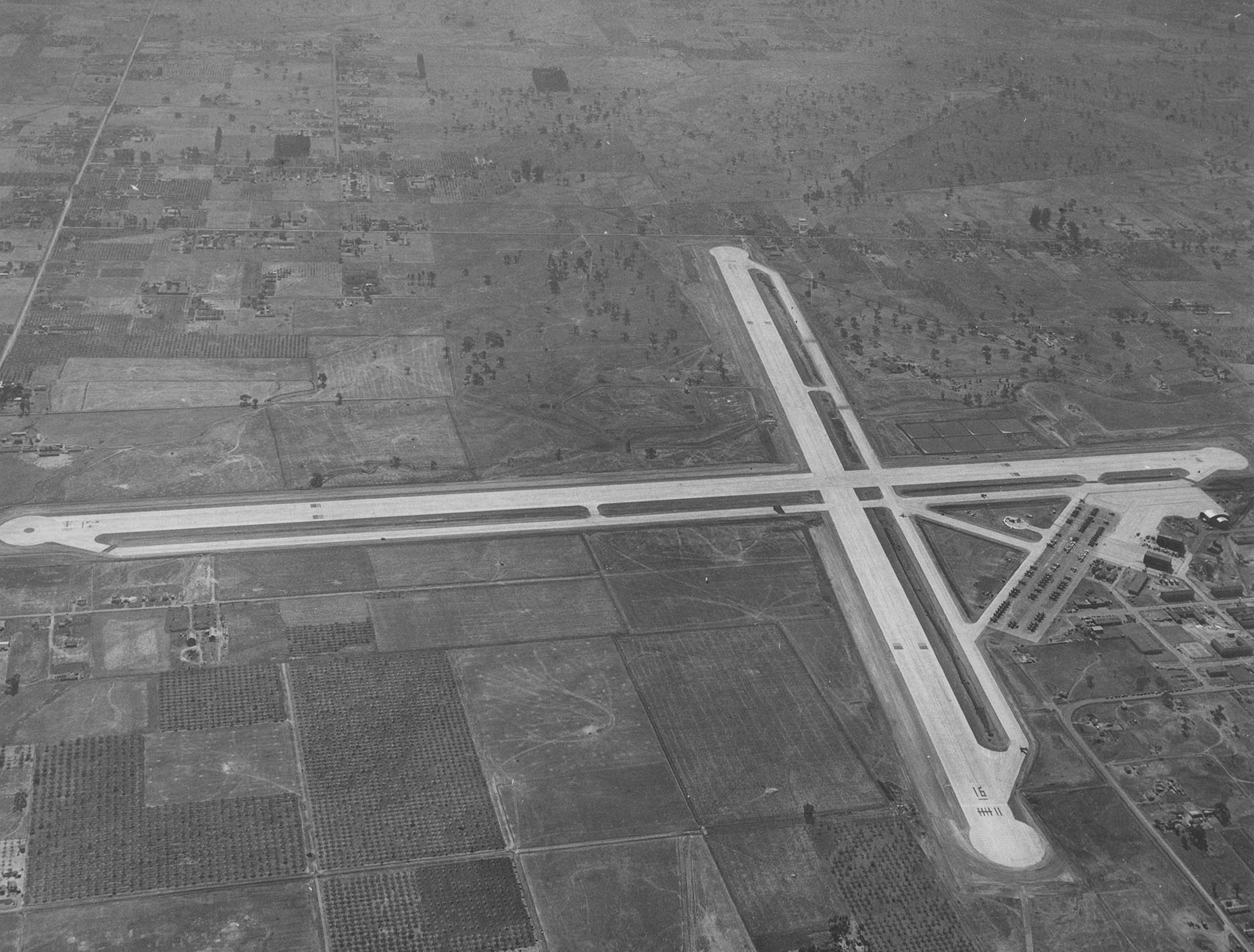
NALF Santa Rosa October 1944

Naval Auxiliary Landing Field (NALF) Santa Rosa, California, also known as Naval Auxiliary Air Station, Santa Rosa, was a military airport located in Santa Rosa, California, in Sonoma County, California, US.

== History ==
NALF Santa Rosa was first commissioned in 1943, as a naval outlying landing field of Naval Air Station Alameda. There were two 7,000-foot concrete runways. One of these runways was oriented at 160-340 and the other was oriented at 060–240. Each runway had a parallel taxiway, and there was a concrete apron in the northwest quadrant of the runway crossing. Two other outlying landing fields, Naval Outlying Landing Field Cotati and Naval Outlying Landing Field Little River, supported Santa Rosa flight operations training 21 squadrons of fighters, dive bombers, and torpedo planes during World War II. The Santa Rosa airfield was relinquished by the US Navy between 1946–48 and reactivated in 1951 for the Korean War. It was abandoned by the Navy between 1952 and 1954. It was reopened between 1966 and 1967 as a civilian airport named the Santa Rosa Air Center, and it permanently closed in 1991.

== Film locations ==
- Die Hard 2 (1990) Scenes shot at Santa Rosa Air Center.
- Stop! Or My Mom Will Shoot! (1992) Shot over a four-week period at Santa Rosa Air Center.
