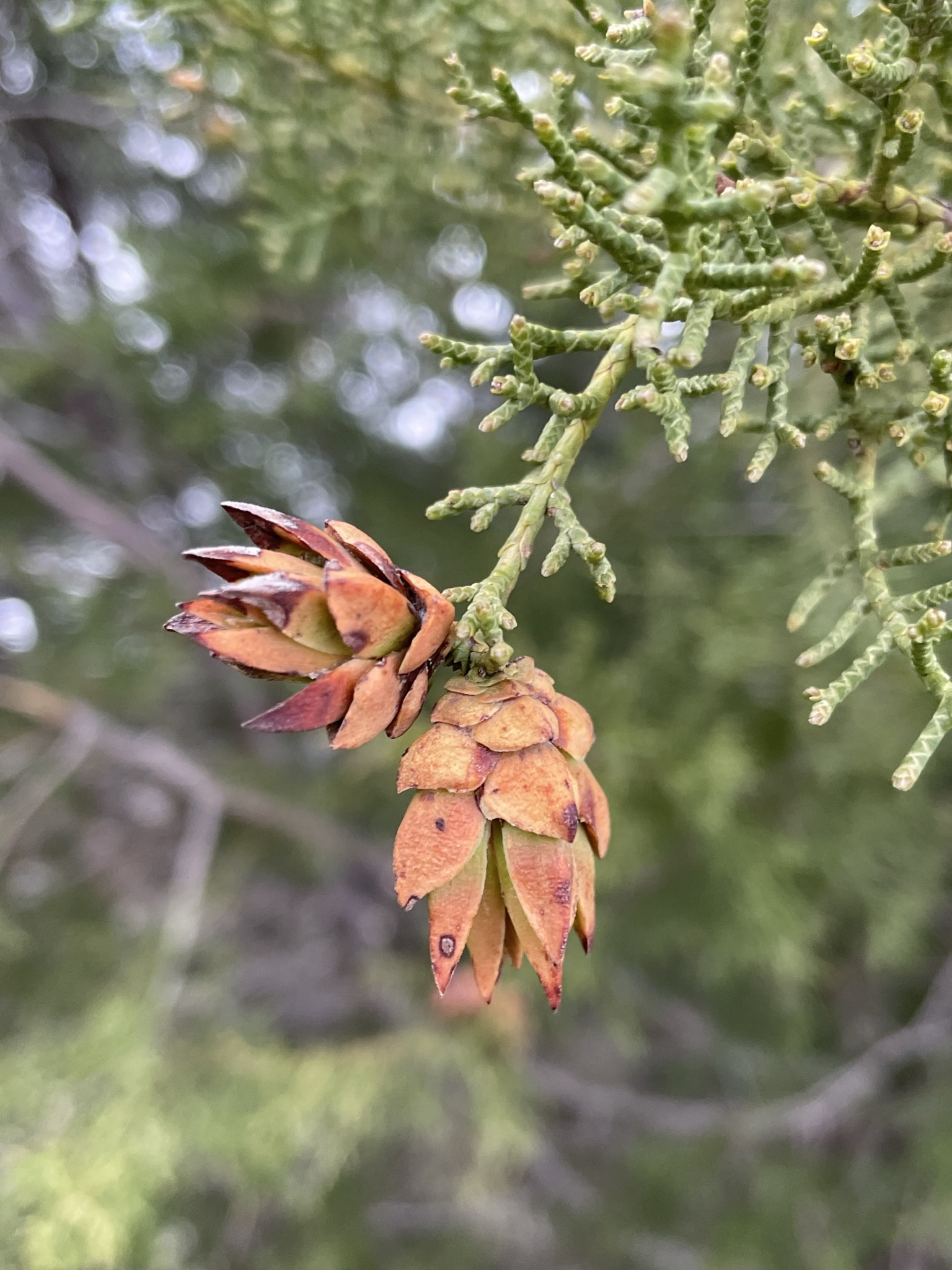

Scientific classification
- Domain: Eukaryota
- Kingdom: Animalia
- Phylum: Arthropoda
- Class: Insecta
- Order: Diptera
- Family: Cecidomyiidae
- Genus: Walshomyia
- Species: W. cupressi

Binomial name
- Walshomyia cupressi Gagné, 1969

= Walshomyia cupressi =

Gall-inducing midge

Walshomyia cupressi is a North American species of midge that induces galls on pygmy cypress and Sargent cypress trees in California and Oregon. The larval stage lasts for almost two years before adults emerge from exit holes from the side of the gall. The holotype species was collected in 1967 in Mendocino County, California and described by Raymond Gagné in 1969.
