= Little River Inn =

Inn in Little River, California, US

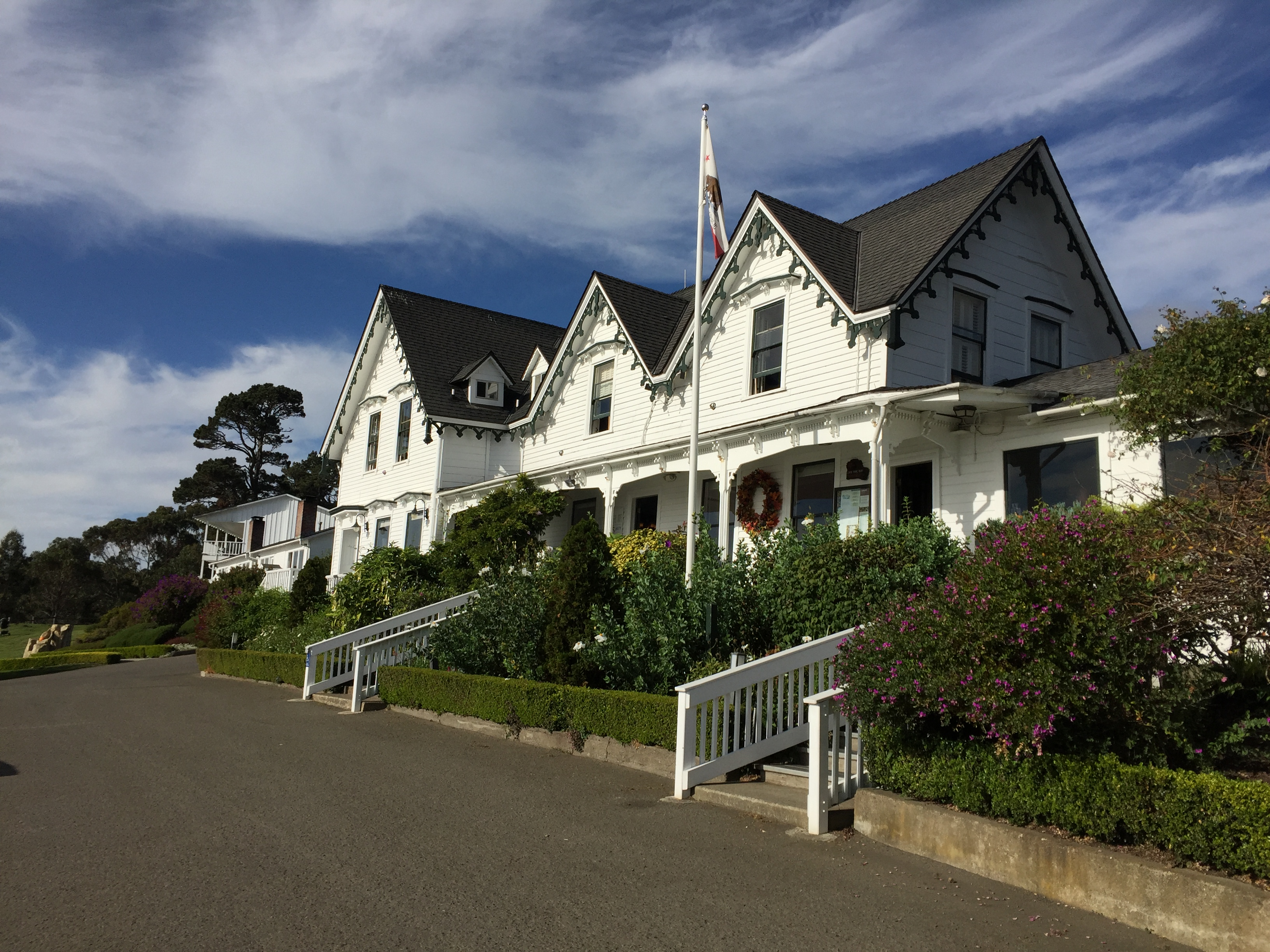
- 2015

- Location within California Little River Inn (the United States)

General information
- Location: 7901 North Highway One; Little River, California; United States
- Coordinates: 39°16′18.99″N 123°47′20.45″W
- Opening: 1939
- Owner: Cally Dym; Melissa Pyorre

Technical details
- Floor count: 2

Other information
- Number of rooms: 67
- Number of suites: 10
- Number of restaurants: 1
- Parking: On site

Website
- Official website

The Little River Inn is located in Little River, California in the United States. The inn is located on the Mendocino Coast on California State Route 1 (SR-1).

== History ==
The original inn building was built in 1853 by Silas Coombs. It was built in the Victorian style. In 1939, Coombs granddaughter, Cora, and her husband, Ole Hervilla, opened the property as an inn, which comprised a two-story motel. The on-site bar, called Ole's Whale Watch, is the former bedroom of Silas Coombs' wife.

It expanded to include new buildings on the original property and on other nearby properties. It remains owned by the Coombs family. Today, the property encompasses 225 acres.

=== Hollywood history ===
One of the first guests of the inn, in 1939, was the actress Myrna Loy. Joan Fontaine and other cast members of Frenchman's Creek stayed at the Inn during 1943. Jane Wyman, and then husband Ronald Reagan, stayed there during the filming of Johnny Belinda, in 1947. James Dean stayed at the hotel in 1954, which was used as the casting office and headquarters for the Mendocino-based filming of East of Eden. He was kicked out of Ole's Whale Watch after putting his feet on a bar table top.

In 1966, Jonathan Winters, who was filming The Russians Are Coming, the Russians Are Coming in Mendocino, visited Ole's Whale Watch and performed an impromptu, three-hour-long comedy show.

== Facilities ==
=== Rooms ===
Many of the inn's 65 rooms have family heirlooms on display. Suites have jacuzzi tubs, wetbars, and fire places. The inn is dog friendly. The majority of rooms have an ocean view. The main property is located on a hill, with the ocean directly across the street, past Highway 1. Other inn rooms are located on the west side of Highway 1, on cliffs overlooking the ocean.

=== Amenities ===
The inn has a nine-hole golf course, two tennis courts, day spa, restaurant and bar. The restaurant's executive chef is Marc Dym. The restaurant serves local seafood, including petrale sole from Fort Bragg. A signature dish ingredient for sweeter dishes is the olallieberry, which is inspired by Ole Hervilla's Swedish heritage. It is served with pancakes and used in cobbler, the latter which uses a recipe created by Cora Coombs. Dym has partnered with Anderson Valley Brewing Company to create specialty craft beers, including Saison 75, a saison (sparkling pale ale) that uses three types of hops and a spice blend created by Dym. John Sverko is the restaurant and bar's sommelier (wine expert).
