= Little River Airport =

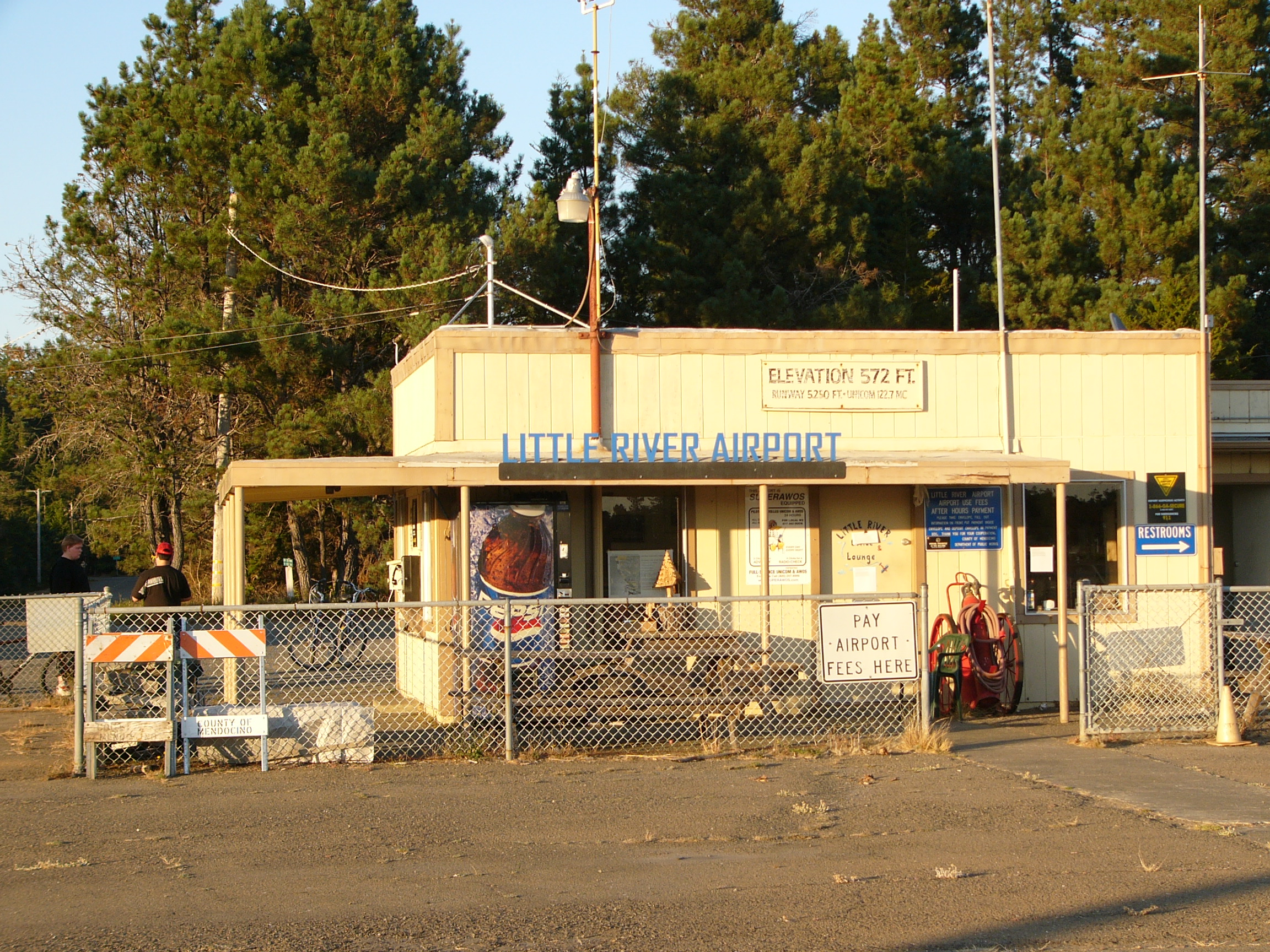
- IATA: none; ICAO: KLLR; FAA LID: LLR

Summary
- Airport type: Public
- Owner: Mendocino County
- Serves: Little River, California
- Elevation AMSL: 572 ft (174 m)
- Coordinates: 39°15′43″N 123°45′13″W
- Interactive map of Little River Airport

Runways
Direction	Length		Surface
Direction	ft	m	Surface
11/29	5,249	1,600	Asphalt

Statistics (2004)
- Aircraft operations: 6,300
- Source: Federal Aviation Administration

Little River Airport (ICAO: KLLR, FAA LID: LLR, formerly O48) is a small county-owned public-use airport located three nautical miles (6 km) southeast of the central business district of Little River, in Mendocino County, California, United States.

Although most U.S. airports use the same three-letter location identifier for the FAA and IATA, this airport is assigned LLR by the FAA but has no designation from the IATA.

== History ==
In 1945, this airport was built by the Navy served as an outlying field to NALF Santa Rosa. The Naval Auxiliary Air Station at Santa Rosa, California, was part of a network of training airfields supporting Naval Air Station Alameda.

The airport offered commercial air service beginning in the late 1940s, provided by Southwest Airways utilizing World War II surplus DC-3s.

== Facilities and aircraft ==
Little River Airport covers an area of 548 acres (222 ha) and contains one asphalt paved runway designated 11/29 which measures 5,249 by 150 feet (1,600 x 46 m). For the 12-month period ending February 4, 2004, the airport had 6,300 aircraft operations, an average of 17 per day: 98% general aviation and 2% air taxi.
