= Klamath River, California =

Unincorporated community in California, United States

Klamath River
- Unincorporated community
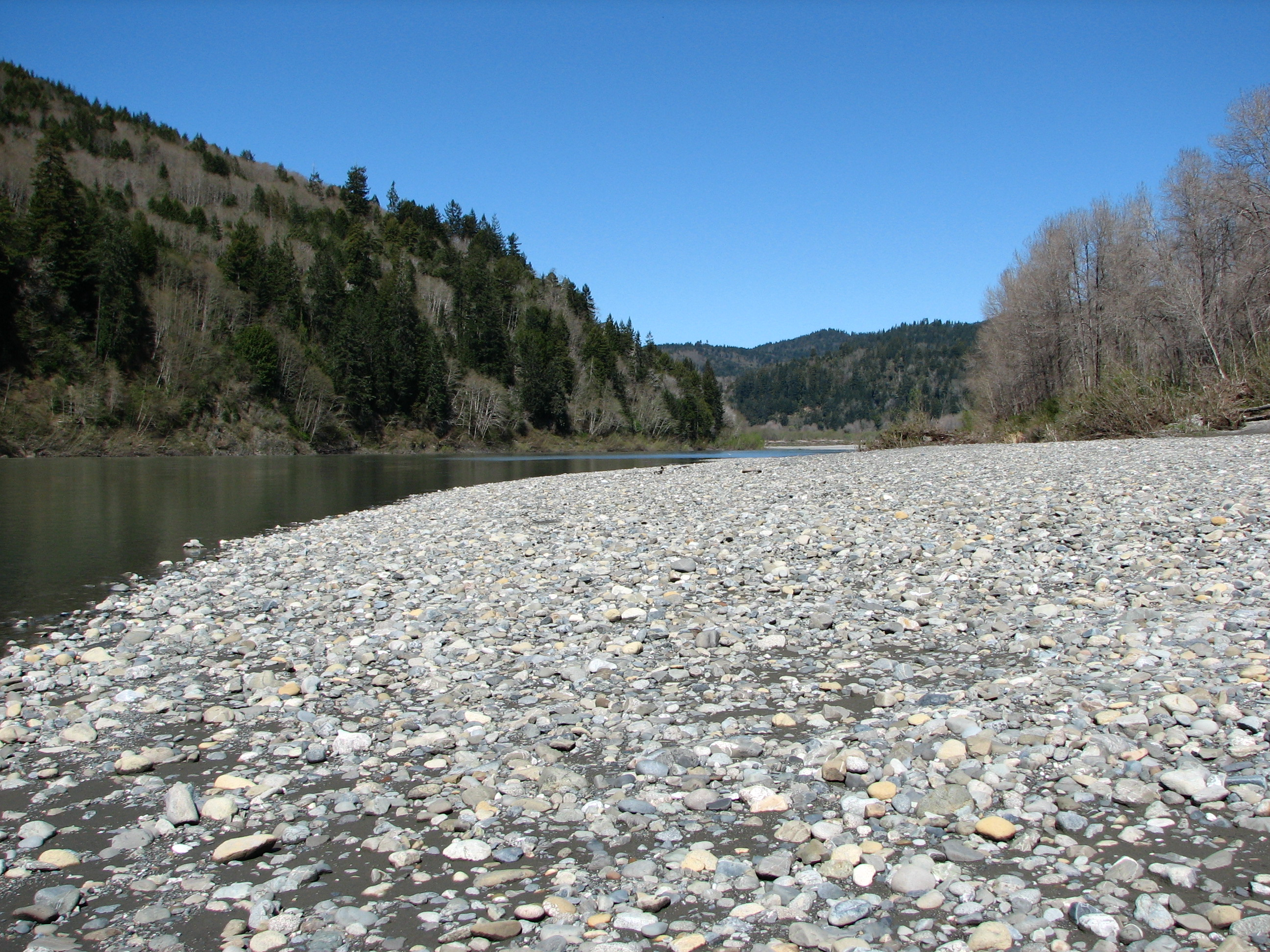
- A view of the Klamath River, 2006.

- Location within California
- Coordinates: 41°51′40″N 122°49′32″W
- Country: United States
- State: California
- County: Siskiyou

Population
  - Total: 190
- ZIP code: 96050

Klamath River is an unincorporated community in Siskiyou County, California, United States, situated on the Klamath River. It is located on State Route 96, near the Oregon border. The name "Klamath" was derived from an Indian word Tlamatl which means "they of the (Klamath) river," from /-matl/ "river." in Chinook. The community of Klamath River is approximately 11 miles (18 km) long and includes both sides of the river from Gottville to Kohl Creek. The population is 190. In 2022, a forest fire destroyed most of the structures in the town.

== History ==
The Klamath River area was home to the Hupa (Hoopa), Karuk, Modoc, and Yurok Indian tribes. Native Americans relied on the river for its abundance of salmon and trout.

The California Gold Rush of 1848–1855 brought many miners to the Klamath River watershed. The miners caused disruption in the lives of the Native Americans of the area by damming and diverting water for mining purposes, which made it difficult for spawning salmon and other fish populations to survive. There are remnants of old mining sites along the river. The town of Happy Camp, first settled in 1851, was named for its fruitful yields of gold. The Klamath River was used by the Quicksilver Mining Co. in the late 19th century where they extracted mercury and cinnabar located up Beaver Creek. Tunnels that were dug to extract gold were later used by bootleggers of whiskey.

In 2022, the McKinney Fire destroyed most of the structures in the town, leaving only a handful of homes.

== Wildlife and the environment ==
Klamath River hosts the largest deer herd in California, and the largest concentrations of ducks and geese on the North American continent. There are also many black bear, elk, bobcat, mountain lion, raccoon, quail, grouse, pheasant, squirrel, kit fox, river otter, beaver, badger, porcupine, weasel, skunks, coyotes, a variety of toads and frogs, blue herons, bald and American eagles, along with over 200 species of birds. Historically, the Klamath River was the third largest salmon water-shed on the west coast.

The weather in Siskiyou County varies with the seasons, with summer temperatures of 75 to 105 °F (24 to 41 °C), while in the winter, it can drop as low as 15 °F (−9 °C) with a high of 65 °F (18 °C).
