= The Valley of the Giants (1919 film) =

1919 film by James Cruze

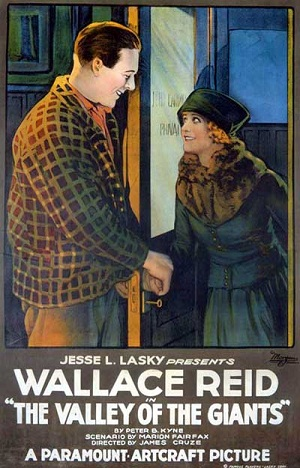
- Lobby poster
- Directed by: James Cruze
- Written by: Marion Fairfax (scenario)
- Based on: Valley of the Giants; 1918 novel by Peter B. Kyne
- Produced by: Jesse Lasky
- Starring: Wallace Reid; Grace Darmond
- Cinematography: Frank Urson
- Production company: Famous Players–Lasky/Artcraft
- Distributed by: Paramount Pictures
- Release date: August 31, 1919
- Running time: 5 reels (4,625 feet)
- Country: United States
- Language: Silent (English intertitles)

Valley of the Giants is a 1919 American silent romantic drama film directed by James Cruze and starring Wallace Reid and Grace Darmond. Based on Peter B. Kyne's popular 1918 novel of the same name, the film produced by Famous Players–Lasky and distributed through Paramount Pictures.

The book would be filmed three more times.

- The Valley of the Giants (1927)
- The Valley of the Giants (1938)
- The Big Trees (1952)

The film in a contemporary 1920 Ohio cinema.	The Valley of the Giants (1919)

== Synopsis ==
Wallace Reid stars in this Peter B. Kyne story set in the Northwoods. Kyne's stories were quite popular in the silent era along with Rex Beach, Jack London, Bret Hart and others. Reid had visited Northwoods stories before such as in 1917's Big Timber.

== Cast ==
- Wallace Reid as Bryce Cardigan
- Grace Darmond as Shirley Sumner
- William Brunton as Buck Ogilvy
- Charles Ogle as Cardigan
- Ralph Lewis as Col. Pennington
- Alice Terry as Mrs. Cardigan (credited as Alice Taafe)
- Kay Laurell as Moira McTavish
- Jack Hoxie as Jules Rondeau (credited as Hart Hoxie)
- Noah Beery as Black Minorca
- Guy Oliver as George Sea Otter
- William H. Brown as Judge Moore (credited as W. H. Brown)
- Richard Cummings as McTavish
- Virginia Foltz as Marcelle
- Ogden Crane as Mayor Poundstone
- Lillian Mason as Mrs. Poundstone

== Location ==
The film was shot on locations in Humboldt County, California.

== Preservation ==
This film was presumed lost for 90 years until 2010 when a print was returned to the United States from Russia's Gosfilmofond archive. Flash titles were in the Russian language. In 2022 Edward Lorusso translated the Russian titles and produced the film for DVD release with a new music score by David Drazin.

== See also ==
- Wallace Reid filmography
