= The Valley of the Giants (1927 film) =

1927 film by Charles Brabin

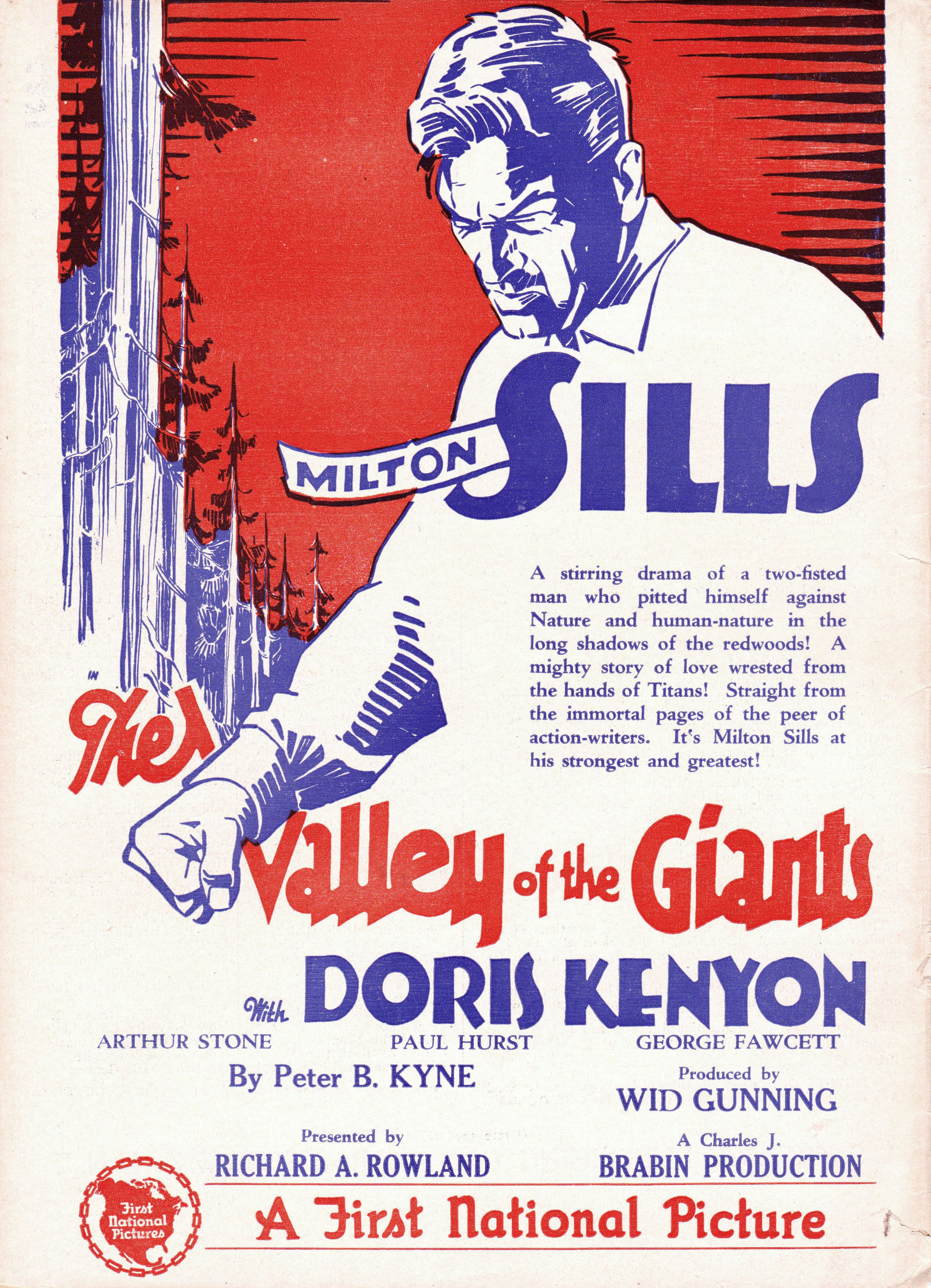
- Film poster
- Directed by: Charles Brabin
- Written by: L. G. Rigby (scenario)
- Based on: The Valley of the Giants; 1918 novel by Peter B. Kyne
- Produced by: First National; Wid Gunning; Richard A. Rowland
- Starring: Milton Sills; Doris Kenyon
- Cinematography: Ted D. McCord (as T. D. McCord)
- Distributed by: First National Pictures
- Release date: December 4, 1927
- Running time: 7 reels; 6,600 feet
- Country: United States
- Language: Silent (English intertitles)

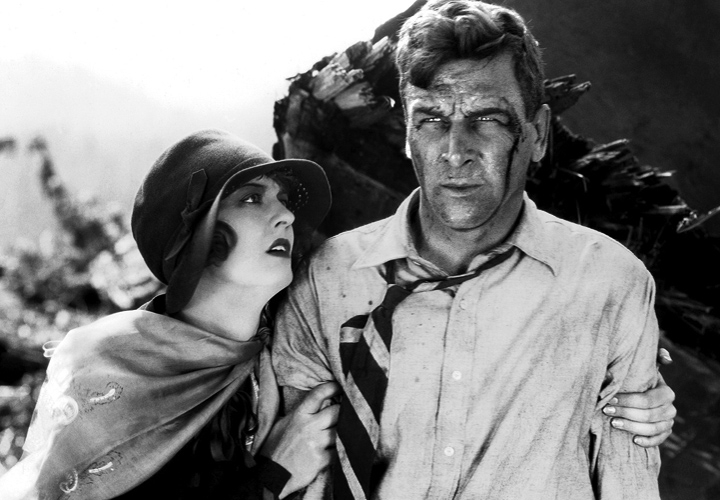
Still with Doris Kenyon and Milton Sills

The Valley of the Giants is a 1927 American silent adventure film directed by Charles Brabin and starring Milton Sills and Doris Kenyon who were real-life man and wife. It was based on a novel by Peter B. Kyne. First National produced and distributed the film having gained the screen rights to the story from Famous Players–Lasky and Paramount. Paramount had made a version of the novel in 1919 with Wallace Reid, and it would again be filmed in 1938 and readapted into the 1952 film The Big Trees. A copy of this film survives at the UCLA Film & Television Archive. It is also listed as existing in an incomplete print at the Library of Congress. A 16mm copy is housed at the Wisconsin Center for Film & Theater Research.

== Cast ==
- Milton Sills as Bryce Cardigan
- Doris Kenyon as Shirley Pennington
- Arthur Stone as Buck Ogilvy
- George Fawcett as John Cardigan
- Paul Hurst as Randeau
- Charles Sellon as Pennington
- Yola d'Avril as Felice
- Phil Brady as Big Boy
- James A. Marcus as Mayor
- Erville Alderson as Councilman
- Dan Crimmins as Councilman
- Otto Hoffman as Councilman
- Lucien Littlefield as Councilman
- Dan Mason as Councilman

== Production ==
The film was shot on location in Humboldt County, California.
