= Van Damme State Park =

State park in California, United States

Coordinates: 39°16′30″N 123°46′00″W

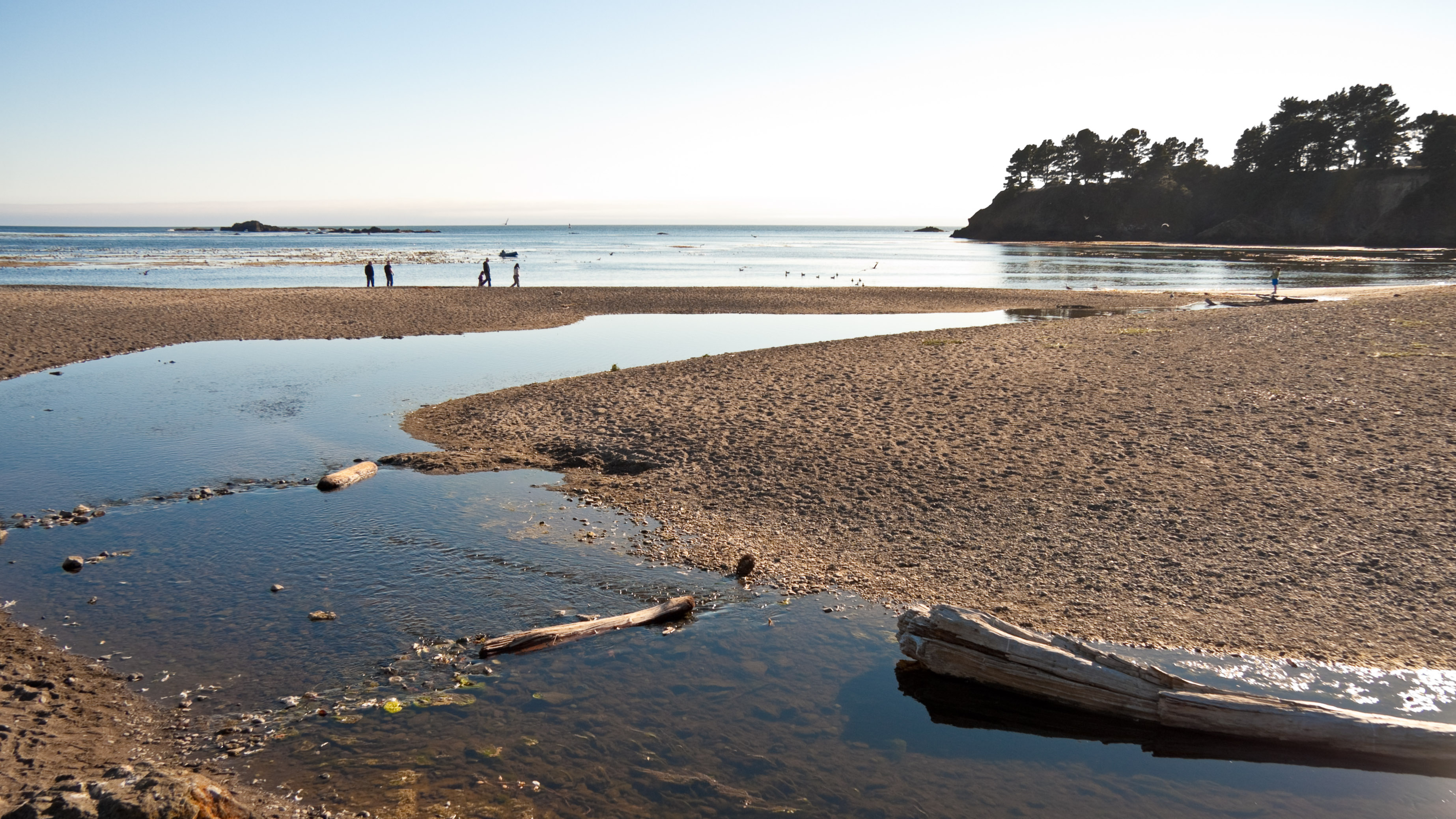
Little River beach

Van Damme State Park is a public beach consisting of about 1,831 acres (7.41 km^{2}) of land in Mendocino County, California, near the town of Little River on State Route 1. It was named for Charles F. Van Damme (1881–1934), who was born in the area and purchased the land that is now the park with profits from a San Francisco ferry business. On his death, the property became part of the California state park system.

== History ==
In 1934, the death of Charles Van Damme initiated the addition of his acquired plot of land to the State Park System. Before Charles Van Damme owned this plot of land, the Little River land was inhabited by the native Pomo people until their contact with European settlers who arrived in the early 1800s.

Throughout 1864-1893 there were lumber operations, but in 1893 there was an economic depression in the American West so the lumber operations were shut down by 1900. With the Great Depression the Civilian Conservation Corps (CCC) hired thousands of men who would work and stay in camps throughout the state parks.

== Description ==
The greater part of the park lies on the inland side of State Route 1 and includes ten miles of hiking trails along the Little River and campsites rated by the Guardian as one of the ten best on the West Coast. With the campsites there is access to the beach which is a popular spot for kayaking. This is because kayaking tours through the sea caves are offered. The sea caves are also known to divers because they are a good starting point for beginners.

On the ocean side of the highway, a free parking lot provides access to Little River Beach at the mouth of the Little River, also part of the park. The waters offshore from the beach form the Van Damme State Marine Conservation Area. The beach also serves as the launch site for kayak tours of the sea caves in the area.

Another part of the park, Spring Ranch, consists of 160 acres (0.65 km^{2}) of blufftop meadows on the ocean side of Route 1 north of Little River and a restored set of barns dating from 1860. It was purchased by the state in 1996.

Inland, a boardwalked nature trail leads through a pygmy forest, where poor soil has created a marshy ecosystem of stunted cypress and pine trees and rhododendrons. There are two pygmy forested areas within Van Damme State Park. On the north border of the park is a 5-acre (2.0 ha) parcel named in honor of Charlotte M. Hoak.

== Conservation ==
One form of conservation seen in Van Damme State Park includes the California Marine Life Protection Act (MLPA). This act focuses on marine protected areas (MPA) and began in 1999. Through this effort it leads to healthier ecosystems that are more resilient, which helps restore and conserve biodiversity. In Van Damme State Park there is one MPA and it is known as Little River Beach.

One major organization that contributed to the conservation of Van Damme State Park was the Civilian Conservation Corps (CCC), which in the early 1930s and 1940s worked along Little River. The ultimate goal of the CCC was to keep the area as natural as possible, limiting the amount of man-made additions to the landscape. To preserve salmon spawning grounds, nine fords that were originally built over the Little River to help salmon swim upstream, were removed in 1990 after it was determined that the salmon were being kept from their spawning grounds. Today you can see bridges that were built in place of fords with the original rock ends intact, while the middle of the crossings were removed to help keep the fish population strong.

== Flora and Fauna Present ==
Some of the areas throughout Van Damme State Park are moisture rich, which are conditions favorable for coast redwoods, western sword ferns, red alder, and willows.In addition to the large redwoods there is also the famous pygmy forest within the park. The pygmy forest is filled with Mendocino cypress and bishop press. These examples are small trees because the soil is acidic, nutrient deficient, and hard for the roots to grow in.

Van Damme State Park is rich in marine life including bat stars, rockfish, sea cucumbers, rock crabs, and Coho salmon. Northern spotted owls, yellow warblers, and belted kingfishers make up some of the local bird species.
