= The Man Who Dared =

The Man Who Dared may refer to:

- The Man Who Dared (1920 film), American drama directed by Emmett J, Flynn
- The Man Who Dared (1933 film), American drama directed by Hamilton MacFadden
- The Man Who Dared (1939 film), American crime drama directed by Crane Wilbur
- The Man Who Dared (1946 film), American crime drama directed by John Sturges
