= Valley of the Giants (film) =

1938 film by William Keighley

- Theatrical release poster
- Directed by: William Keighley
- Screenplay by: Seton I. Miller; Michael Fessier
- Based on: The Valley of the Giants; 1918 novel by Peter B. Kyne
- Produced by: Louis F. Edelman
- Starring: Wayne Morris; Claire Trevor; Frank McHugh; Alan Hale Sr. Donald Crisp; Charles Bickford
- Cinematography: Sol Polito
- Edited by: Jack Killifer
- Music by: Adolph Deutsch
- Color process: Technicolor
- Production company: Warner Bros. Pictures
- Distributed by: Warner Bros. Pictures
- Release date: September 17, 1938
- Running time: 79 minutes
- Country: United States
- Language: English

Valley of the Giants is a 1938 American Technicolor adventure film/lumberjack Western directed by William Keighley, written by Seton I. Miller and Michael Fessier, and starring Wayne Morris, Claire Trevor, Frank McHugh, Alan Hale Sr., Donald Crisp, and Charles Bickford. It is based on the novel The Valley of the Giants by Peter B. Kyne, which had previously been filmed as a silent in 1927. The film was released by Warner Bros. Pictures on September 17, 1938.

== Plot ==
Bill Cardigan owns a large portion of the California Redwoods. Howard Fallon along with Hendricks, Lee Roberts, Ed Morell, and Fingers McCarthy go to California and try to procure Bill's land. Howard finds out about Bill's large bank debt, and now has a way to get ownership of the forest. Accidentally the claims Howard had towards the land get destroyed in a fire giving Bill a chance to reclaim ownership. Bill must get his lumber cut and shipped within six weeks. Howard attempts to stop Bill by destroying the railroad, damming the river and locking him and Lee in the caboose of the train and sending it towards the destroyed track. Fallon gets captured and surrenders to Bill, giving him back his land.

== Cast ==
- Wayne Morris as Bill Cardigan
- Claire Trevor as Lee Roberts
- Frank McHugh as 'Fingers' McCarthy
- Alan Hale Sr. as 'Ox' Smith
- Donald Crisp as Andy Stone
- Charles Bickford as Howard Fallon
- Jack La Rue as Ed Morrell
- John Litel as Hendricks
- Dick Purcell as Creel
- El Brendel as 'Fats'
- Russel Simpson as McKenzie
- Cy Kendall as Sheriff Grabber
- Harry Cording as Greer
- Wade Boteler as Joe Lorimer
- Helen MacKellar as Mrs. Lorimer
- Addison Richards as Hewitt
- Jerry Colonna as Saloon Singer
- Stanley Blystone as Bartender (uncredited)

== Location ==
The film was shot on locations in Humboldt County, California.

== Production ==
This is the third film version of the 1919 novel with a 1919 film directed by James Cruze and a 1927 remake directed by Charles Brabin. The original film was lost up until 2010 when the film was presented to the Library of Congress by the Russian film archive Gosfilmofond.

Footage from the film was used throughout Warner Brothers' 1952 picture The Big Trees, also in Technicolor. The later film is not a precise remake, but shares useful plot points. The climactic explosion of a logjam makes use of the destruction of the bridge in Valley of the Giants. Costumes were designed to match the images in several scenes, notably when the red-shirted hero in each picture works his way along a train carrying huge cut trees in order to stop the caboose carrying his love interest from plunging into a gorge. The white shirted villain survived his battle with the hero in this picture. Alan Hale Jr. plays a lumberjack in the later film, wearing a very distinctive outfit—including a hat—like the one his father wears in this picture. The Big Trees uses the long shot from Valley of the Giants of Ox (Alan Hale Sr.) sliding down a cable to have the character played by his son accomplish the same feat.
