= Little River, California =

Little River
- Census-designated place
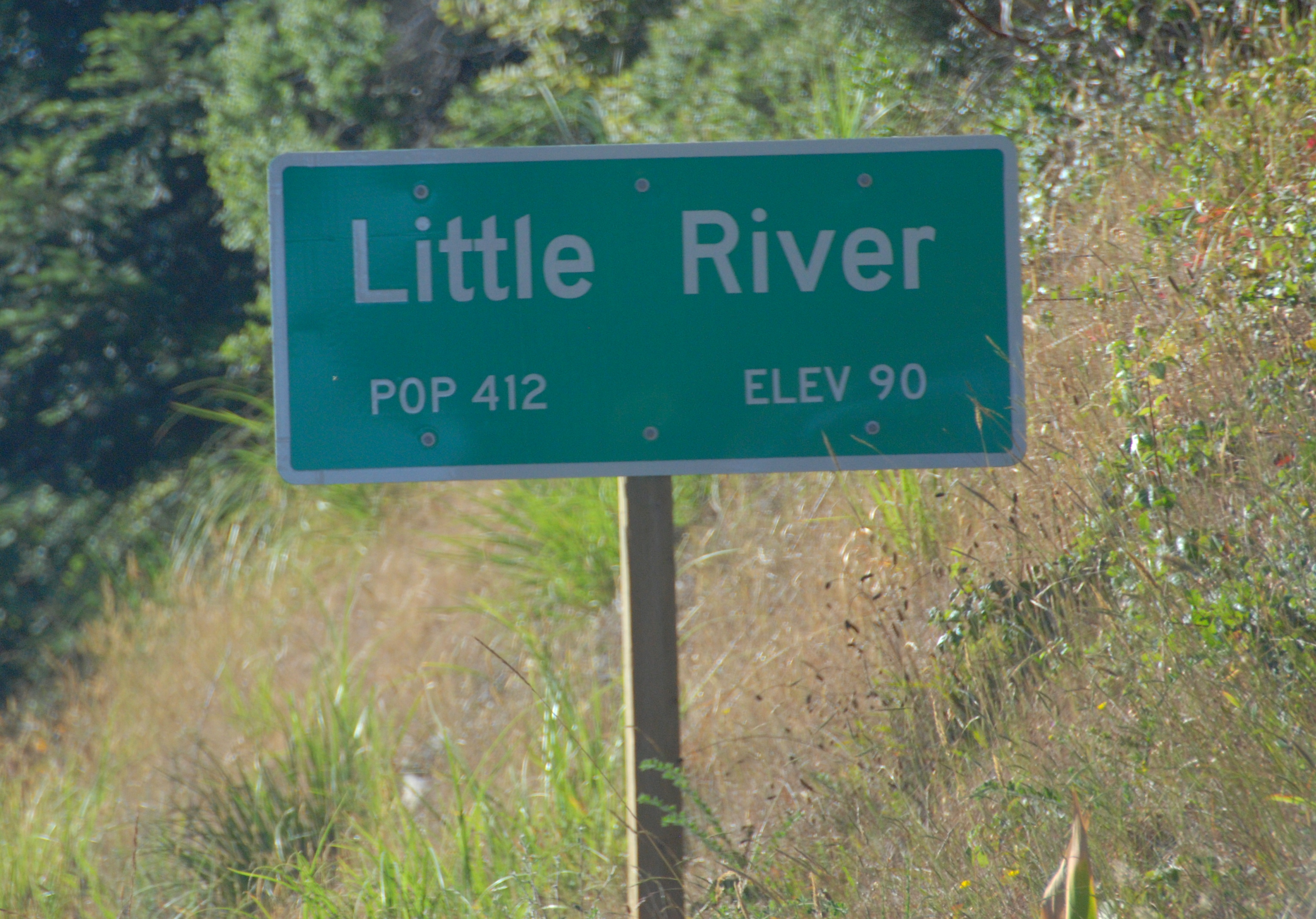
- Road sign, 5 July 2008

- Location in Mendocino County, California

- Location within California Location within the United States
- Coordinates: 39°16′15″N 123°47′18″W
- Country: United States
- State: California
- County: Mendocino

Area
  - Total: 1.672 sq mi (4.33 km^{2})
  - Land: 1.672 sq mi (4.33 km^{2})
  - Water: 0 sq mi (0 km^{2}) 0%
- Elevation: 66 ft (20 m)

Population (2020)
  - Total: 94
  - Density: 56/sq mi (22/km^{2})
- Time zone: UTC-8 (Pacific (PST))
  - Summer (DST): UTC-7 (PDT)
- ZIP Code: 95456
- Area code: 707
- GNIS feature ID: 1658981; 2628752

Little River (formerly known as Littleriver, Bell's Harbor, and Kent's Landing) is a small census-designated place in Mendocino County, California, United States. It lies at an elevation of 66 feet (20 m), 3 miles (5 km) south of the town of Mendocino and running along the Pacific Ocean coast on State Route 1. The town takes its name from the nearby Little River. The town center sits on a scenic bluff overlooking the mouth of the Little River and hosts a grocery store, two gas pumps, a post office, and a restaurant within a single structure. The population was 94 at the 2020 census, down from 117 at the 2010 census.

== Economy ==
Little River is home to several boutique inns and bed & breakfasts, making it a popular tourist stop along the Pacific Coast. The Little River area has two state parks, much ocean access and diverse recreational opportunities including ocean kayaking, hiking, and canoeing. Little River Airport with its mile-long runway is 2 miles (3 km) east of town.

The ZIP Code is 95456. The community is inside area code 707.

== History ==
Little River was first settled by three Beall men (pronounced Bell). They are thought to have arrived between 1852 and 1856 and are listed on the 1860 Mendocino County census, Big River township: Lloyd (56 years, a farmer born in Tennessee), Samuel (26 years, a farmer born in Missouri), and Harvey (24 years, a stock man born in Missouri). The Bealls joined the Moore Brothers who had preempted land and erected dwellings a short distance from the ocean north of the bay. Shortly after, in 1856, W.H. Kent purchased the Beall tract. The place was known as "Beall's Harbor" and "Kent's Landing" until 1864, when the name was changed to "Littleriver Bay". Ruel Stickney, Silas Coombs, and Tapping Reeves built a mill here, which provided the stimulus for the formation of the town of Little River. The town grew with the success of the mill so that eventually a schoolhouse, post house, shipyard, hotels, stores and blacksmith shops all established themselves here.

Little River prospered in a similar way to many other towns on the Mendocino Coast until the nearby inland timber stands faltered. In the case of Little River, the mill closed in 1893. The loss of the mill shrunk the town, and since that time it has served mainly as a tourist destination due to its beaches and Van Damme State Park, which the Little River runs through. The first road that ran through this area was the Anderson Valley and Big River Wagon Road. This road was likely widened and altered over the years until it was eventually added to the State Highway System.

The Little River post office opened in 1865, changed its name to Littleriver in 1894, closed in 1929, and re-opened as Little River in 1930.

== Geography ==
Little River is located on the western coast of Mendocino County (and the United States) along California State Route 1, 3 miles (4.8 km) south of Mendocino and 4 miles (6.4 km) north of Albion. The Little River passes through the northern part of the community, emptying into the Pacific Ocean at Van Damme Beach, part of Van Damme State Park, which extends east from the beach up the Little River valley, known as Fern Canyon.

According to the United States Census Bureau, the Little River CDP covers an area of 1.7 square miles (4.4 km^{2}), all land.

== Demographics ==
Historical population
Census	Pop.	Note	%±
2010	117		—
2020	94		−19.7%
U.S. Decennial Census; 1850–1870 1880-1890; 1900 1910 1920; 1930 1940 1950; 1960 1970 1980; 1990 2000 2010

Little River first appeared as a census designated place in the 2010 U.S. census.

The 2020 United States census reported that Little River had a population of 94. The population density was 56.2 inhabitants per square mile (21.7/km^{2}). The racial makeup of Little River was 79 (84%) White, 5 (5%) African American, 0 (0%) Native American, 3 (3%) Asian, 0 (0%) Pacific Islander, 2 (2%) from other races, and 5 (5%) from two or more races. Hispanic or Latino of any race were 6 persons (6%).

There were 44 households, out of which 25 (57%) were families and 17 (39%) were one person living alone. The median age was 67.3 years. There were 39 males and 55 females.

There were 94 housing units at an average density of 56.2 units per square mile (21.7 units/km^{2}), of which 44 (47%) were occupied year round and 46 (49%) were used seasonally. Of the housing units that were occupied year round, 34 (77%) were owner-occupied, and 10 (23%) were occupied by renters.

== Politics ==
In the state legislature, Little River is in the 2nd senatorial district, represented by Democrat Mike McGuire, and the 2nd Assembly district, represented by Democrat Chris Rogers.

Federally, Little River is in California's 2nd congressional district, represented by Democrat Jared Huffman.

== Education ==
Little River is in the Mendocino Unified School District.

== In popular culture ==
The Heritage House Inn, a bed and breakfast between Little River and Albion, was the location for the film Same Time, Next Year (1978), starring Alan Alda and Ellen Burstyn. The town itself appears in several scenes of The Dunwich Horror (1970).

== See also ==
- Little River Inn
- Rachel Binah
