= The Big Trees =

1952 film

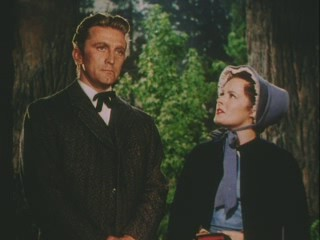
- Directed by: Felix E. Feist
- Screenplay by: John Twist and James R. Webb
- Story by: Kenneth Earl
- Produced by: Louis F. Edelman
- Starring: Kirk Douglas; Eve Miller; Patrice Wymore; Edgar Buchanan; John Archer; Alan Hale Jr.; Roy Roberts; Charles Meredith; Harry Cording; Ellen Corby
- Cinematography: Bert Glennon
- Edited by: Clarence Kolster
- Music by: Heinz Roemheld
- Color process: Technicolor
- Production company: Warner Bros. Pictures
- Distributed by: Warner Bros. Pictures
- Release dates: February 16, 1952 (Eureka, California); February 5, 1952 (New York)
- Running time: 90 minutes
- Country: United States
- Language: English

The Big Trees

The Big Trees is a 1952 American lumberjack Western film starring Kirk Douglas and directed by Felix E. Feist. It is Douglas's final film for Warner Bros. Pictures, and he performed without pay in exchange for releasing him from his long-term contract.

The film entered the public domain in 1980 when its copyright was not renewed.

== Plot ==
In 1900, lumberman Jim Fallon greedily eyes the tall redwood trees in the virgin region of northern California. A group led by Elder Bixby live there and have a religious relationship with the redwoods and refuse to log them, using smaller trees for lumber. Jim becomes infatuated with Bixby's daughter Alicia, although he plans to cheat the group. When Jim's right-hand man Yukon Burns learns the truth, he changes sides and leads the locals in resisting Jim. The locals combat Jim's loggers with a sympathetic judge, and Jim fights by using federal laws.

Elder Bixby is killed when a large sequoia tree is felled by Jim's men and falls on his cabin. Jim's desperate attempt to rescue Bixby saves him from a murder conviction.

When timber rival Cleve Gregg appears, the battle becomes a three-way fight. Gregg and his partner Frenchy LeCroix try to murder Jim but kill Yukon instead. Jim experiences a dramatic change of heart and leads the settlers in defeating Gregg and Frenchy. Jim marries Alicia.

== Cast ==
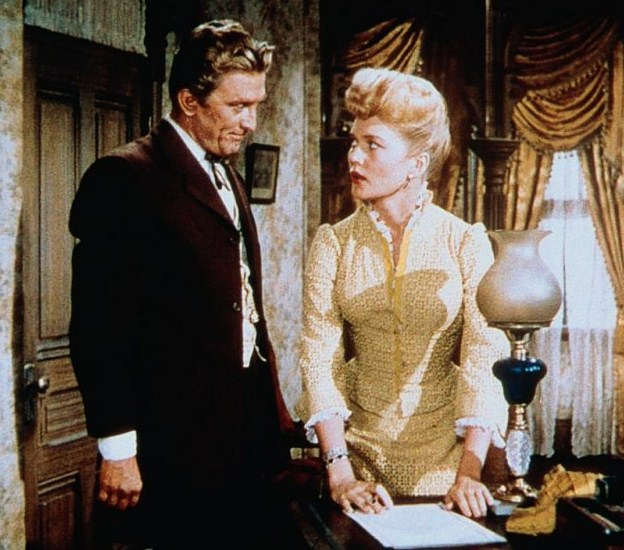
Kirk Douglas and Patrice Wymore

- Kirk Douglas as Jim Fallon
- Eve Miller as Sister Alicia Chadwick
- Patrice Wymore as Daisy Fisher
- Edgar Buchanan as Yukon Burns
- John Archer as "Frenchy" LeCroix
- Alan Hale, Jr. as "Tiny"
- Roy Roberts as Judge Crenshaw
- Charles Meredith as Elder Bixby
- Harry Cording as Cleve Gregg
- Ellen Corby as Sister Blackburn
- Duke Watson as Mr. Murdoch
- Lane Chandler as Brother Dorn
- Elizabeth Slifer as Sister Wallace
- Lilian Bond as Daisy's girl
- Michael McHale as Mr. Keller
- William Challee as Brother Williams

Students from Humboldt State University played members of the Quaker congregation and members of its choir.

== Production ==
The film was produced with the cooperation of the Hammond and Carlotta lumber companies and was shot at locations in Humboldt County, California.

Footage from Warner Bros.' 1938 Technicolor film Valley of the Giants is used throughout The Big Trees, a similar film, but the studio denied that the later film was a remake of the 1938 film, the 1927 version or the 1919 original.

== Release ==
The film's world premiere was held in the Humboldt County city of Eureka, California on February 16, 1952. The city pronounced the day as "Big Trees Day" and a parade and woodchopping competition were held. The film's stars Patrice Waymore, Eve Miller and Edgar Buchanan attended the premiere.

== Reception ==
In a contemporary review for The New York Times, critic A. H. Weiler called the film a "stormy and sometimes silly saga of lumber operators" and wrote: "[I]t is a cliché-ridden tale in which religious faith and fistic fireworks are mixed with little effect. ... It is all as virile as a crowd of studio lumberjacks can make it."
