= Korbel, Humboldt County, California =

Unincorporated community in California, United States

Korbel
- Unincorporated community
- Location in California Korbel (the United States)
- Coordinates: 40°52′13″N 123°57′30″W
- Country: United States
- State: California
- County: Humboldt
- Elevation: 154 ft (47 m)

Korbel (formerly North Fork) is an unincorporated community in Humboldt County, California, United States. It is located 1.5 miles (2.4 km) east-southeast of Blue Lake, at an elevation of 154 feet (47 m). The ZIP Code is 95550.

== History ==
In 1881, the Korbel brothers, Antone, Frank, and Joseph Korbel of Sonoma County, California acquired the Arcata and Mad River Railroad. They extended the railroad up the North Fork Mad River, where they built the Humboldt Lumber Company sawmill in 1883 with a company town for worker housing. The sawmill was the first in Humboldt County to use a kiln for drying lumber. The town was originally called North Fork, but was renamed Korbel in 1891 with the arrival of the post office. The Korbel family sold their Mad River properties to the Northern Redwood Lumber Company in 1902. Rail passenger service ended in 1931. The sawmill closed in 1933, but was reopened in 1942. In 1956 Simpson Investment Company of Washington purchased the site. Rail connection with the Northwestern Pacific Railroad was abandoned in 1985. Sawmill operations have continued into the 21st century, but few residential or commercial structures remain. Simpson operations in Korbel were spun off to sister company Green Diamond Resources. The mill was sold to Trinity River Timber in 2016; Green Diamond continues to own timberland in the area. The mill is currently owned and operated by North Forks Lumber Company.

== The Old Arrow Tree ==
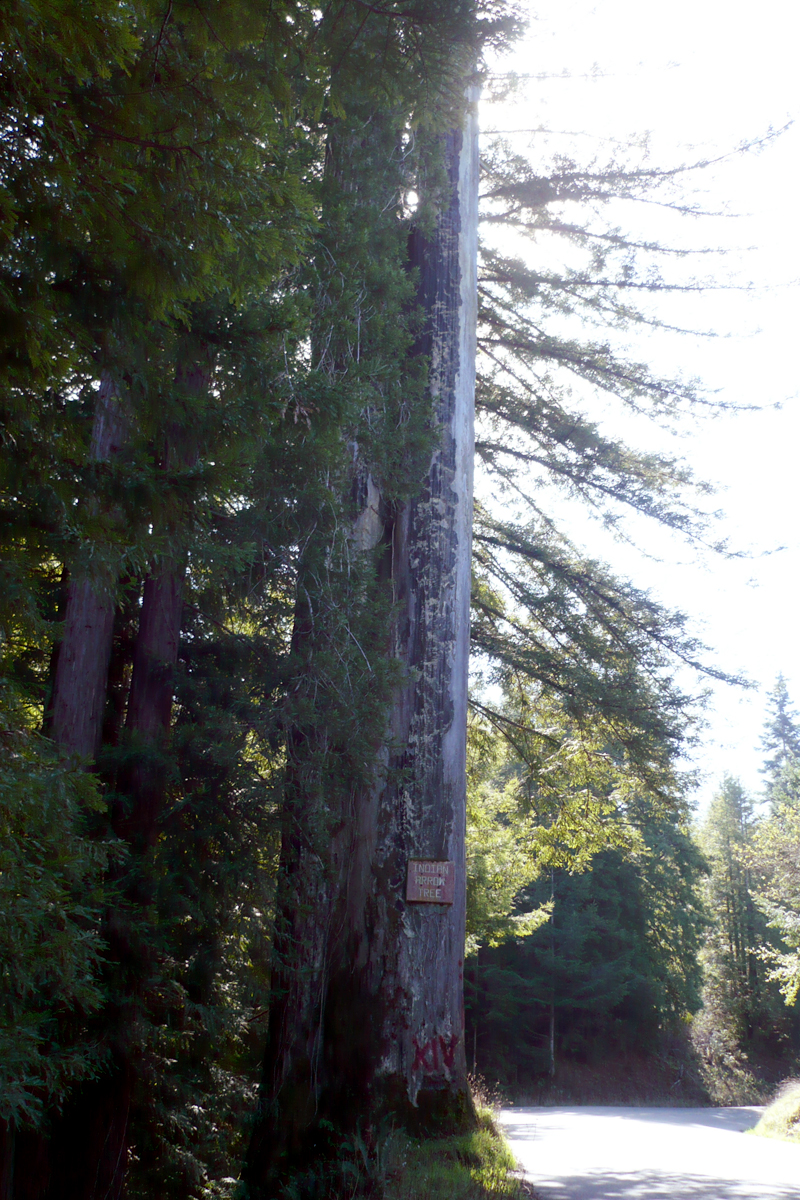
Old Arrow Tree

The Old Arrow Tree, California Historical Marker Number 164, is located 0.8 miles East of Korbel. It commemorates the site of an Indian treaty between the Hupa and the Karuk. As people passed they left arrows or other offerings in the bark, sometimes shooting the arrows into the tree.
