= Mendocino =

Mendocino may refer to:

== Places ==
- Mendocino, California, a town in Mendocino County
- Mendocino County, California, United States
- Cape Mendocino, a cape located in Humboldt County, California
- Mendocino National Forest
- Mendocino Range, a part of the Pacific Coast Mountain Range
- Mendocino Township, a former civil township in Sonoma County, California

== Music ==
- Mendocino (album), by the Sir Douglas Quintet, or its title track
- "(Talk to Me of) Mendocino", a song on the album Kate & Anna McGarrigle

== Geology ==
- Mendocino fracture zone, a seismic feature off the coast of Cape Mendocino, California
- Mendocino triple junction, a point where three tectonic plates meet

== Other uses ==
- Mendocino Brewing Company, located in Ukiah, Mendocino County, California
- Mendocino Unified School District, serving Mendocino County, California
- Mendocino (microprocessor), a code name for the second generation Intel Celeron processor
- Mendocino AVA, a California wine region

== See also ==
- Torrontés Mendocino, a grape subvariety
- Mendocino County wine, produced in California
- Mendocino Ridge AVA, a California wine region
- Mendicino (disambiguation)
