= Kelley House Museum =

Historic house and museum in Mendocino, California

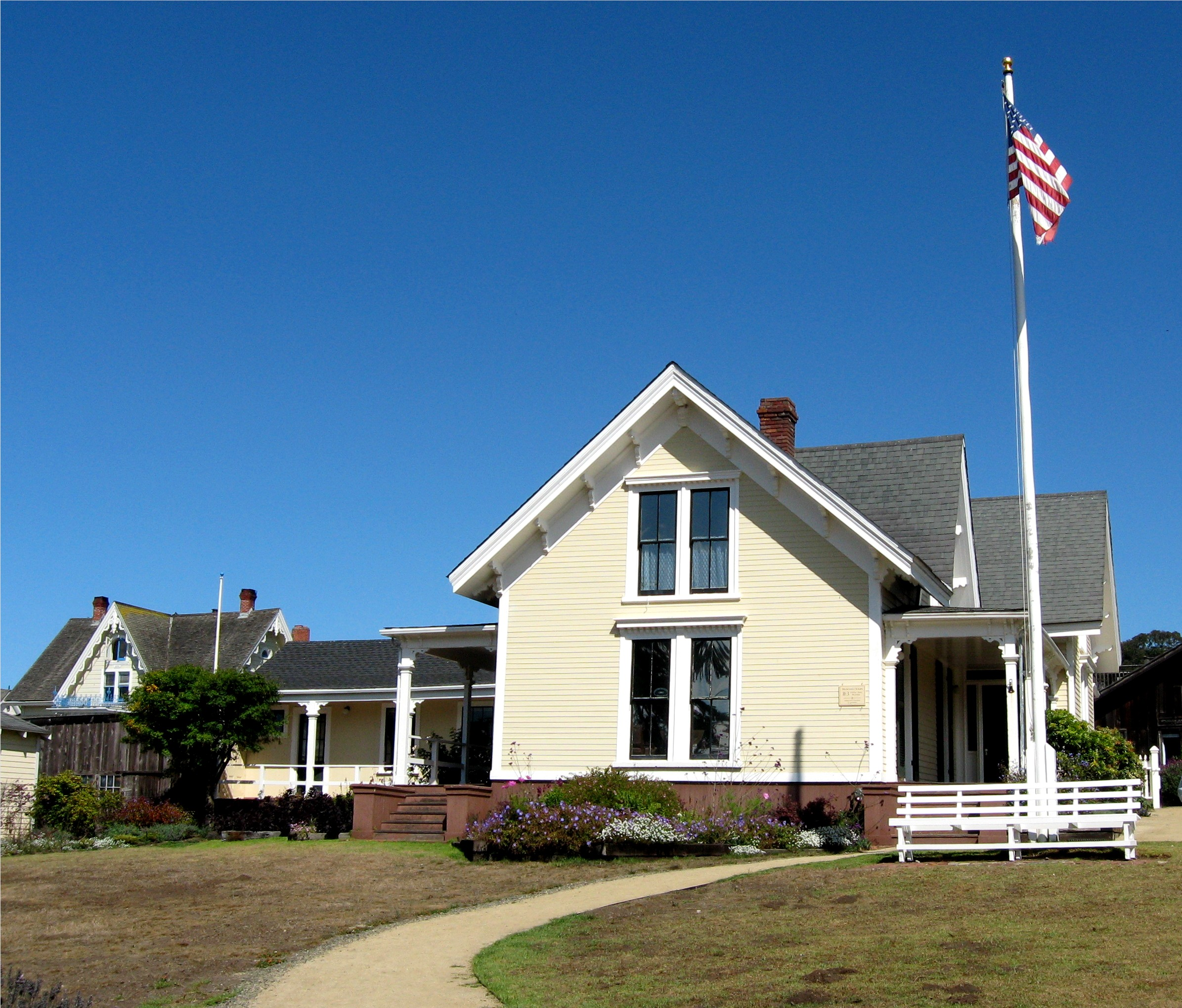
- Location: 45007 Albion Street, Mendocino, California
- Coordinates: 39.305509°N 123.799119°W
- Website: www.kelleyhousemuseum.org

The Kelley House Museum is a house museum in Mendocino, California. It is located at 45007 Albion Street in Mendocino.

Founded in 1973 with a mission "to collect, preserve, protect and share the rich history of the Mendocino Coast" it interprets Mendocino's logging and shipping industries together with displaying typical domestic life in the 1800s.

It is the starting point of a popular walking tour of Mendocino.

It has "the only museum-quality storage and research facility open to visitors on the Mendocino California Coast."

It has a cannon salvaged by sport divers in the 1960s, from the ship Frolic which was wrecked in 1850 a few miles north of Mendocino, at Point Cabrillo. Investigation of the wreck by agents of Henry Meiggs sparked the development of the timber industry in the area. Mendocino itself was founded in 1852 as a logging community for what became the Mendocino Lumber Company, and was originally named Meiggsville after Meiggs.
