= Frolic (brig) =

- U.S. National Register of Historic Places
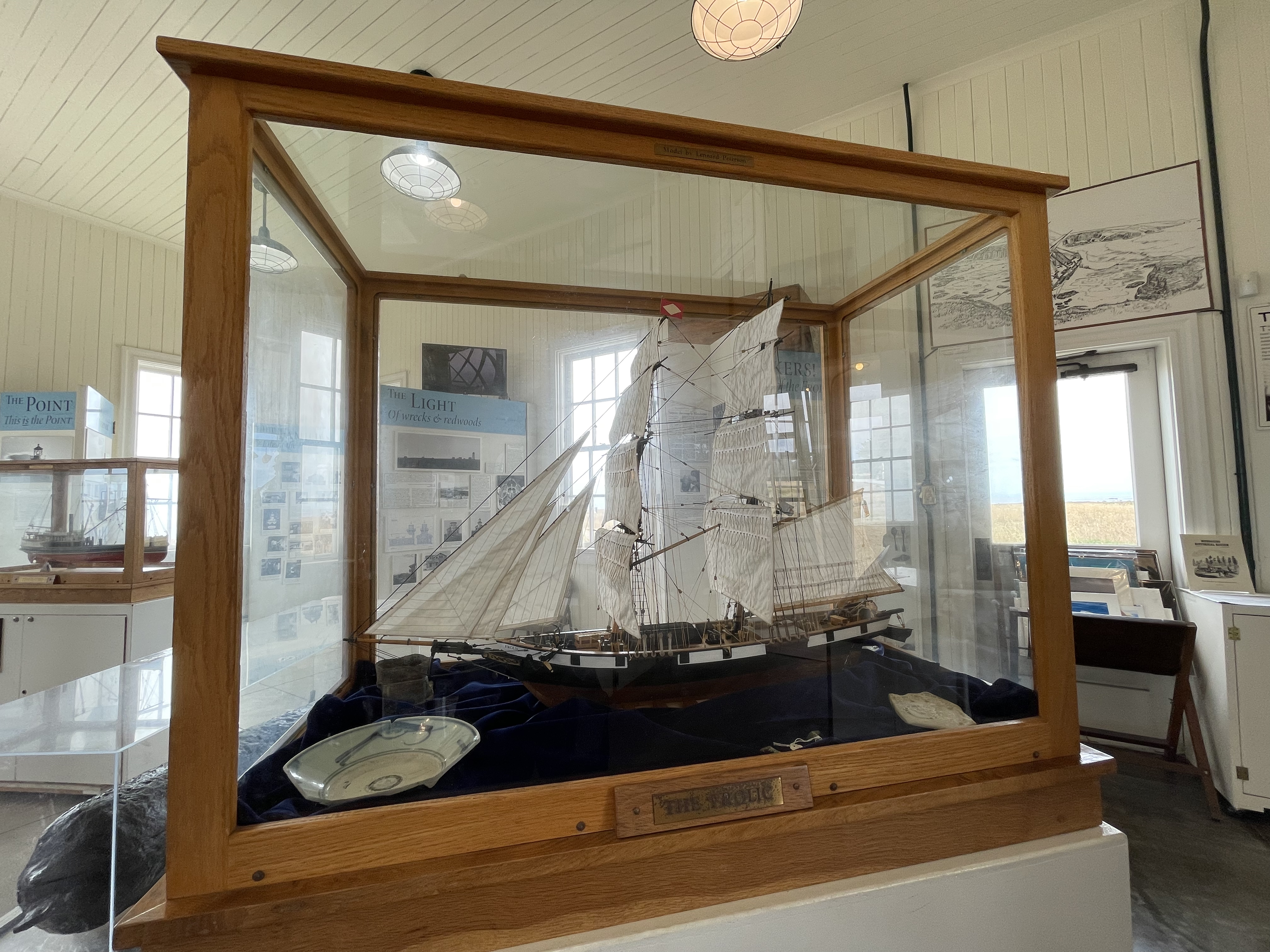
- A model of the Frolic at Point Cabrillo Light Station State Historic Park.

- Location within California
- Nearest city: Caspar, California
- Coordinates: 39°21′18″N 123°49′15″W
- Area: 3.1 acres (1.3 ha)
- Built by: Gardner, W.; Gardner, G.
- NRHP reference No.: 91000565
- Added to NRHP: May 16, 1991

The Frolic was a brig which sank northeast of Point Cabrillo, near Caspar, California. Historians have called it "the most significant shipwreck on the west coast". Its shipwreck site, later known as "Pottery Cove" or "Frolic Cove", was listed on the National Register of Historic Places as Frolic (brig) in 1991.

The ship was built in Baltimore.

It was on return from trading in China with a load of porcelain and perhaps opium when it sank.

The opium-trading brig Frolic wrecked on a reef north of Point Cabrillo, a few miles from what is now Mendocino in 1850. Agents of Henry Meiggs investigated the wreck for salvageable cargo but found that anything of value had already been taken by the local Pomo people, possibly coming from Buldam near modern Mendocino. However, their investigation led to the discovery of the coast redwood forests of the Mendocino area and the beginning of the timber trade that would drive the local economy for decades. Mendocino itself was founded in 1852 as a logging community for what became the Mendocino Lumber Company, and was originally named Meiggsville after Meiggs.

A cannon salvaged by sport divers in 1966, and other artifacts from the wreck, are on display in the Point Cabrillo Lighthouse. The cannon was moved to the lighthouse in 2003 after previously being shown in the garden of Kelley House Museum in Mendocino from 1996 to 2003.

The Mendocino County Museum is the state repository for the Frolic, including a second cannon. Dr. Thomas Layton has donated a vast collection to the Mendocino County Museum to add to its own collection

The wreckage of the Frolic was supposedly rediscovered in 1984 and was the subject of a 2003 episode of the History Channel series Deep Sea Detectives entitled "Gold Rush Disaster: The Frolic".

Point Cabrillo and the Point Cabrillo Light can be seen in background of a 1986 photo of the exact location.

== Gallery ==
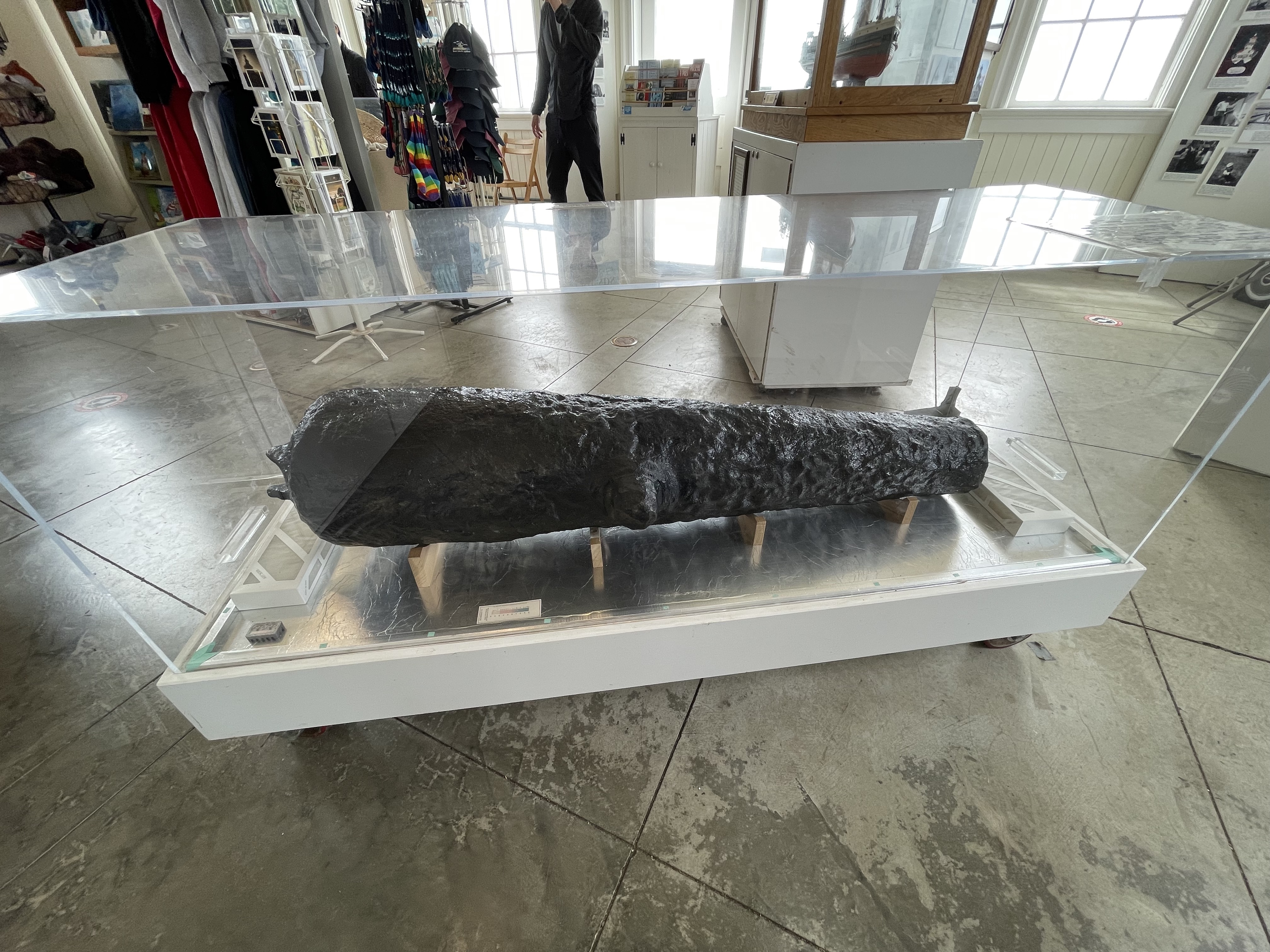
Chemically preserved 1850 cannon from the Frolic
