= Point Cabrillo =

Coordinates: 39°20′55″N 123°49′35″W

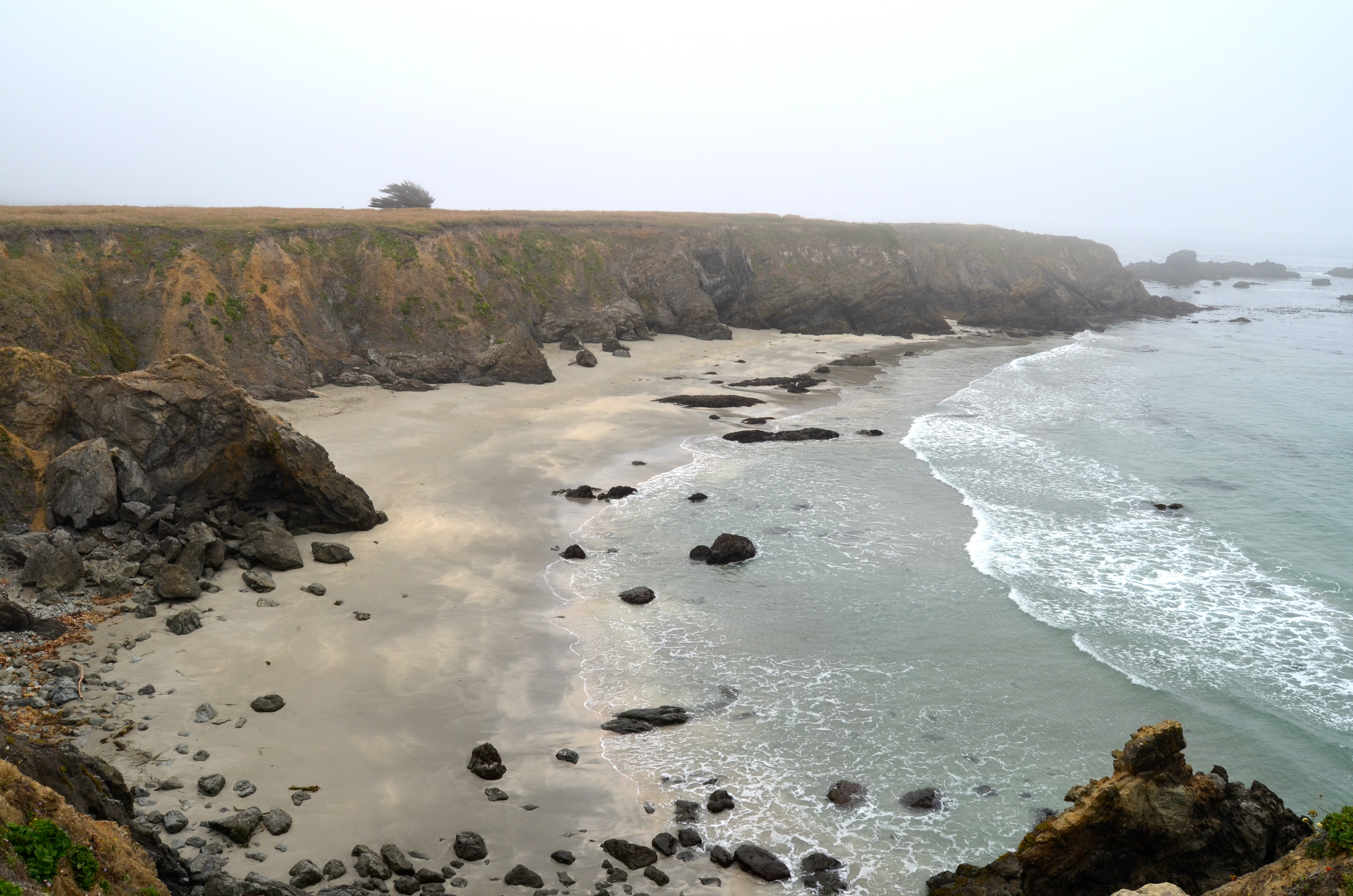
A beach on Point Cabrillo

Point Cabrillo is a sandstone headland on the Pacific Ocean coast of Mendocino County, California, between the towns of Mendocino, California and Fort Bragg, California. It is the location of the Point Cabrillo Light. Geography-wise, it lies between Point Arena headland/peninsula to the south, and Cape Mendocino, to the north (in Humboldt County).

It was named in 1870 by the United States Geological Survey after the Portuguese explorer João Rodrigues Cabrilho, although Cabrillo's voyage of exploration on behalf of Spain along the California coast did not reach as far north as the point. Because Spain controlled early California, the Spanish derivation of his name is the one used today.

The opium-trading brig Frolic wrecked on a reef just north of Point Cabrillo in 1850; the investigation of the wreck by agents of Henry Meiggs led to the discovery of the coast redwood forests of the Mendocino area and the beginning of the timber trade that would drive the local economy for decades.

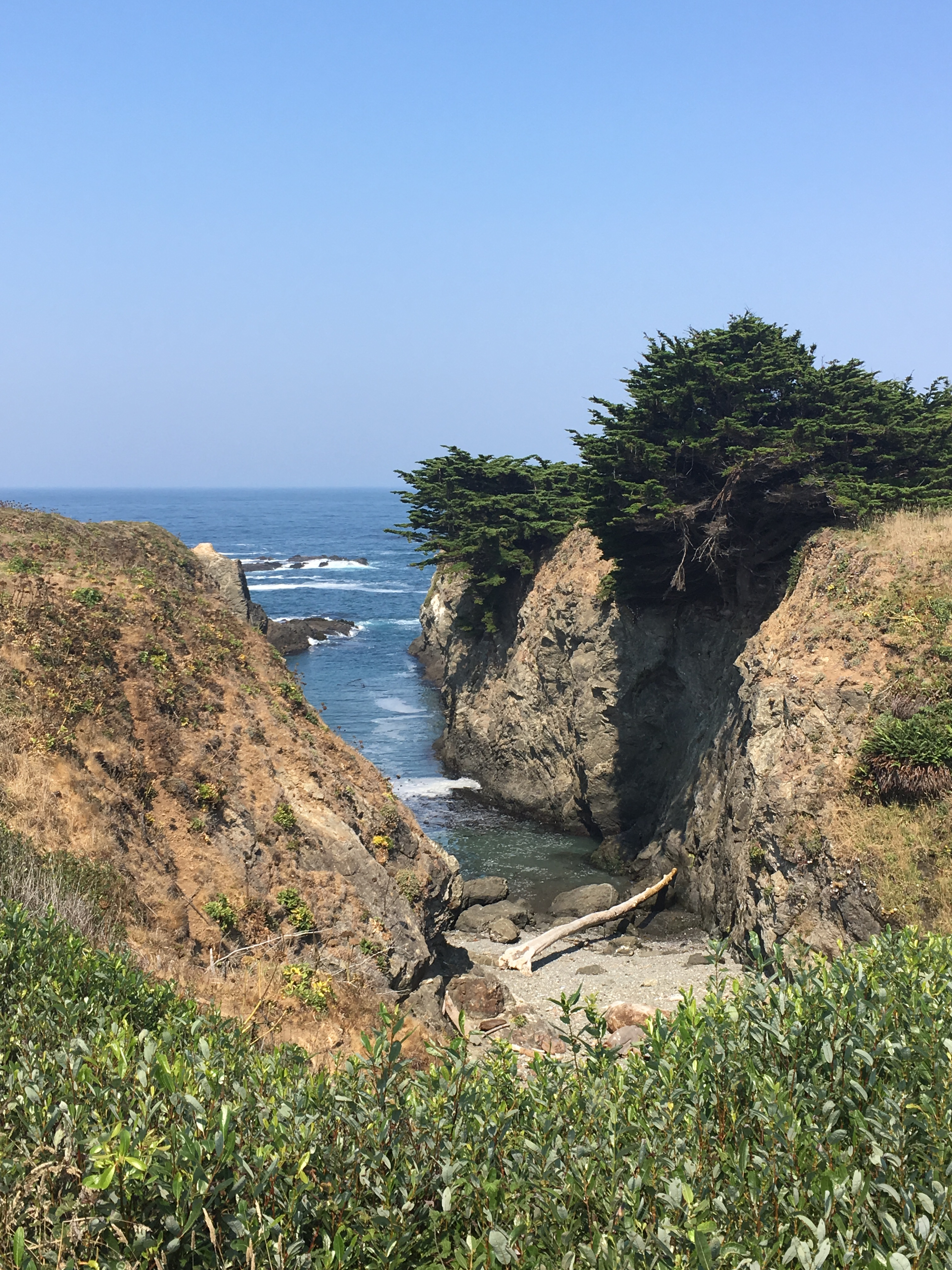

It is wholly within what is now Point Cabrillo Light Station State Historic Park.
