= Lark Camp =

World music and dance celebration with workshops

Lark Camp World Music, Song & Dance Celebration, originally called Lark in the Morning Music Celebration, is an American annual week-long world music and dance celebration that includes instructional workshops for professional and beginner musicians and dancers.

Lark Camp takes place in the Mendocino Woodlands State Park, near the coastal village of Mendocino, California.

There are three primary camps:

- Camp One is focused on Irish music, Irish dance, English folk music, including English Country Dance, Morris and Sword dance, Greek music, Greek dances, Balkan music, Bulgarian dances, and Swedish folk music,
- Camp Two is focused on Old-time music, Square dance, Cuban music, Latin dances, Tango dance, Andean music, Galician music and dance, French folk music, and Swing dances,
- Camp Three is focused on Middle Eastern music, Turkish music, Bellydance, Zimbabwean music, Samba Brazilian music and hand drumming.

There are also continuous jam sessions, and nightly dances for all participants.

== History ==
Established in 1980 by Mickie Zekley, Lark Camp was created to allow traditional musicians and dancers to exchange ideas and learn.
