= Mendicino =

Mendicino may refer to:

- Mendicino, Italy, a town in Calabria
- Mendicino (surname), an Italian surname

== See also ==
- Mendocino (disambiguation)
