= Bill Zacha =

American artist

Bill Zacha (born 1920 in Garland, Texas, died March 18, 1998, at Fort Bragg, California) was an artist and entrepreneur who founded the Mendocino Art Center in Mendocino, California, and by doing so started the artistic revival of Mendocino.

== Biography ==
Zacha studied architecture at the University of California, Berkeley, spent four years in the United States Navy entertaining troops as a writer and actor during World War II, and later made unsuccessful forays into the priesthood and drama. Returning to Berkeley to continue his architecture studies, he supported himself as a cable car conductor, but dropped out after injuring his right hand in a fall. He moved to Washington, D.C., where he studied art at the Corcoran Gallery and learned to paint left-handed. While in Texas in 1953 for a Houston exhibit of paintings he had made in Italy, he met his future wife Jennie Malone, a fashion designer. He then moved back to the San Francisco Bay Area and worked as a mail carrier while he earned a teaching credential at San Francisco State University.

The Zachas moved to Mendocino, then nearly a ghost town, in 1957, and Zacha took a job as a high school teacher. Hearing about plans to build a trailer park on the 1-acre (4,000 m^{2}) former Preston estate (one of the settings for the 1955 film East of Eden, but badly damaged in a subsequent fire), he borrowed $50 for a down payment, bought the estate for $5500, and in 1959 founded the Mendocino Art Center on the site. Zacha also ran a combination laundry/art gallery and restored many other buildings in Mendocino.

In 1964, Zacha traveled to Japan, where he met Japanese artist Tōshi Yoshida. Yoshida taught at the Mendocino Art Center in 1971, and after returning to Japan founded an art center in Miasa, Nagano based on his experiences in Mendocino. Zacha's friendship with Yoshida became the basis for a sister city relationship between Mendocino and Miasa, formalized in 1980. Zacha's series of 55 serigraphs depicting the Tōkaidō road in Japan is collected in his book Tokaido Journey (1985).
