= Buldam, California =

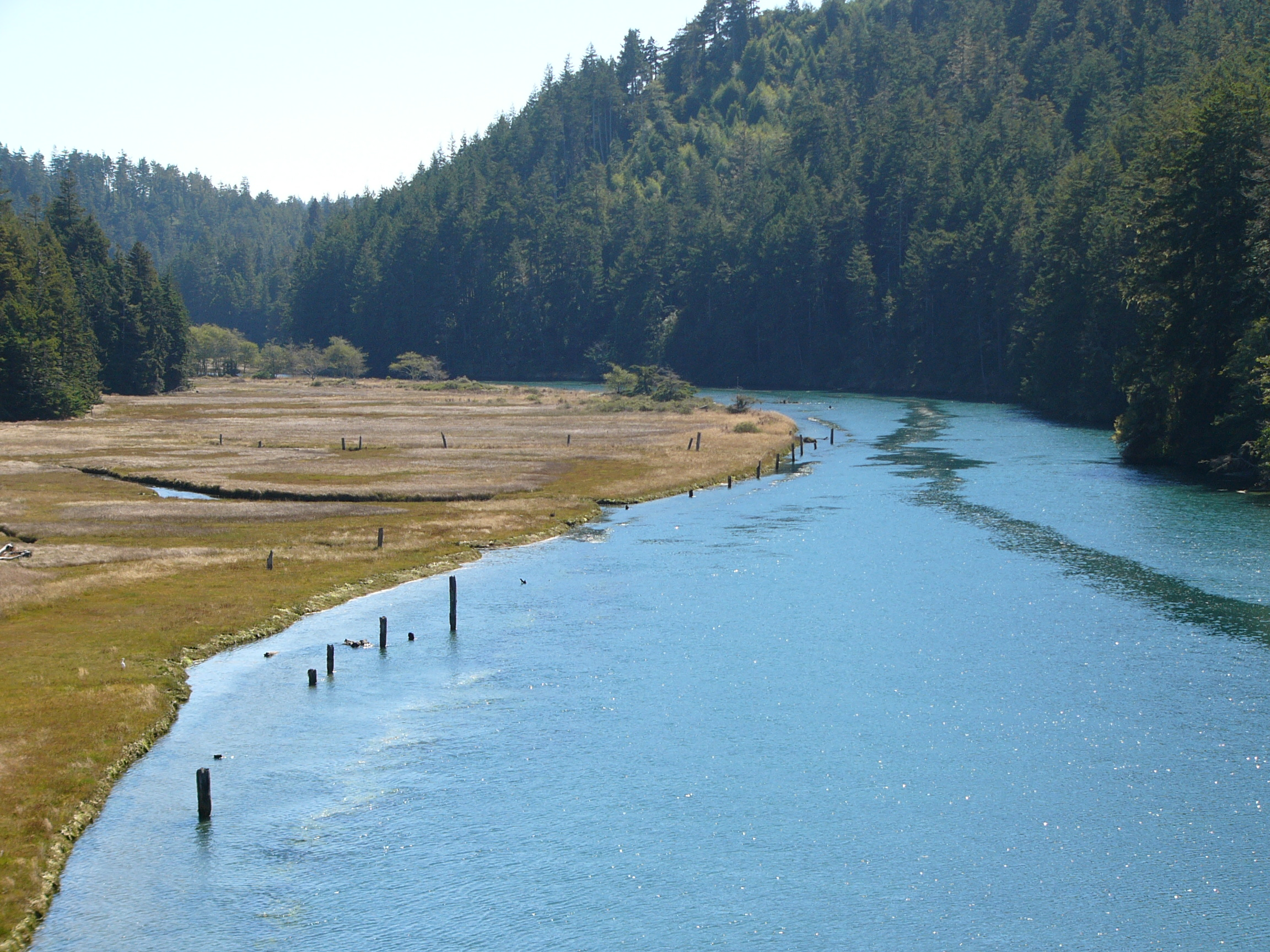
North bank of the Big River (left side of image), looking upriver from the California State Route 1 bridge across its mouth. The pilings were left later by the logging industry.

Buldam is a former Pomo settlement in Mendocino County, California, United States. It was located on the north bank of the Big River, near the mouth of the river and east of the present town of Mendocino; its precise location is unknown.

== Meaning of the name ==
Buldam, alternatively spelled Booldam or Bull Don, has been said to mean either "big river" in the Pomo language, or "big holes", referring to the blowholes on the nearby coastal bluffs. Following the standard conventions of the Pomo people, in which a community of the Pomo was named by adding "-pomo" to the name of their principal site, the community at Buldam was called Buldam-pomo.

== History ==
According to some Pomo sources, Buldam was founded c. 1851 by people from the Mitom Pomo who had been driven out of Nabo and other inland valley settlements by European settlers. Its founding sparked a war between the Mitom Pomo and the Pomo from Point Arena, possibly over ownership of the area.

However, this chronology is brought into question by other sources, who claim that cargo from the wreck of the Frolic in 1850, roughly 4 miles (6 km) north of the Big River, was salvaged by Pomo from Buldam. A different story about the cause of war between the Point Arena Pomo and the Buldam Pomo involves an incident in which one of the Point Arena Pomo was poisoned.

In 1856, the Mendocino Indian Reservation was established north of what is now Fort Bragg, and Native Americans from a wide area were forcibly taken there, and then to other reservations after it closed in 1866. By 1903, Buldam was gone; the only nearby settlements of Pomo that could be found off-reservation were in Fort Bragg, Noyo, and Little River.
