= Mendocino Woodlands State Park =

- U.S. National Register of Historic Places
- U.S. National Historic Landmark
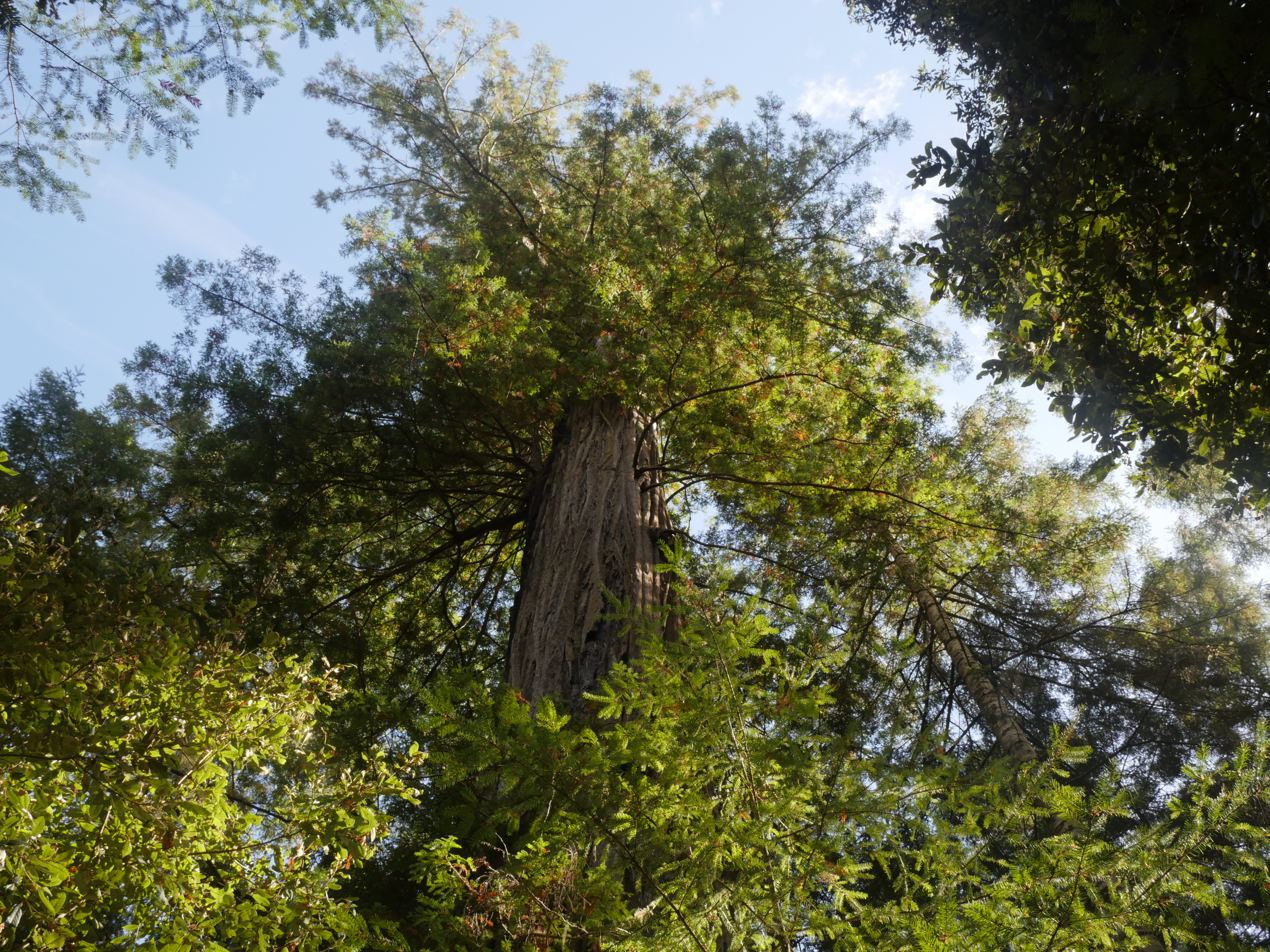

- Location within California Location within the United States
- Nearest city: 39350 Little Lake Road, Mendocino, California
- Coordinates: 39°19′43″N 123°41′54″W
- Area: 700 acres (2.8 km^{2})
- Built: 1934
- Architect: Daniel R. Hull, Raymond E. Floyd
- Architectural style: Bungalow, Craftsman
- NRHP reference No.: 97001262
- Added to NRHP: September 25, 1997

The Mendocino Woodlands State Park is a group camping facility located at 39350 Little Lake Road, Mendocino County, California, seven miles (11 km) inland from the town of Mendocino. It was built as a Recreational Demonstration Area by the Civilian Conservation Corps. Mendocino Woodlands consists of approximately 700 acres (2.8 km^{2}) of land along the Little North Fork of the Big River and is surrounded to the north, east, and west by the 50,000-acre (200 km^{2}) Jackson Demonstration State Forest. To the south, the park abuts the Big River State Park. It was declared a National Historic Landmark on September 25, 1997.

== History ==
Mendocino Woodlands was one of forty-six campgrounds (including Camp David) created by the Works Progress Administration and the Civilian Conservation Corps in the 1930s. Its rustic wood-and-stone buildings, built by the WPA are surrounded by second-growth redwood forest. Like the other campgrounds, Mendocino Woodlands was originally planned as a site for youth summer camps in which the participants would be introduced to the wonders of nature. However, Mendocino Woodlands is the only one of the campgrounds that has been continuously used for public camping.

As originally formed, the campsite occupied a property of 5,425 acres (22 km^{2}). However, when the campsite was conveyed to the California State Park system by Senate Bill 1063 in 1976, the size of the property was reduced to approximately 700 acres (2.8 km^{2}), with the remaining area left in the control of the California Department of Forestry, now Cal Fire. In 1997, the Mendocino Woodlands Recreation Demonstration Area was designated as a National Historic Landmark.

== Wildlife ==
Mendocino Woodlands is a forest of coast redwoods, sprinkled with willow, alder, tanoak, and madrone trees. It is home to mountain lions (Puma concolor), Northern-spotted owls (Strix occidentalis caurina), and Cooper's hawks (Accipiter cooperii). Navarro river that runs through the park is used by salmon, river otters, and beavers.

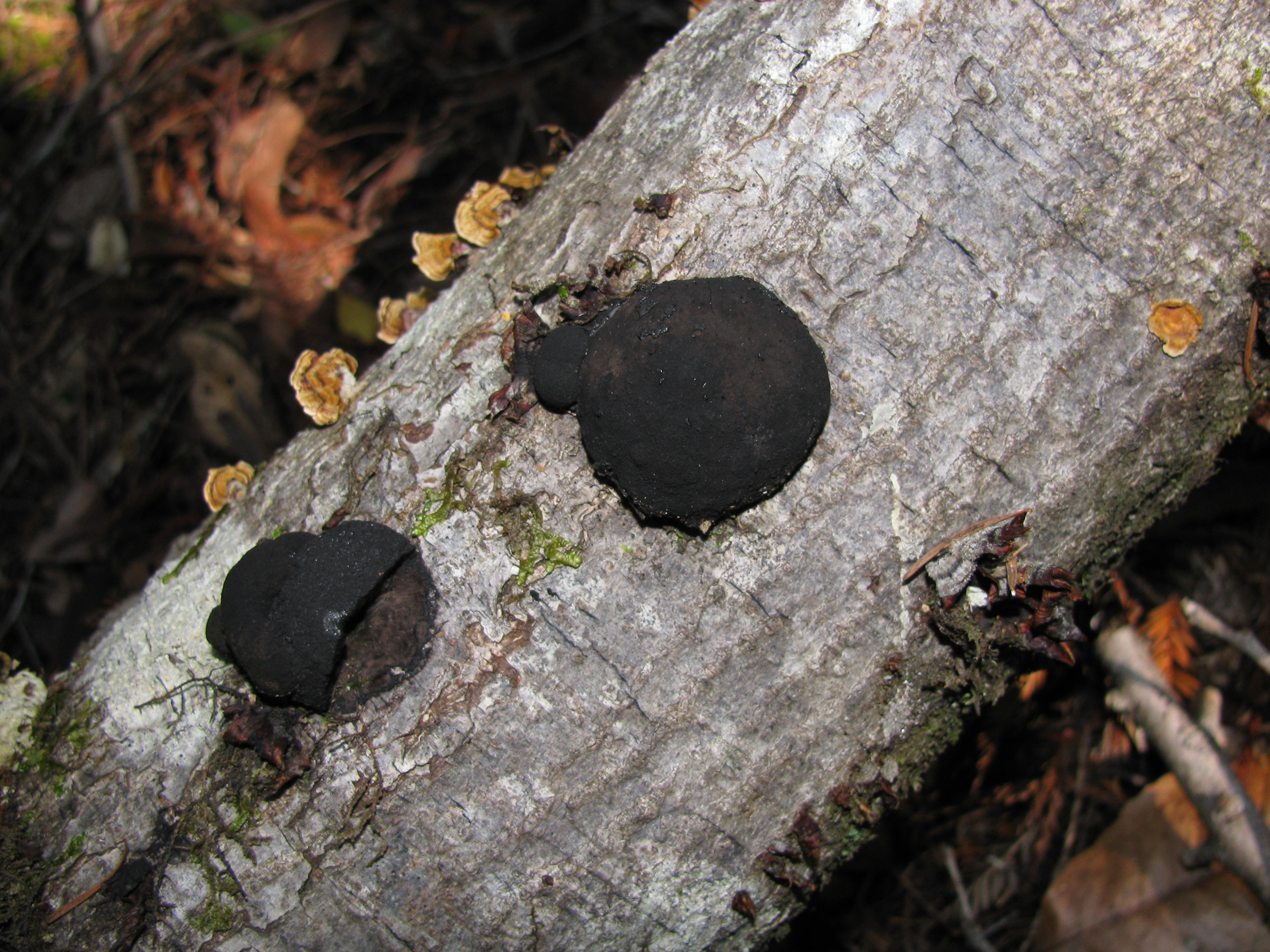
Annulohypoxylon thouasianum

Additionally, a wide variety of mushroom species grow alongside the redwoods, which are especially abundant during the rainy season. These include lobster mushroom (Hypomyces lactifluorium), red coral (Ramoria araiospora), and velvet-footed pax (Tapinella atritomentosa). Pictured on the left is a fungus which can be found on hardwoods such as tanoak.

== Management ==
The Mendocino Woodlands State Park is managed by Mendocino Woodlands Camp Association, a nonprofit corporation that has operated and maintained the facilities at the park since 1948.

== See also ==
- Lark Camp
