= Mendocino Range =

Coastal mountain range of California, USA

The Mendocino Range is one of several coastal mountain ranges which compose the Pacific Coast Range. This massive range of coastal mountains was formed during a period of coastal orogeny, millions of years ago. The Mendocino Range is a component of the California Coast Ranges of California. The Klamath Range is north of this region, and the Cascade Range runs to the northeast.

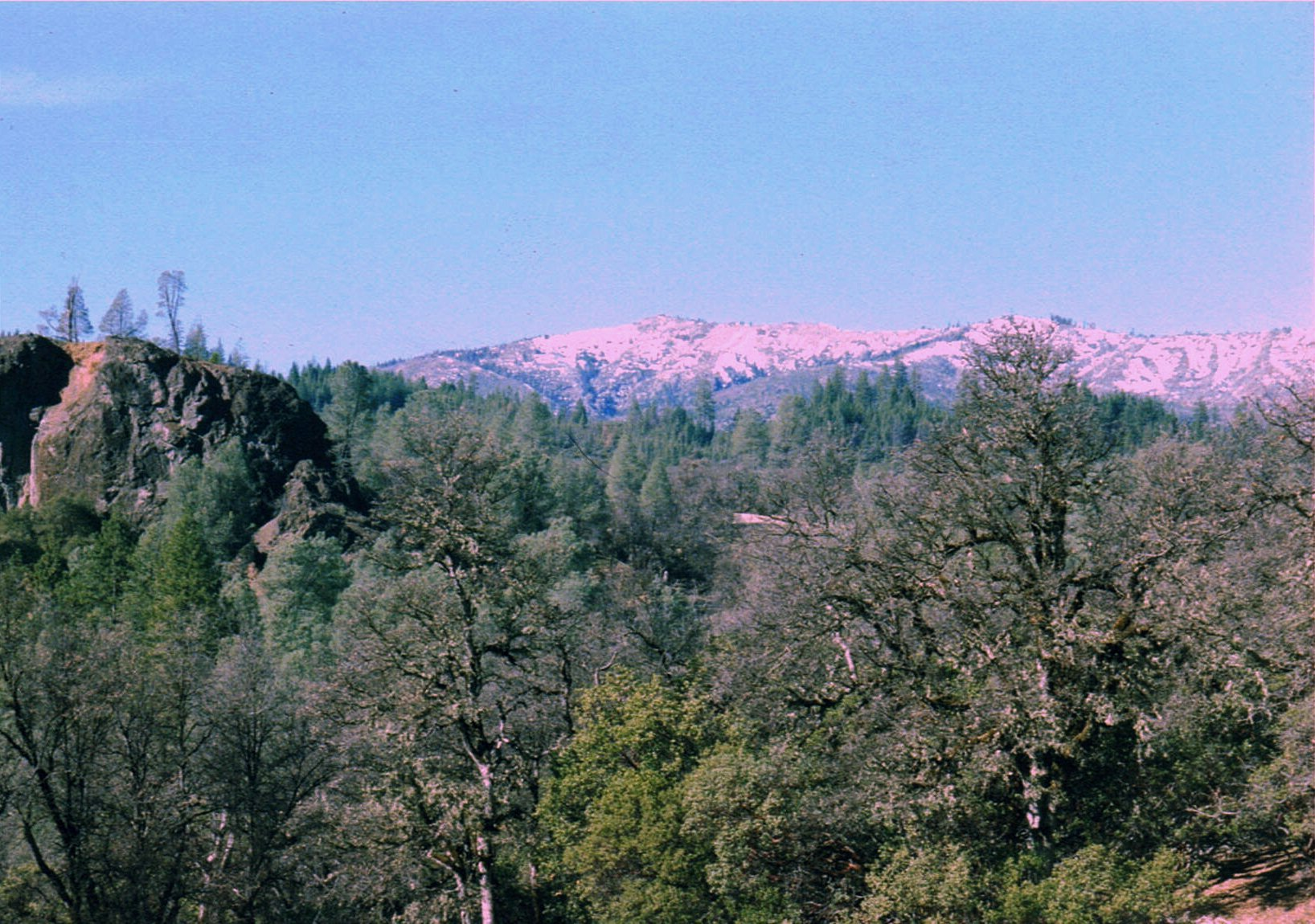
Sanhedrin Mountains in the Mendocino Range with California mixed evergreen forest habitat.

The Mendocino Range rises from the California North Coast in southern Humboldt County, to include Bear Mountain, Rainbow Ridge and Gypsy Mountain of the Mattole Range, and Grasshopper Peak, which is the dominant mountain within Humboldt Redwoods State Park. This area is extremely beautiful, with huge stands of giant old growth, including the coast redwood, Douglas fir, and grand fir. The Avenue of the Giants is a particularly scenic route, providing for car touring of the redwood forest. The Mendocino Range continues south into Mendocino County, to include a mountainous region to the east including the Mendocino National Forest and Yolla Bolly–Middle Eel Wilderness along the Middle Eel. Westward, nearer the coast, the Mendocino Range can best be seen by following Highway 1. Scenic vistas include Gilham Butte, the Chemise and Red Mountains along the South Fork of the Eel River, and Cahto Peak, near Leggett. These mountains form a rugged terrain that includes Rattlesnake Pass and other mountains along U.S. Route 101. This mountainous terrain continues south to include Jackson State Forest and the Big River watershed, near Ft. Bragg and Mendocino, with elevations from sea level to 1710 feet, and the area around Ukiah, to include English Ridge, the Sanhedrin Mountains, the Snow Mountain Wilderness, and Cache Creek. Further south, these mountains gradually become smaller and less rugged, transforming themselves into the Mayacamas Mountains, the Sonoma foothills, and the wine country of the Russian River.

The Mendocino Range is home to a wide variety of interesting plant and animal species, including elk, black bear, coho and Chinook salmon, steelhead, coastal cutthroat trout, marbled murrelet, northern spotted owl, bald eagle, and large communities of sword fern and other unique rainforest species. It contains several large protected forested areas, and is a large part of our national treasure of natural resources.
