= Big River (California) =

River in Mendocino County, California (USA), south of Mendocino Village

Big River Arroyo Grande
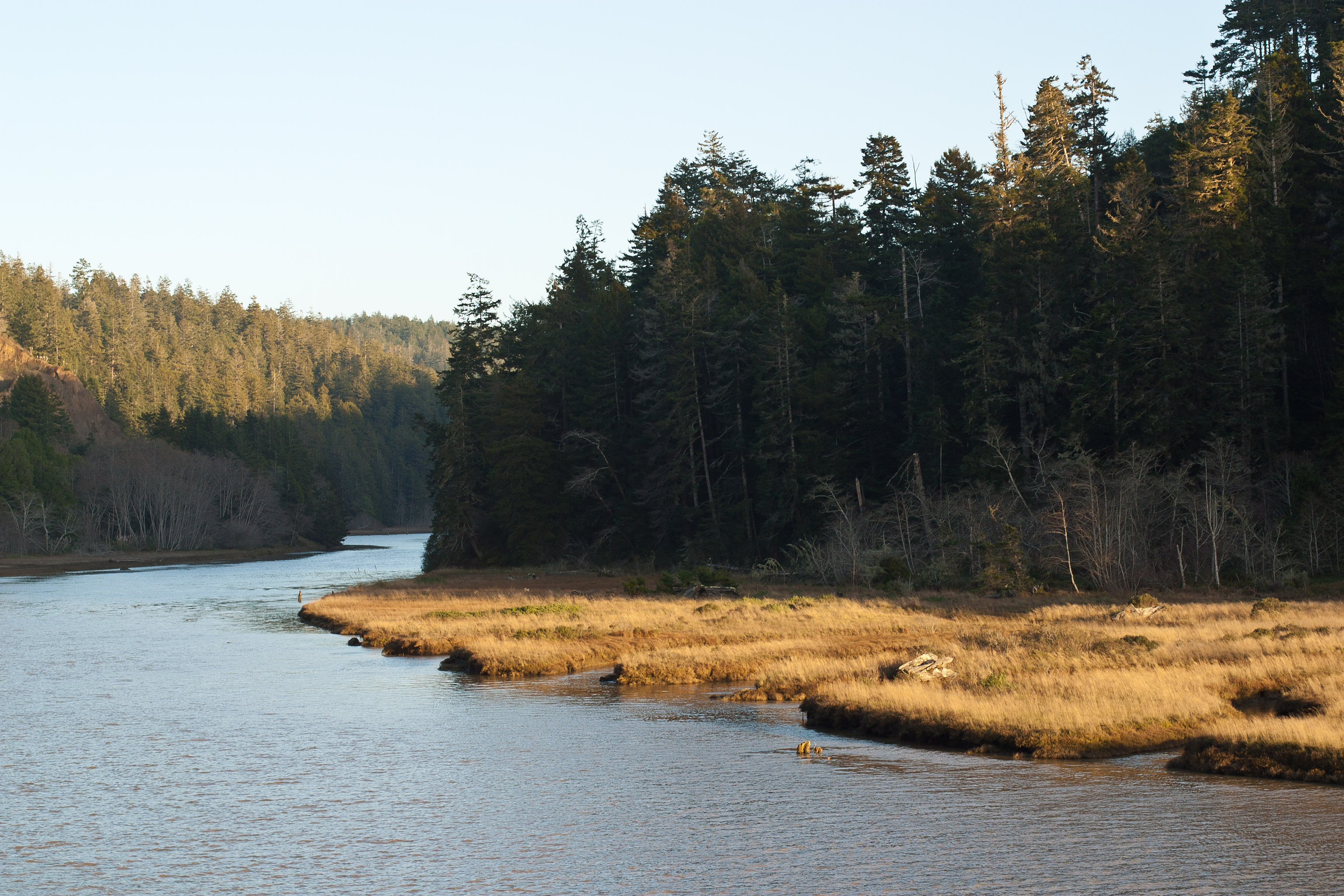
- Big River, from the Big River Unit of Mendocino Headlands State Park

Location
- Country: United States
- State: California
- County: Mendocino County

Physical characteristics
- Source: Impassable Rocks
  - location: 7 mi (11 km) south of Willits, California
  - coordinates: 39°19′3″N 123°22′23″W
- Mouth: Pacific Ocean
  - location: Mendocino, California
  - coordinates: 39°18′8″N 123°47′41″W
  - elevation: 0 ft (0 m)
- Basin size: 181 mi^{2} (470 km^{2})

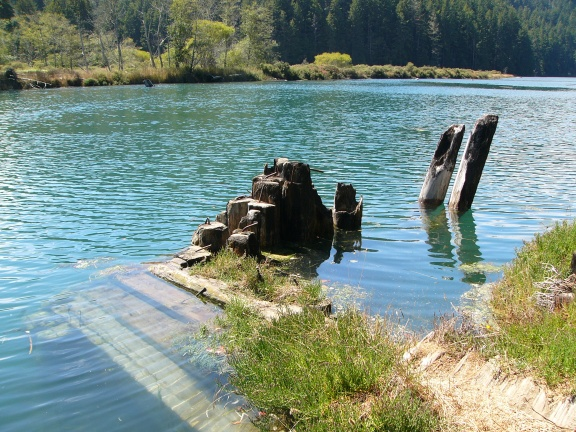
Remains of old logging boom

The Big River is a 41.7-mile-long (67.1 km) river in Mendocino County, California, that flows from the northern California Coast Range to the Pacific Ocean at Mendocino, Mendocino County, California. From the mouth, brackish waters extend 8 miles (13 km) upstream, forming the longest undeveloped estuary in the state.

== History ==
Pre-European contact, the lands about the Big River belonged to the Me-tum’mah, or Mitom Pomo. This sub-tribe of the Northern Pomo lived in the area of Little Lake Valley near Willits and claimed the coast from south of the Noyo River at what is now Fort Bragg, to just north of the Navarro River, eighteen miles south. They had a settlement, Buldam, on the north bank of the river, near its mouth, but its exact location is unknown and stories about its date of settlement are conflicting.

Big River was named for the giant redwoods that once lined its banks; it's shown as Arroyo Grande on a diseño of the Albion Mexican land grant of October 30, 1844.

The timber industry has dominated the area since the 1850s, when the first mill was constructed in what was then known as Mendocino City (now Mendocino). The mill was constructed on the bluffs overlooking the river mouth with an apron chute to load finished wood onto ships was constructed at the mill. Splash dams were built on the river and their floodgates were opened every winter to sweep logs downstream to booms which kept the logs from floating out to sea. This method of log transport increased erosion, removed woody debris, and buried cobble substrates. Logging practices especially impacted the estuary, which served as a mill pond from 1852 to 1938.

== Watershed and Course ==
The Big River watershed drains 181 square miles (470 km^{2}), from the northern California Coast Range to the Pacific Ocean at the town of Mendocino, about 10 miles south of Fort Bragg. The Big River watershed borders the watersheds of the Noyo River to the north, the Eel and Russian rivers to the east, and the Little, Albion, and Navarro rivers to the south.

The river's headwaters start in the Mendocino Range, part of the California Coast Range at an elevation of approximately 2800 ft (865m), 30 miles (48 km) inland from the Pacific Ocean. The headwaters are partially fed by Montgomery Creek as it flows through the upland riparian habitat and virgin redwoods of Montgomery Woods State Reserve. From there, the river flows roughly west through Jackson Demonstration State Forest. The lower portions of the river pass through Mendocino Woodlands State Park and the Big River Unit of Mendocino Headlands State Park before reaching the mouth of the river at the Pacific Ocean just south of the town of Mendocino.

The Big River Estuary is the longest undeveloped estuary in the state. From the mouth, ocean salinities reach 8.3 miles (13.4 km) upstream in the summer and 3 miles (5 km) in the winter, when freshwater flows are greatest. The estuary has long been of conservation interest for its beauty and natural resources. The U.S. Fish and Wildlife Service nominated the estuary for protection in 1980 under the Unique and Nationally Significant Wildlife Ecosystem Program. Although the nomination did not garner the desired protections, the estuary did receive protection in 2002, when the Mendocino Land Trust purchased a 7,334 acre parcel from the Hawthorne Timber Company. The land was donated to California State Parks as part of the Mendocino Headlands State Park. In 2010, the estuary waters were designated as a State Marine Conservation Area under the Marine Life Protection Act.

== Habitat and ecology ==
The Big River is fed by precipitation, 90 percent of which falls between October and April. Annual precipitation averages 40 inches (1,000 mm) on the coast at Fort Bragg and 51 inches (1,300 mm) inland at Willits. Winter weather is characterized by low intensity rain. The summers are dry and cool, with coastal fog. The river provides recreation and groundwater recharge for agricultural and industrial water use for the community of Mendocino, California.

The Big River provides wetland habitat for wildlife and cold freshwater habitat for fish migration and spawning. The anadromous salmonid populations native to the Big River are all listed as endangered or threatened under the federal Endangered Species Act. These include: coho salmon (Oncorhynchus kisutch), chinook salmon (Oncorhynchus tshawytscha), and steelhead trout (Oncorhynchus mykiss). Other native fishes include the anadromous Pacific lamprey (Lampetra tridentata), sculpins (Cottus spp.), three-spined stickleback (Gasterosteus aculeatus), and the Sacramento sucker (Castomus occidentalis).

The Big River Estuary provides essential wetland habitat and has potential to provide critical salmonid habitat. The strong marine influences in the Big River Estuary are tied to a diversity of fishes. Pacific Herring (Clupea pallasi) lay their eggs in the estuary, shiner surfperch (Cymatogaster aggregata) and Bay Pipefish (Syngnathus leptorhynchus) give birth in the estuary, and juvenile English Sole (Pleuronectes vetulus) and copper rockfish (Sebastes caurinus) migrate to the estuary to rear. Many marine fish species also enter the estuary seasonally to feed, such as night smelt (Spirinchus starski), while a variety of coastal species pass in and out of the estuary year-round, including cabezon (Scorpaenichthys marmoratus), tidepool sculpin (Oligocottus maculosus), and kelp greenling (Hexogrammos decagrammus).

California golden beaver (Castor canadensis subauratus) were restored to Big River in the early to mid-twentieth century despite extirpation in the California Fur Rush of the late eighteenth and early nineteenth centuries. A specimen was collected by J. G. Hall 10 miles (16 km) east of Mendocino on the Big River at elevation 200 feet (61 m) (precise location 39.31148, -123.6396) in 1966 for the California Academy of Sciences mammal collection. Beaver ponds help restore salmonid habitat by capturing sediment and improving water quality, providing pools for juvenile salmonid over-summering, raising water tables which recharge streams in the dry season, increasing the area of aquatic and riparian habitat providing fish cover, and attenuating flashy storm flows. A recent comprehensive literature review of the effects of beaver impoundments on fish illustrates that loss of beavers was directly related to significant population declines of now threatened or endangered California salmonids, including three species listed under the Endangered Species Act: Coho salmon (Oncorhynchus kisutch) (endangered), steelhead (Oncorhynchus mykiss) (threatened) and Chinook salmon (Oncorhynchus tshawytscha) (threatened).

Other semi-aquatic mammals living in Big River include river otter (Lontra canadensis) and mink (Neogale vison).

== Land Use ==
Timber production is the primary land use in the area. The California Lumber Company built the first sawmill on the Mendocino County coast at the mouth of the river in 1852. By 1873, the name had changed to Mendocino Lumber Company and the mill was the most important in Mendocino County. The mill operated until 1931, and was briefly reopened in 1938 to mill logs salvaged when a log raft broke up off the coast. Logs were transported either to the mill pond during annual water release at the splash dams, or directly to the mill via a railway that extended 9 miles (14 km) up the Big River.

The North Fork Big River was logged by the Caspar Lumber Company. Logs were transported 35 miles (56 km) to the sawmill in Caspar from Camp 20 at California State Route 20 (milepost MEN 17.3) by Caspar, South Fork and Eastern Railroad. Caspar Lumber Company timberlands became the Jackson Demonstration State Forest in 1955. Jackson State Forest forms roughly a third of the area in the watershed, and land owned by Mendocino Redwood Company, Pioneer Resources, Hawthorne Timber Company and Weger Holdings make up most of the rest. As with most watersheds on the northern California Coast, the most significant ecological problem in the area is increased erosion caused by logging, leading to excessive sedimentation in the river and its tributaries. Consequestly, the Big River has been listed as sediment and temperature impaired since 2003 under section 303(d) of the Clean Water Act. Legacy log jams also continue to block upstream migration for spawning salmonids. Current management of the Big River watershed aims to improve salmonid habitat while maintaining timber harvest through improved timber harvest practices. Modern timber harvest practices and regular road maintenance have led to reduced sedimentation and allowed continued harvest in 55% of the watershed.

== See also ==
- List of rivers in California
