= Mendocino Headlands State Park =

Park in Mendocino, California

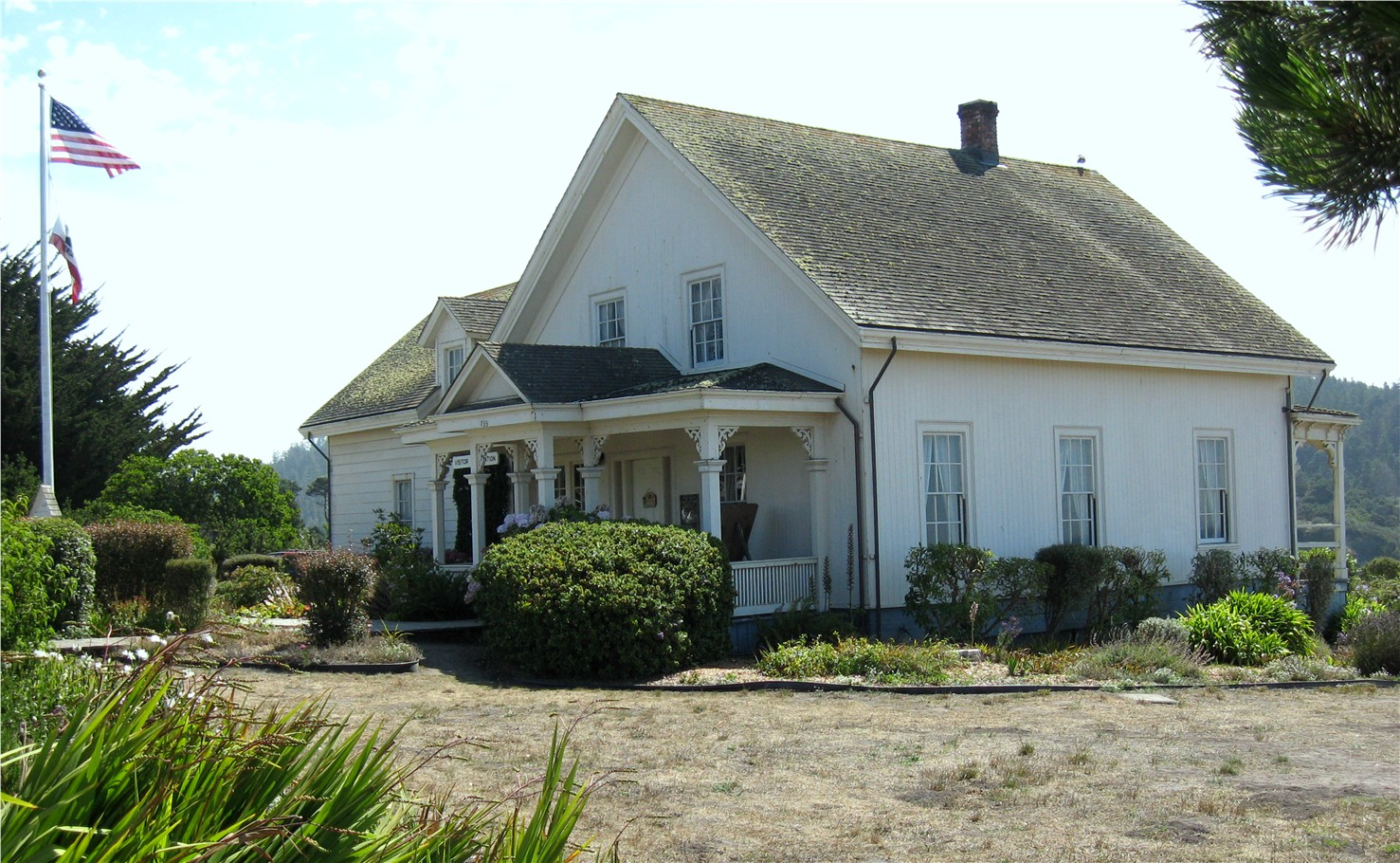
- Ford House Museum

- Location within California Location within the United States
- Location: Mendocino County, California, United States
- Nearest city: Mendocino, California
- Coordinates: 39°18′30″N 123°48′20″W
- Area: 347 acres (140 ha)
- Established: 1974
- Governing body: California Department of Parks and Recreation

Mendocino Headlands State Park is a California State Park in Mendocino, California. It consists of 347 acres (1.4 km^{2}) of undeveloped seaside bluffs and islets surrounding the town of Mendocino, two beaches (Big River Beach and Portuguese Beach), and the much larger Big River Unit stretching for eight miles (13 km) along both banks of the nearby Big River.

The park began operation in 1974, after several years of concern and discussion from citizens about the possibility of blufftop development. The Big River Unit was added in 2002.

== Headlands ==
The headlands are rocky bluffs overlooking the Pacific Ocean surrounding Mendocino. The section of headlands along the south side of Main Street in Mendocino is narrow and covered by blackberry and rose brambles. To the west and north of town, the headlands widen to a region of coastal prairie crossed by Heeser Road and several footpaths.

Ford House Museum, at the eastern end of the town of Mendocino on the headlands side of Main Street, is the park headquarters and visitor center. It offers information and videos about the history and biology of the Mendocino area, including the town's boom in the logging era, the migration of the gray whales, and a scale model of the town as it was in 1890. Guided walks on the headlands are also available.

The Mendocino Music Festival is held on the headlands in July.

== Beaches ==
Mendocino Headlands State Park contains two publicly accessible beaches.

Big River Beach is at the mouth of the Big River, south of the town; it is a wide sandy beach that often has a lagoon where the river meets the Pacific Ocean. It can be reached via footpaths from the east end of Mendocino (on Main Street behind the Presbyterian Church) or from a parking lot on the inland side of State Route 1 that also serves the Big River Unit.

Portuguese Beach is a smaller cove, under the headlands at the west end of Main Street. From the end of the street, a footpath along the headlands leads to a staircase to the beach.

Below the headlands to the north, there are many small coves that are accessible only by boat.

== Big River Unit ==
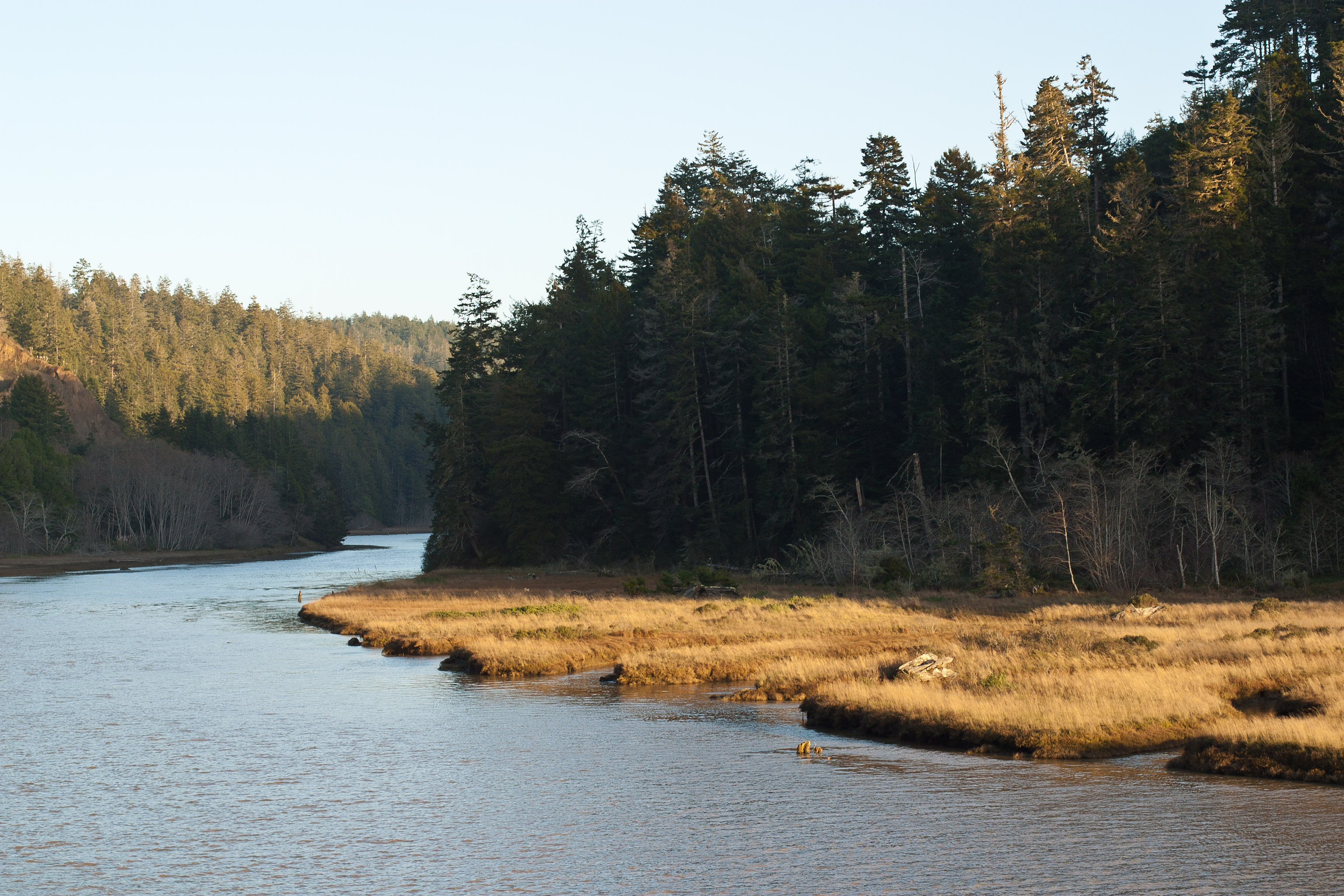
The Big River Unit of Mendocino Headlands State Park, from the path on the north bank of the river.

The Big River Unit of Mendocino Headlands State park consists of 7,334 acres (30 km^{2}) of land along the banks of the Big River, south of Mendocino. It includes 1,500 acres (6.1 km^{2}) of wetlands and the longest undeveloped estuary in Northern California. The park was created on July 30, 2002, after a group of donors, nonprofit organizations, and agencies, led by the Mendocino Land Trust, collected over 25 million dollars to purchase the property from the Hawthorne Timber Company and conveyed it to the California State Park system. The park includes remnants of the historic Mendocino Lumber Company sawmill.

The unit can be reached by State Route 1, south of Mendocino. Amenities are few, but include hiking paths on both sides of the river. Canoes and kayaks can be used to paddle through eight miles (13 km) of forest.

At the mouth of the river, a footpath leads north under the Highway 1 bridge to Big River beach and the town of Mendocino. Inland, north of the river, the unit abuts Mendocino Woodlands State Park; the hiking path on the north bank of the river leads from one park to the other. On the south side of the river Van Damme State Park.
