= Mendicino (surname) =

Mendicino is an Italian surname. Notable people with the surname include:

- Ettore Mendicino (born 1990), Italian footballer
- Gerry Mendicino (born 1950), Canadian actor
- Marco Mendicino (born 1973), Canadian politician
