= Point Cabrillo Light =

Lighthouse in northern California

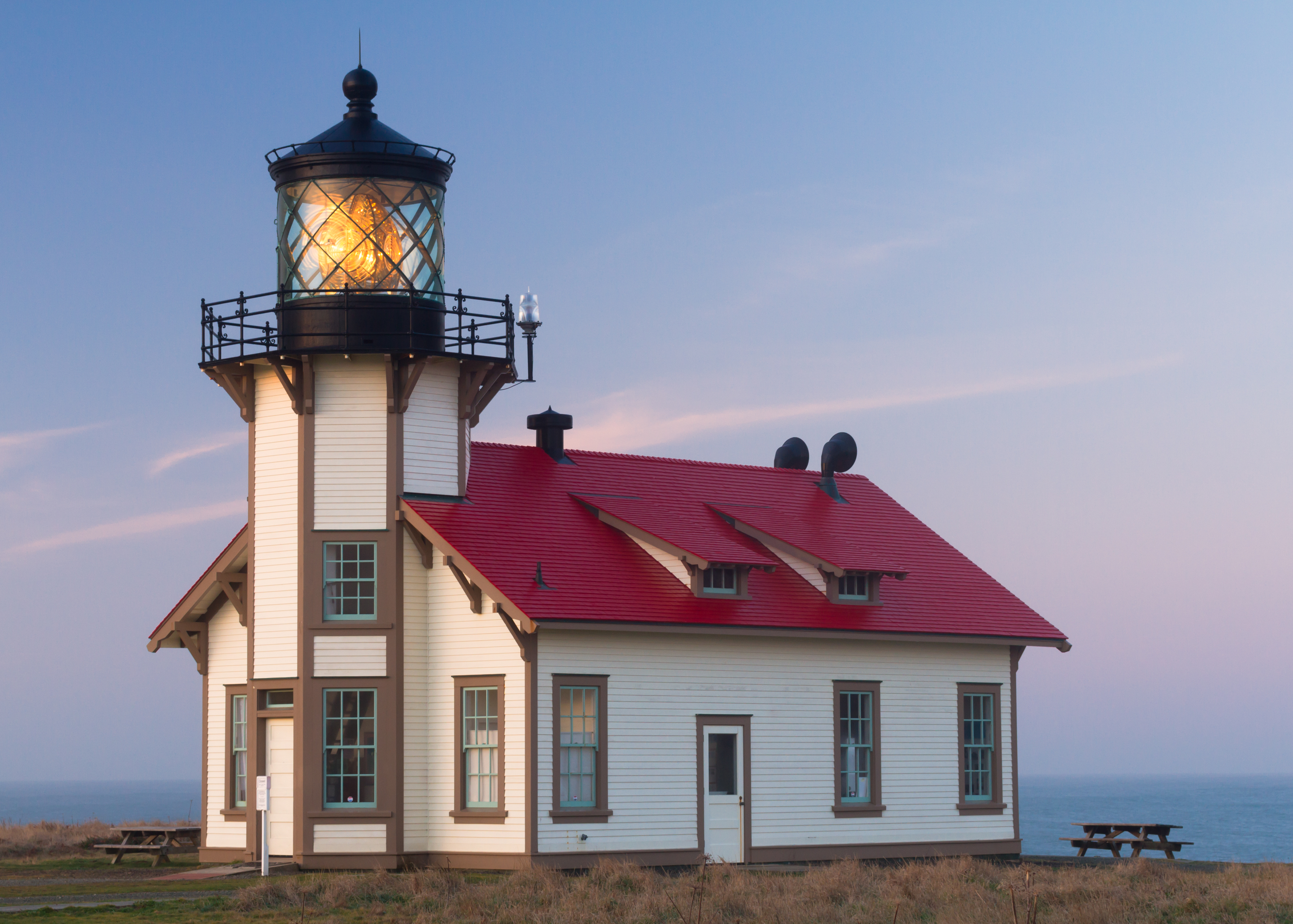
- Point Cabrillo Lighthouse
- Location: Caspar; California; United States
- Coordinates: 39°20′54.97″N 123°49′34.02″W

Tower
- Constructed: 1909
- Foundation: concrete base
- Construction: wooden tower
- Automated: 1973
- Height: 47 feet (14 m)
- Shape: octagonal tower with balcony and lantern on fog signal building
- Markings: white tower, black lantern
- Operator: Point Cabrillo Lightkeepers Association
- Heritage: National Register of Historic Places listed place

Light
- Focal height: 81 feet (25 m)
- Lens: Third-order Fresnel lens
- Range: 22 nautical miles (41 km; 25 mi)
- Characteristic: Fl W 10s.
- Point Cabrillo Light Station
- U.S. National Register of Historic Places
- Area: 30.4 acres (12.3 ha)
- Architectural style: Bungalow/American craftsman, Lighthouse
- MPS: Light Stations of California MPS
- NRHP reference No.: 91001092
- Added to NRHP: September 3, 1991

Point Cabrillo Light is a lighthouse in northern California, United States, between Point Arena and Cape Mendocino, just south of the community of Caspar. It has been a federal aid to navigation since 1909. It is part of the California state park system as Point Cabrillo Light Station State Historic Park.

It should not be confused with the inactive Old Point Loma Lighthouse or the active New Point Loma Lighthouse in San Diego, both of which lie within the grounds of Cabrillo National Monument and are sometimes referred to as the Cabrillo lighthouse.

== Description ==
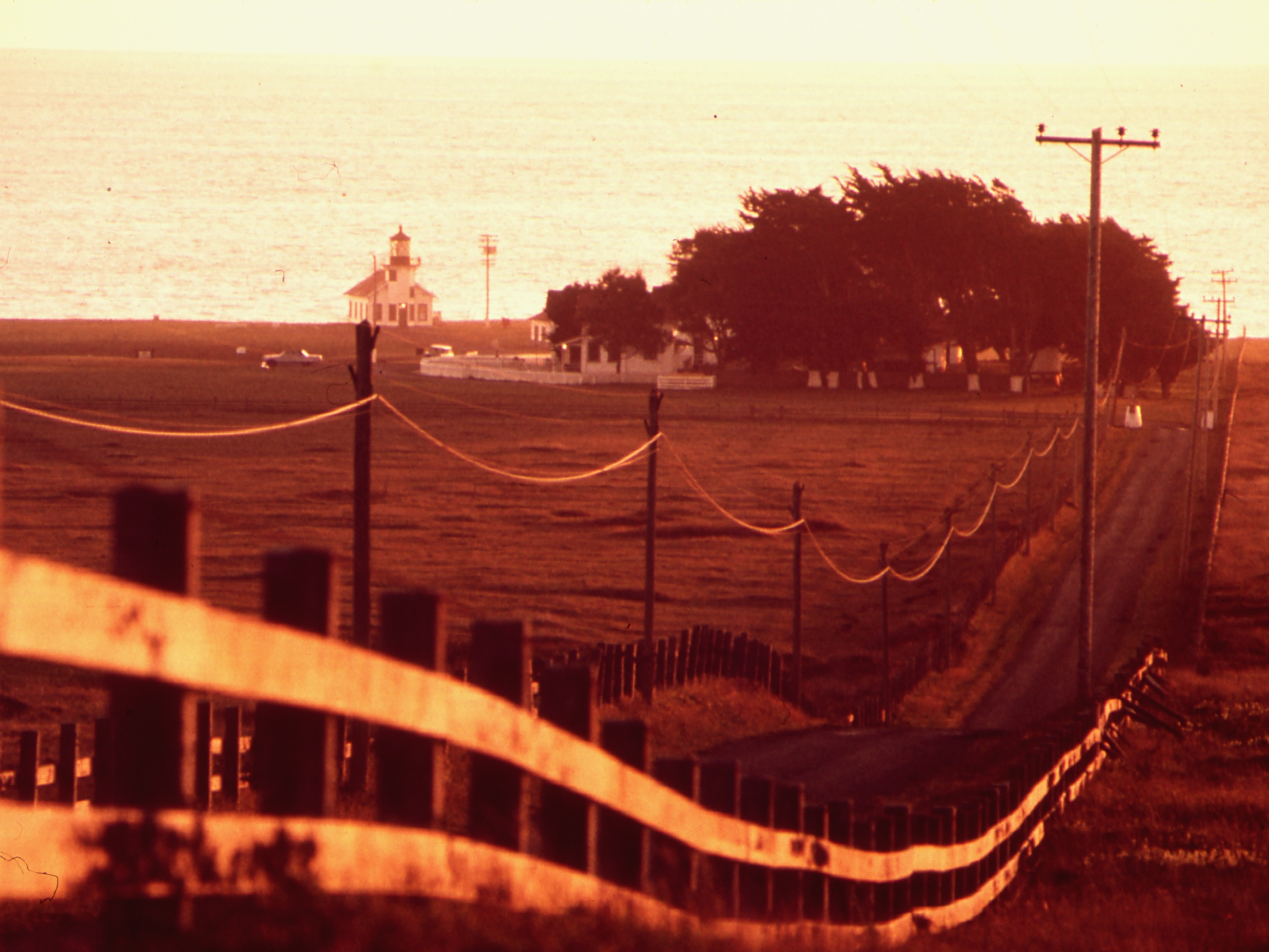
Point Cabrillo Light in May 1972, likely taken from Lighthouse Road within Point Cabrillo Light Station State Historic Park

The Point Cabrillo Lighthouse complex is located about 1.5 miles (2.4 km) north of Mendocino, California, and includes the lighthouse itself together with several outbuildings. Most of the original structures remain, but the barn is missing: in 1986 it was destroyed in a fire department exercise. The remaining lighthouse station is "one of the most complete light stations in the United States".

Atop the lighthouse spins a third-order Fresnel lens with four panels containing 90 lead glass prisms and weighing 6800 pounds, constructed by Chance Brothers, an English company, and shipped to Point Cabrillo around Cape Horn. The light is only 32 feet (9.8 m) above the ground, but because of the height of the headlands it stands 81 feet (25 m) above sea level. It was originally lit by a kerosene lamp and turned by a clockwork mechanism which was replaced by an electric light and motor in 1935. The present light uses a single 1000-watt electric filament. Depending on atmospheric conditions, the Fresnel lens creates a focused beam which can be seen to the horizon and beyond. The beam rotates once every 40 seconds, producing a flash every 10 seconds.

== History ==
Point Cabrillo, the sandstone headland on which the Point Cabrillo Light lies, was named in 1870 by the United States Geological Survey after the Portuguese explorer João Rodrigues Cabrilho, although Cabrillo's voyage of exploration on behalf of Spain along the California coast did not reach as far north as the point. Because Spain controlled early California, the Spanish derivation of his name is the one used today. The opium-trading brig Frolic wrecked on a reef north of Point Cabrillo in 1850; the investigation of the wreck by agents of Henry Meiggs led to the discovery of the coast redwood forests of the Mendocino area and the beginning of the timber trade that would drive the local economy for decades.

In 1873, Point Cabrillo was surveyed as a potential site for a lighthouse; however, no lighthouse was built at that time. By 1904, several shipwrecks later, the U.S. Lighthouse Service recommended that a lighthouse be placed at the point. The bill to fund its construction, Senate Bill 6648, passed in June 1906, and the government bought 30 acres of land on Point Cabrillo from rancher David Gordon for $3,195. The lighthouse was constructed by the Lindgren Company beginning in 1908, and began operation in 1909. Its first light keeper was Wilhelm Baumgartner, who held the position until 1923. In 1935, an air diaphone supertyfone sound signal (a foghorn) was installed.

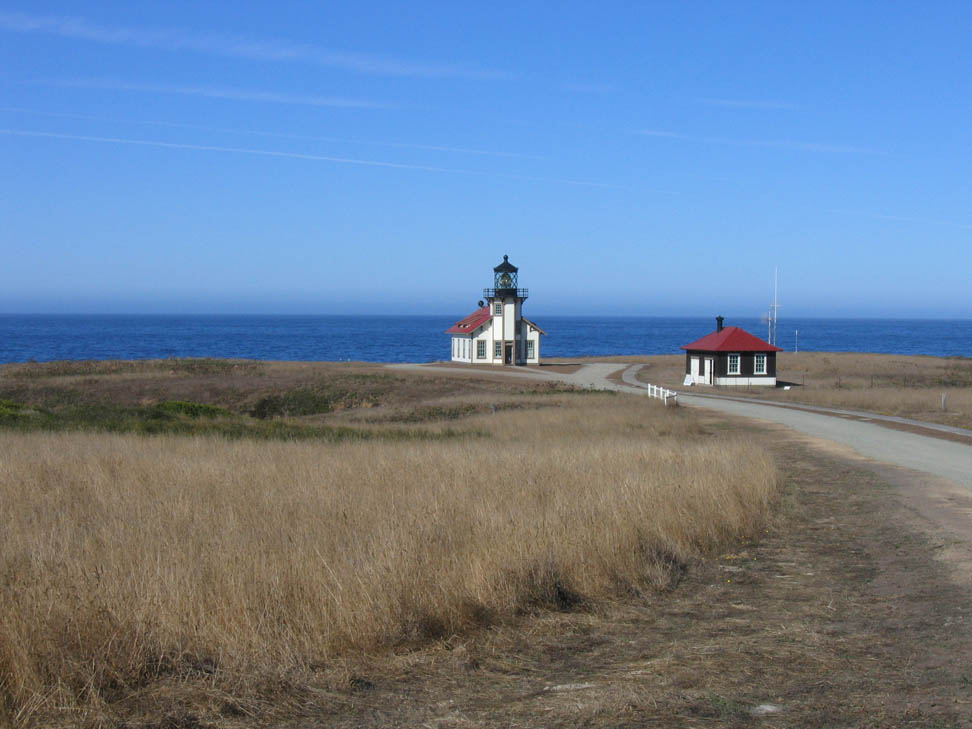
A distant view of the lighthouse

The United States Coast Guard took over the Lighthouse Service in 1939. The lighthouse building sustained major damage in 1960 after a storm caused waves that crested above the light and flooded the building with mud, but the lens remained undamaged. Later during the Cold War, the station was used to simulate a Soviet radar base in training exercises. The Coast Guard manned the station until 1973, when the lens was covered and a modern rotating beacon was mounted on a metal stand on the roof west of the lantern room.

In 1988 the California Coastal Conservancy began buying the land surrounding the light station, and in 1991 the station was added to the National Register of Historic Places. However, the California State Park System declined to take over the land at that time because of state budget shortfalls; instead, the station was managed for nine years by a non-profit organization, the North Coast Interpretive Association. Beginning in 1996, the NCIA organized a major restoration of the station to the state it would have been in the 1930s, after it was electrified, including a return to active duty of the main lens of the light. In 1999, the original third-order Fresnel lens was reinstalled after being upgraded to meet more modern standards. Before it could be used the light had to be as reliable as a Directional Code Beacon, which is commonly used at airports. The restored lighthouse was opened to the public in August 2001, and appeared in the Warner Bros. 2001 drama film The Majestic. In 2002, California State Parks purchased the light station for four million dollars. The NCIA then became the Point Cabrillo Light Keeper Association, which continues to run the station for the state park system. The light itself is recognized by the U.S. Coast Guard as an official Aid to Navigation, on current USCG navigation charts, and is operationally maintained by the USCG Auxiliary. The station won the Governor's Historic Preservation Award in 2007, and the Preservation Design Award of the California Preservation Foundation in the same year.

A hiking trail, part of the California Coastal Trail, was established in 2011 and connects the light station to Caspar Headlands State Beach one mile to the north, passing Frolic Cove along the way.

== See also ==
- List of lighthouses in the United States
- List of Museums in the North Coast (California)
