= Miasa, Nagano =

Dissolved municipality in Nagano prefecture, Japan

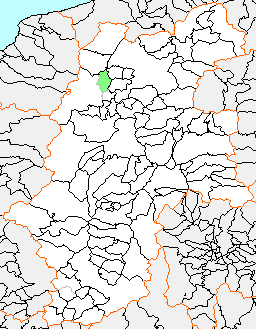
Map of Miasa, Nagano

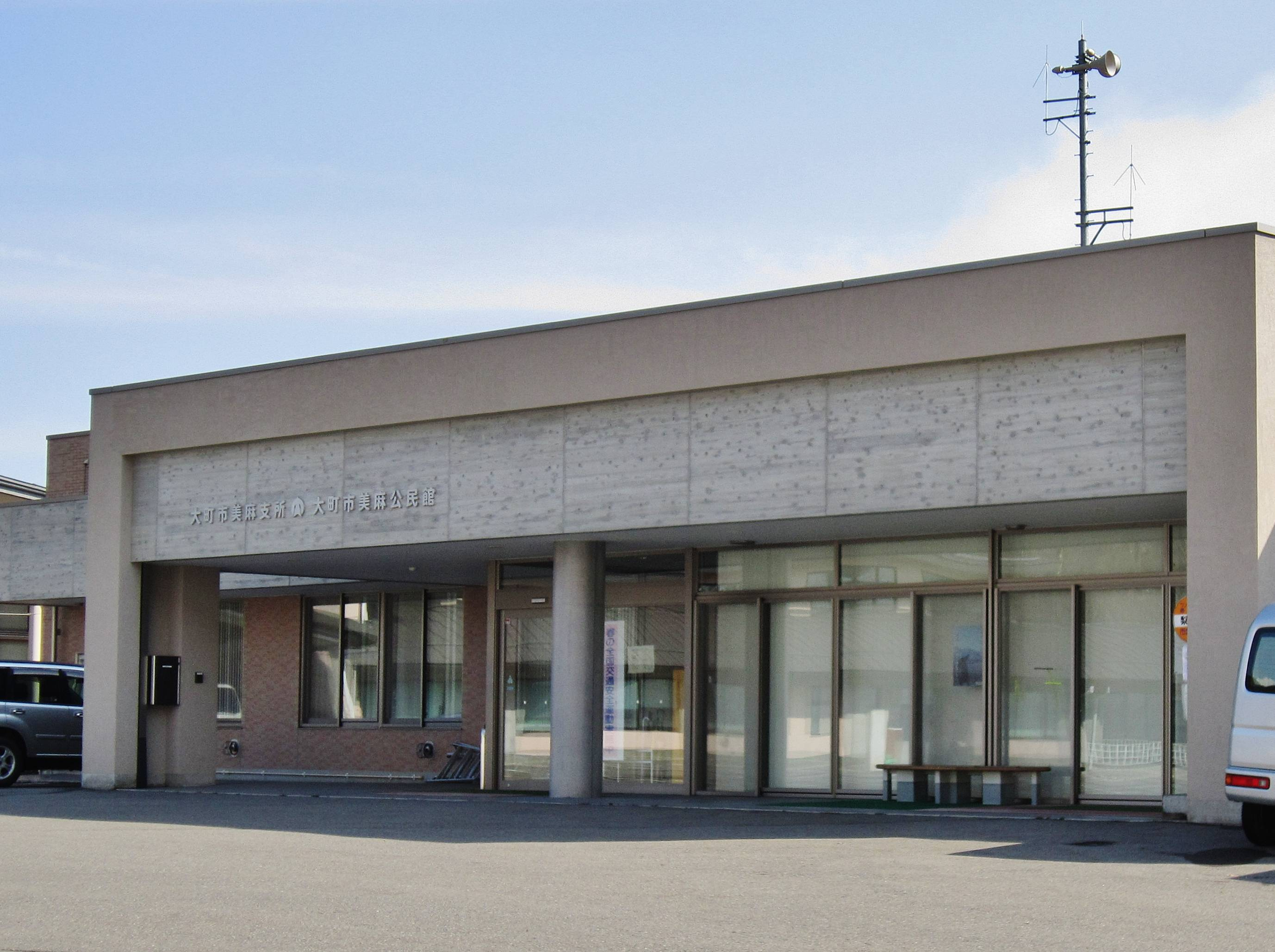
former Miasa Town Hall

Miasa (美麻村, Miasa-mura; lit. "beautiful hemp village") was a village located in Kitaazumi District, Nagano Prefecture, Japan.

As of 2003, the village had an estimated population of 1,255 and a density of 18.95 persons per km^{2}. The total area was 66.21 km^{2}.

On January 1, 2006, Miasa, along with the village of Yasaka (also from Kitaazumi District), was merged into the expanded city of Ōmachi.

Miasa has a long tradition of producing hemp, which has been grown there since the Yayoi period, 2000 years ago.

It is part of a Sister City exchange program with Mendocino, California. Each year, the Junior High from one country sends students to the school at the other for a two-week visit, enriching understanding of the different cultures.
