= Mendocino Music Festival =

The Mendocino Music Festival is an eclectic concert series held each July since 1986 on the Pacific bluffs in the small coastal Northern California town of Mendocino. Evening concerts feature a full symphony orchestra, a big band, an opera, guest singers and bands, chamber music ensembles, dance, blues, jazz, world, folk, and popular contemporary music. Daytime performances include a piano series, chamber concerts, an array of jazz and other contemporary ensembles and an emerging artists scholarship recital.

A festival orchestra composed of professional musicians from the San Francisco Symphony, San Francisco Opera orchestra, San Francisco Ballet orchestra, Symphony of the Redwoods and other Bay Area orchestras is assembled annually for the event. Orchestra members are hosted by local residents.

Each year the Mendocino Music Festival erects a 16,000-square-foot (1,500 m^{2}) tent containing a concert hall at a site overlooking the Pacific Ocean at the Mendocino Headlands State Park. Seating more than 840, the tent is adjacent to the Ford House Museum Visitor Center and across Main Street from the Kelley House Museum. The festival office is in the Old Bank Building on the corner of Main and Kasten Streets. A volunteer network of over 200 people help during the festival season and at year-round events.

Established in 1986, the festival was the dream of Allan Pollack, Susan Waterfall and former principal bassoonist of the San Francisco Symphony Walter Green.
