= Mendocino Unified School District =

School district in California, United States

Address
- 44141 Little Lake Road Mendocino, Mendocino County, California, 95460; United States
- Coordinates: 39.3114°N 123.7842°W

District information
- Type: Unified
- Grades: K – 12^{th}
- Superintendent: Jason J. Morse
- Business administrator: Jason Fruth
- Governing agency: Mendocino County Office of Education
- NCES District ID: 0624480
- District ID: CA-23-65581

Students and staff
- Students: 536

Other information
- Website: www.mendocinousd.org
- Location of district office (red map pin) within Mendocino County (shown in green)

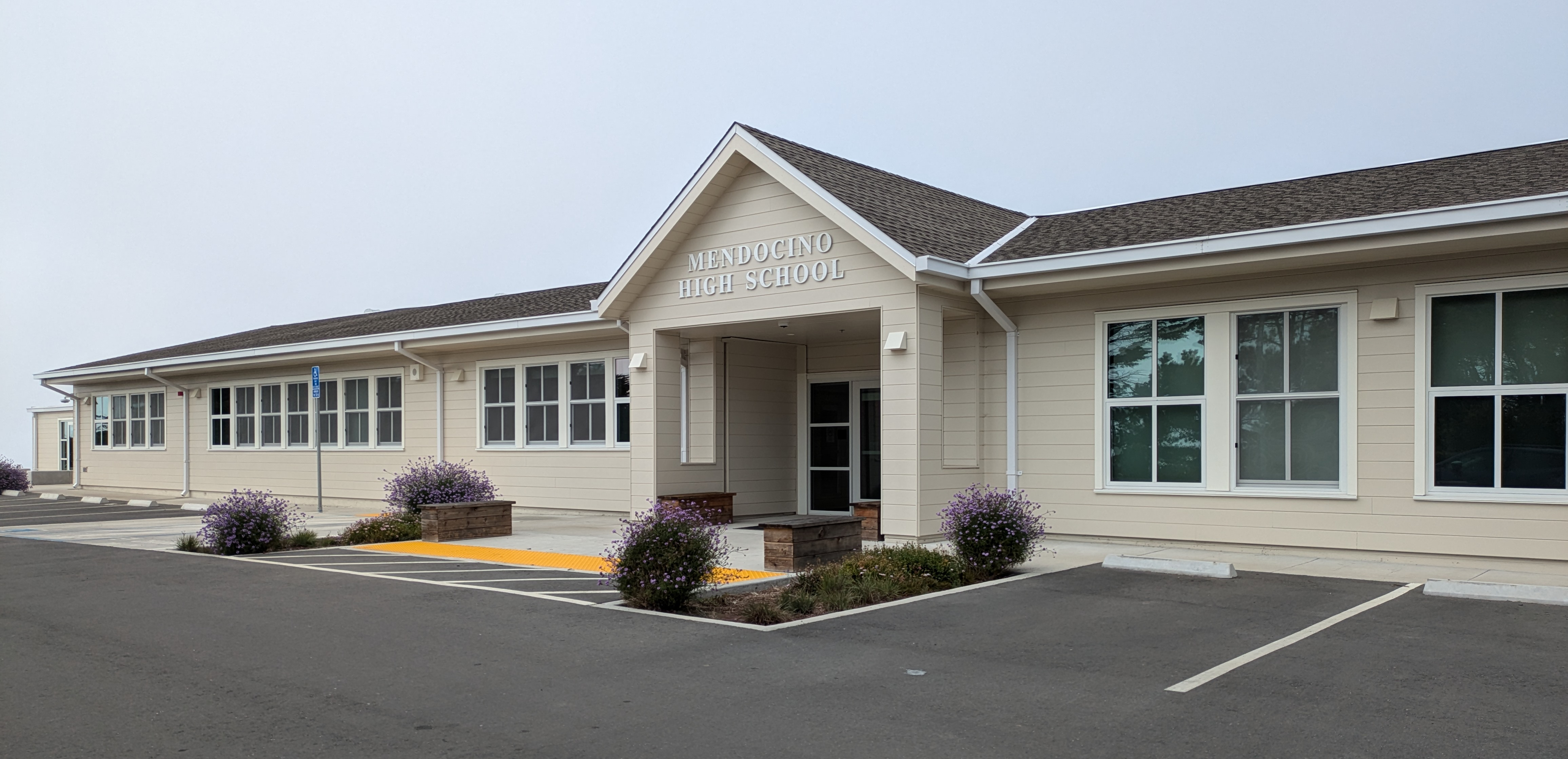
Mendocino High School

Mendocino Unified School District is a public school district in Mendocino County, California, United States.

In addition to Mendocino, the district includes Albion, Caspar, Comptche, and Little River.

== Schools ==
=== Secondary schools ===
==== High schools ====
- Mendocino High
- Mendocino Alternative
- Mendocino Community High
- Mendocino Sunrise High

=== K–8 schools ===
- Mendocino K-8

=== K–3 schools ===
- Albion Elementary
- Comptche Elementary

=== Pre-K ===
- Greenwood Preschool
