= Mendocino Lumber Company =

Overview
- Headquarters: Mendocino, California
- Locale: Mendocino County, California
- Dates of operation: 1883–1931

Technical
- Track gauge: 4 ft 8 1/2 in (1,435 mm) standard gauge
- Length: 9 miles (14 km)

Mendocino Lumber Company operated a sawmill on Big River near the town of Mendocino, California. The sawmill began operation in 1853 as the Redwood Lumber Manufacturing Company, and changed ownership several times before cutting its final logs in 1938. The sawmill site became part of the Big River Unit of Mendocino Headlands State Park where a few features of the mill and its associated forest railway are still visible along the longest undeveloped estuary in northern California.

== History ==
California Gold Rush entrepreneur Henry Meiggs owned one of California's first sawmills near Bodega. After that sawmill had converted nearby forests to lumber for the booming city of San Francisco, Meiggs investigated reports of coastal forests to the north and shipped a boiler and steam-powered gang sawmill around Cape Horn to be erected on the navigable Big River estuary. After ordering the machinery from eastern manufacturers, E.C. Williams took a shortcut across the isthmus of Panama in the spring of 1852 to survey the Big River in advance of machinery delivery aboard the brig Ontario. The sawmill was completed in the spring of 1853, and produced 50,000 board foot of lumber per day. It was comparatively easy to float logs to the sawmill from trees cut along the shoreline of the estuary, and ships carried the lumber to San Francisco.

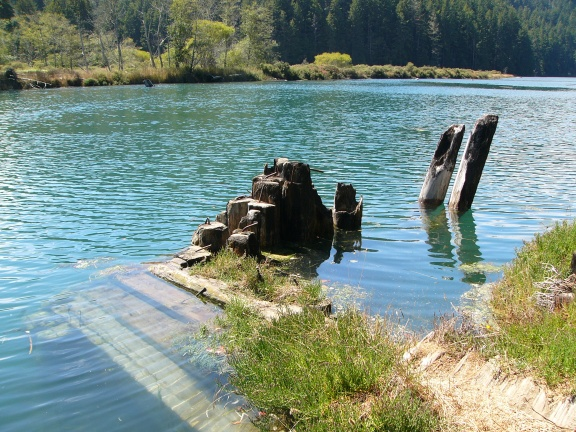
Remains of bank protection at the log dump pool where logs were rolled off railroad flatcars into Big River.

Log storage was about 1 kilometre (0.62 miles) upstream of the sawmill to prevent Pacific surf from breaking containment booms and allowing the river to carry the log inventory out to sea. When the original gang sawmill proved too small for the old-growth Sequoia sempervirens logs, a larger sawmill was built near the boom, but lumber drying and storage for shipment continued on the bluff adjacent to the river mouth. An even larger sawmill was built on the flat near the boom after a fire in 1861. Moving logs to the sawmill became more difficult after the closest trees had been cut. Logs were moved to a natural river pool about 5 miles (8.0 km) upstream of the sawmill, but only during winter storms was river flow adequate to move those logs downstream to the mill. Several dozen dams were built on Big River tributaries upstream of the pool to impound water for sudden release to float log downstream during other seasons. By 1873, the name had changed to Mendocino Lumber Company and the mill was the most important in Mendocino County.

By 1883 the difficulties of using horses and oxen for moving logs to the river pool encouraged building railroads to reduce the friction of skidding logs. Railway branches were built to reach trees and then dismantled after those logs had been moved to Big River. Total length of track was never more than 25 miles (40 km). Teams of working animals pulled the logs on flatcars until 1901. The railroad was rebuilt after extensive flood damage in 1904. Union Lumber Company purchased the Mendocino Lumber Company sawmill, railroad, and timberlands in 1906; and again rebuilt the railroad after flood damage in 1907. The buildings of Boyle's logging camp were moved on railway cars when the camp was moved upstream from the Big River confluence with Laguna Creek to the Little North Fork Big River in 1912. The Laguna Creek branch line trestle across Big River was replaced by a Howe truss bridge in the winter of 1919-1920. The sawmill operated until 1931 when Union Lumber Company's Fort Bragg sawmill was able to meet lumber demands decreased by the Great Depression. The railroad was dismantled during 1936 and 1937 when Japanese preparations for World War II raised the value of scrap iron. The sawmill was briefly reopened in 1938 to mill Douglas fir logs salvaged when a log raft from Oregon broke up off the coast of Mendocino.

== Dinky ==
Locomotive number 1 arrived in July 1901 to improve overland transport of logs from the remaining forests to the pool five miles upstream of the sawmill. It was Baldwin Locomotive Works 0-4-2 tank locomotive #5353 built in 1880 to pull unpowered street cars around Golden Gate Park. This steam dummy weighed 20 tons with a full-length cab covering the boiler to resemble the street cars it pulled. After replacing the teams on 18 August 1900, the cab length was gradually reduced repairing damage from various woods mishaps over the years until it resembled conventional locomotives. As more capable locomotives arrived to share the load, the first locomotive came to be known as the Dinky. Dinky disappeared when the fourth locomotive arrived about 1923, but its disposal is undocumented.

== Excelsior ==
In the spring of 1902 the company received a new Climax locomotive numbered 2 for logging branches with grades as steep as 12 percent. Excelsior brought logs from the steep branches to the comparatively level main line downstream of Boyle's logging camp, where the Dinky would move them to the log dump five miles upstream of the sawmill. The locomotives were periodically loaded onto a barge at the log dump for transfer downstream to the sawmill for overhaul. On one of these trips Excelsior slipped off the barge into the Big River estuary in March 1921. Grammar school students Alden and Art Rice, considered the best local swimmers, were paid $50 each to brave the cold, 20-foot (6.1 m)-deep water stringing steel recovery cables under the submerged locomotive. The engineer paid each boy an additional $25 to recover his tools which had spilled from the locomotive toolbox. Excelsior was sold to a railfan and left in a shed on the Railroad Gulch branch when the rails were removed. Before the railfan could move the locomotive, it was illegally scrapped by unemployed workmen trying to keep food on their table.

== Molly ==
In 1910 Union Lumber Company moved locomotive number 3 with about 70 tons of rail from a dismantled Navarro River logging operation about 10 miles (16 km) south of Big River. Molly was a 2-4-4 saddle-tank locomotive built by Ricks & Firth. The saddle tank was replaced by square tanks on each running board some time after 1915. When the sawmill ceased operation, Molly was abandoned where the railroad dumped logs into the pool five miles upstream of the sawmill. There she rusted away through World War II until Union Lumber Company bulldozers built a road for the scrapping crew.

== Fourth locomotive ==
In 1923 Union Lumber Company transferred a locomotive from the California Western Railroad to replace the aged Dinky. This locomotive had been built by Baldwin Locomotive Works as a 2-4-2 tank locomotive in 1884, and became California Western Railroad number 3 in 1895. It had been rebuilt as a 2-4-4 tank locomotive at Fort Bragg, officially retired from California Western service before 1917, and recorded as sold to Mendocino Lumber Company in 1918; but was not delivered until five years later. No documentation has been found indicating this fourth locomotive was named or numbered in service on Big River. This locomotive was rebuilt after being wrecked in a September 1924 runaway derailment when brakes failed on a downhill grade. This locomotive was bringing a woods crew back to the Boyle logging camp in November 1929 when they discovered a burning trestle. The loggers declined engineer Walter Hanson's offer to take them across the burning trestle in time for supper, and watched as Hanson's locomotive fell through the burning trestle attempting the trip alone. The locomotive remained where it fell when the line beyond the trestle was dismantled for scrap, and is presumed to have been scrapped later with Molly.
