= Mendocino, California =

- Unincorporated community Census-designated place
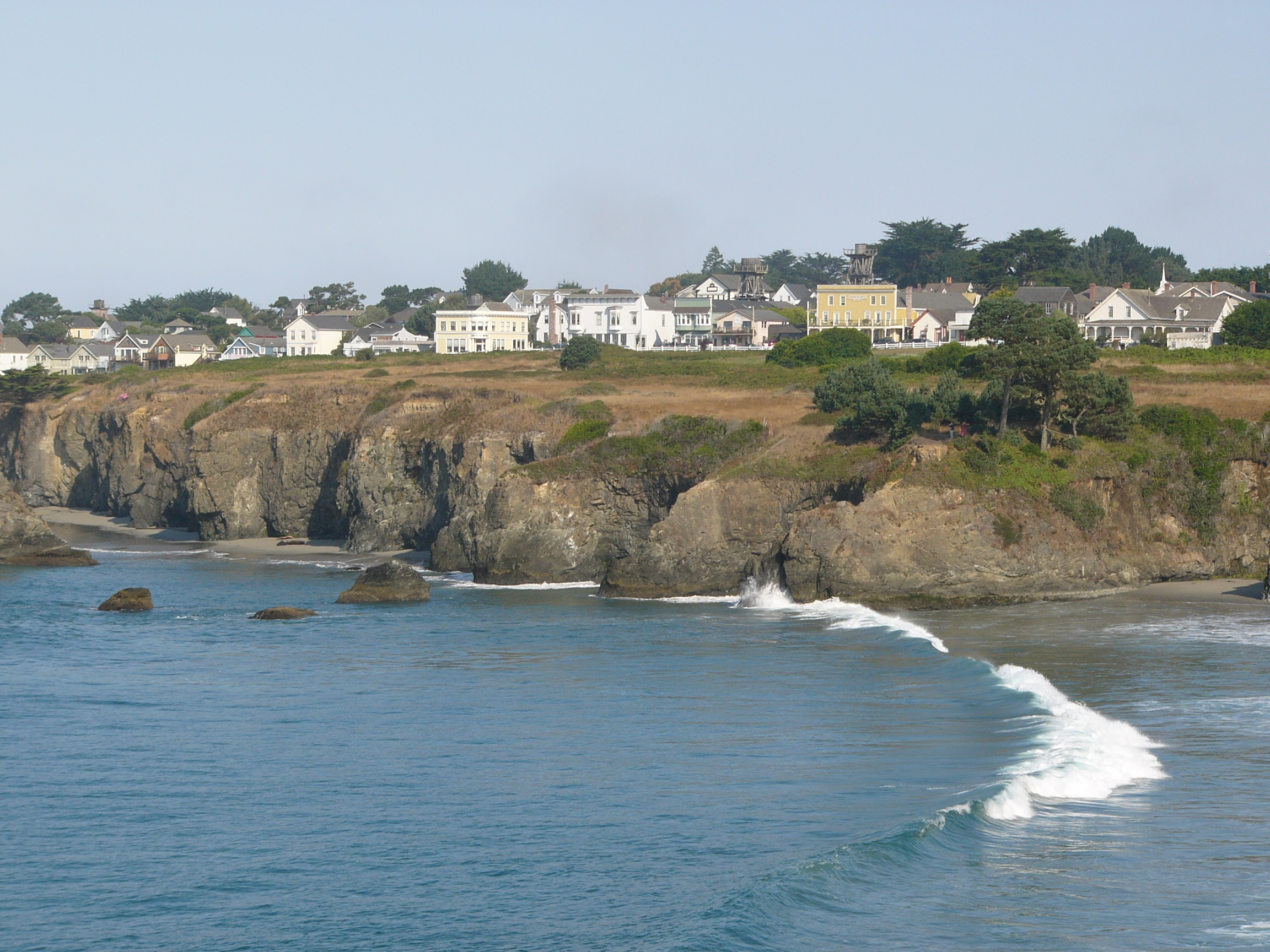
- Mendocino, California

- Location in Mendocino County and the state of California

- Location in the United States
- Coordinates: 39°18′28″N 123°47′58″W
- Country: United States
- State: California
- County: Mendocino

Area
  - Total: 3.032 sq mi (7.85 km^{2})
  - Land: 2.257 sq mi (5.85 km^{2})
  - Water: 0.775 sq mi (2.01 km^{2}) 25.56%
- Elevation: 154 ft (47 m)

Population (2020)
  - Total: 932
  - Density: 412.9/sq mi (159.4/km^{2})
- Time zone: UTC-8 (Pacific (PST))
  - Summer (DST): UTC-7 (PDT)
- ZIP code: 95460
- Area code: 707
- FIPS code: 06-46814
- GNIS feature ID: 1659106

Mendocino (Spanish for "of Mendoza") is an unincorporated community in Mendocino County, California, United States. The name comes from Cape Mendocino, located 85 miles (137 km) to the north and named by early Spanish navigators in honor of Antonio de Mendoza, Viceroy of New Spain. Despite its small size, the town's scenic location on a headland surrounded by the Pacific Ocean has made it extremely popular as an artists' colony and with vacationers.

Mendocino is located 10 miles (16 km) south of Fort Bragg at an elevation of 154 feet (47 m). For statistical purposes, the United States Census Bureau has defined Mendocino as a census-designated place (CDP). The population of the CDP was 932 at the 2020 census.

== History ==
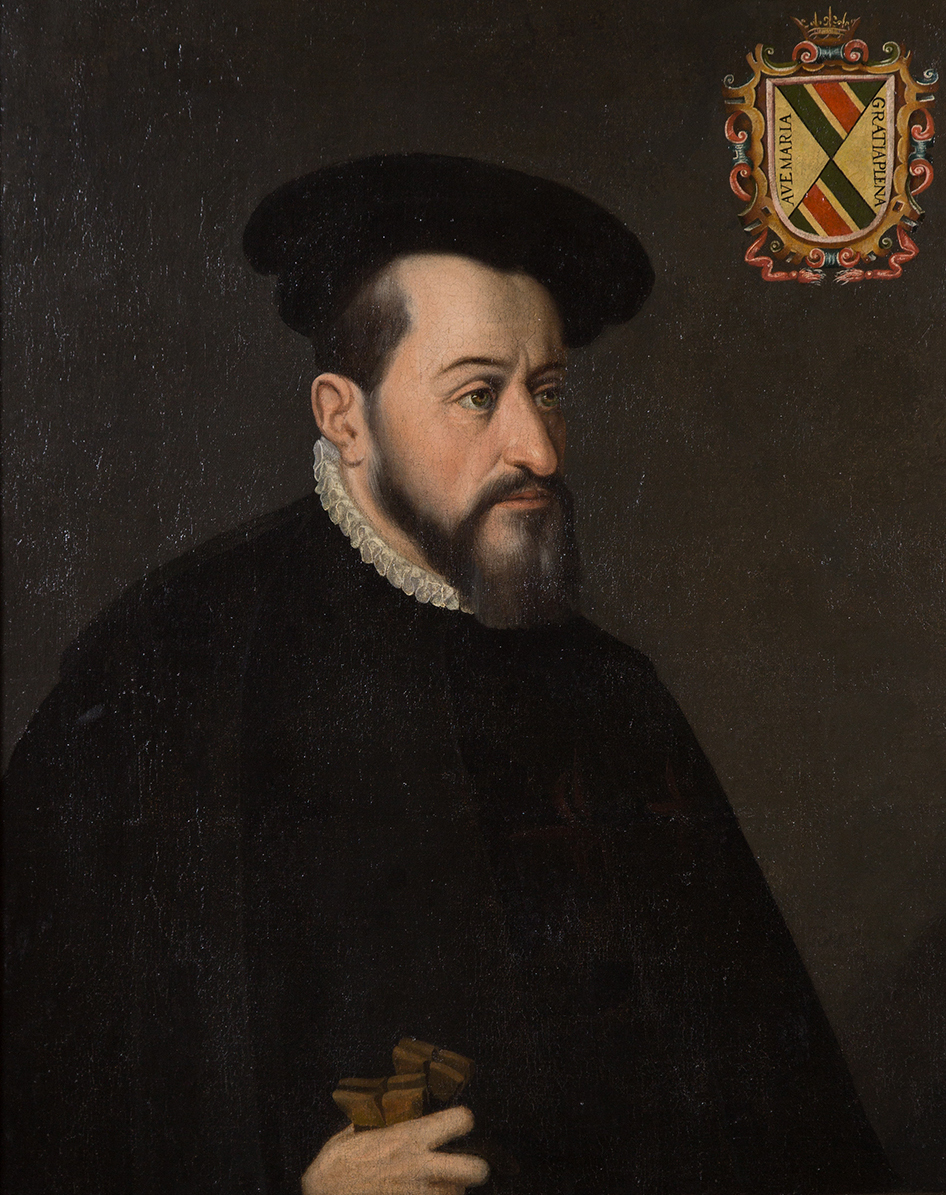
Antonio de Mendoza, the namesake of Mendocino

Prior to 1850, a Pomo settlement named Buldam was located near Mendocino on the north bank of the Big River. In 1850, the ship Frolic was wrecked a few miles north of Mendocino, at Point Cabrillo, and the investigation of the wreck by agents of Henry Meiggs sparked the development of the timber industry in the area. Mendocino itself was founded in 1852 as a logging community for what became the Mendocino Lumber Company, and was originally named "Meiggsville" after Meiggs. The town was also known as "Big River" Meiggstown, and "Mendocino City", before the current name was settled on. The first post office opened in 1858. Many of the town's early settlers were New Englanders, as was true of many older Northern California logging towns. Portuguese fishermen from the Azores also settled in the area, as did immigrants from Canton Province in China, who built the Taoist Temple of Kwan Tai in town.

Between 1940 and 1950, Mendocino's population grew by 3%. In 2021, there was a water shortage which forced businesses to transport their own drinking water.

== Geography ==
California State Route 1 (Shoreline Highway) runs along the eastern edge of the downtown area; it leads north 10 miles (16 km) to Fort Bragg and south 29 miles (47 km) to Manchester. Comptche-Ukiah Road departs east from Route 1 just south of the town, leading across the California Coast Ranges 14 miles (23 km) to Comptche, and 44 miles (71 km) to Ukiah, the Mendocino county seat. The Big River forms the southern edge of the community and joins the Pacific Ocean at Big River Beach within Mendocino Headlands State Park, a quarter mile south of the center of town.

The Census Bureau definition of the area may not precisely correspond to the local understanding of the community. According to the United States Census Bureau, the Mendocino CDP has a total area of 3.0 square miles (7.8 km^{2}), of which 2.3 square miles (6.0 km^{2}) are land and 0.8 square miles (2.1 km^{2}), or 25.56%, are water.

In 2021, some aquifers feeding the settlement's demand for water failed. Wells in the area are typically dug to a depth of 8 to 30 feet (2.4 to 9.1 m). One well was dug to a depth of 165 feet (50 m) without successfully tapping into an aquifer. Water is now brought in by tankers, and local businesses have fitted chemical toilets to conserve water.

=== Climate ===
Summers are characterized by frequent fog and highs mostly in the upper sixties and lows in the fifties. Winters rarely, if ever, see frost or snow, due to close proximity to the Pacific Ocean. Mendocino averages about 43 inches (1,100 mm) of rain per year, concentrated mainly in fall, winter, spring, and early summer.

This region experiences warm (but not hot) and dry summers, with no average monthly temperatures above 71.6 °F (22 °C). According to the Köppen Climate Classification system, Mendocino has a warm-summer Mediterranean climate, abbreviated "Csb" on climate maps.

== Demographics ==
Historical population
Census	Pop.	Note	%±
2000	824		—
2010	894		8.5%
2020	932		4.3%
U.S. Decennial Census; 1860–1870 1880-1890; 1900 1910 1920; 1930 1940 1950; 1960 1970 1980; 1990 2000 2010

Mendocino first appeared as a census designated place in the 2000 U.S. census.

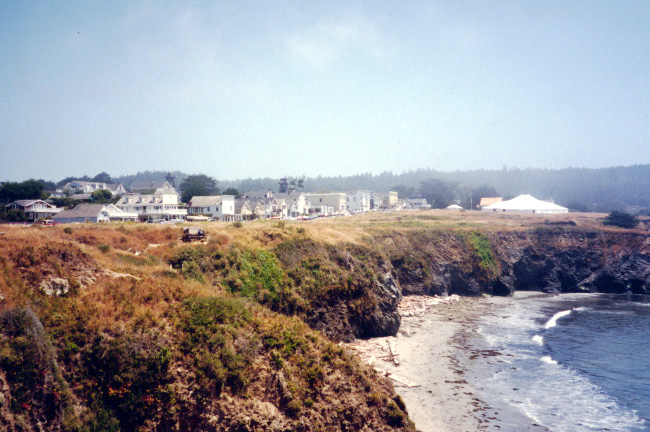
View of Mendocino from the northwest, with the Mendocino Music Festival tent to the right

=== 2020 ===
The 2020 United States census reported that Mendocino had a population of 932. The population density was 412.9 inhabitants per square mile (159.4/km^{2}). The racial makeup of Mendocino was 798 (85.6%) White, 4 (0.4%) African American, 2 (0.2%) Native American, 9 (1.0%) Asian, 0 (0.0%) Pacific Islander, 21 (2.3%) from other races, and 98 (10.5%) from two or more races. Hispanic or Latino of any race were 73 persons (7.8%).

The census reported that 96.2% of the population lived in households, 3.8% lived in non-institutionalized group quarters, and no one was institutionalized.

There were 459 households, out of which 84 (18.3%) had children under the age of 18 living in them, 177 (38.6%) were married-couple households, 59 (12.9%) were cohabiting couple households, 145 (31.6%) had a female householder with no partner present, and 78 (17.0%) had a male householder with no partner present. 150 households (32.7%) were one person, and 84 (18.3%) were one person aged 65 or older. The average household size was 1.95. There were 252 families (54.9% of all households).

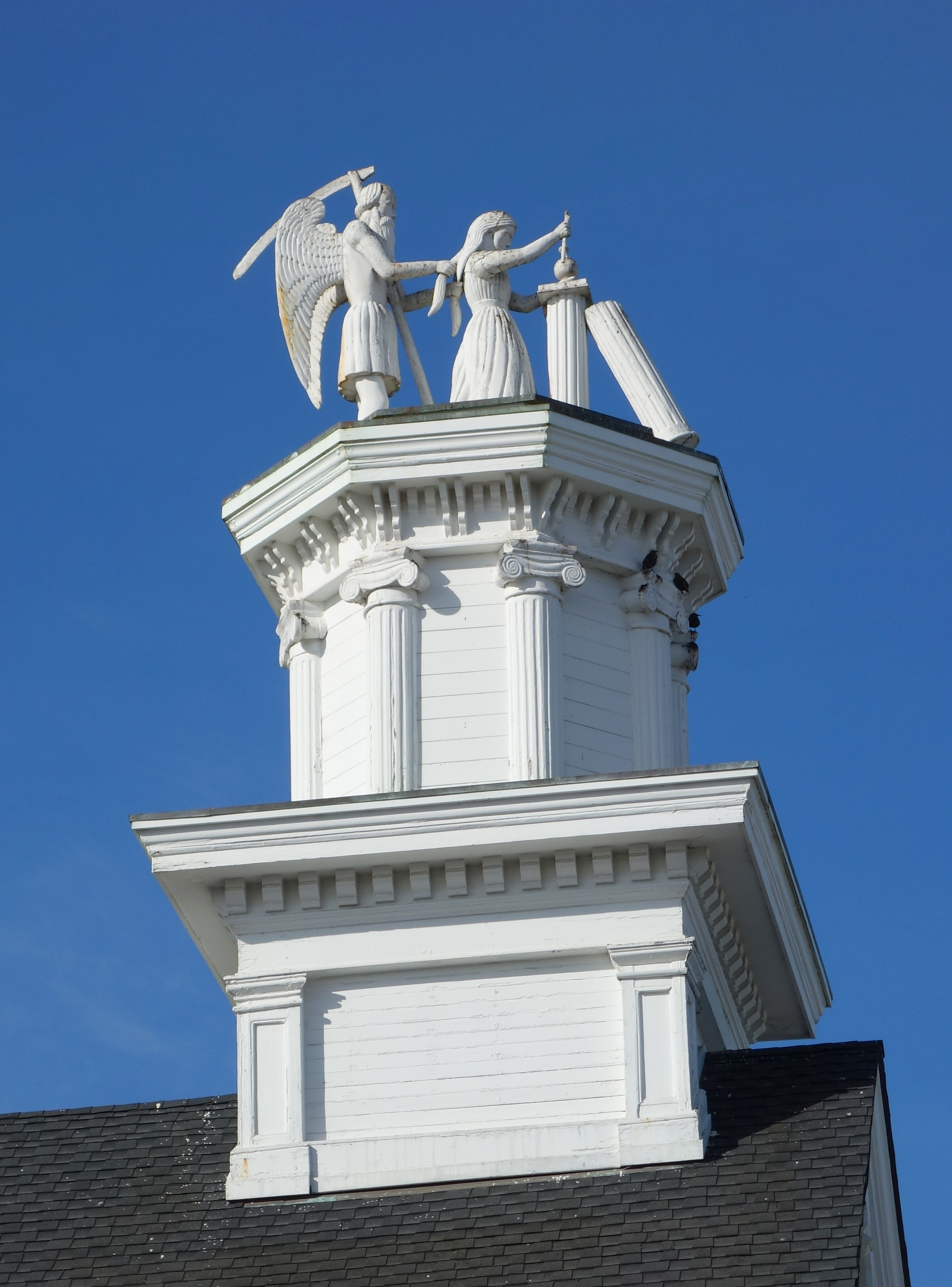
Cupola of the Masonic Hall in Mendocino

The age distribution was 113 people (12.1%) under the age of 18, 33 people (3.5%) aged 18 to 24, 147 people (15.8%) aged 25 to 44, 256 people (27.5%) aged 45 to 64, and 383 people (41.1%) who were 65 years of age or older. The median age was 61.2 years. For every 100 females, there were 86.4 males.

There were 584 housing units at an average density of 258.8 units per square mile (99.9 units/km^{2}), of which 459 (78.6%) were occupied. Of these, 281 (61.2%) were owner-occupied, and 178 (38.8%) were occupied by renters.

=== 2010 ===
At the 2010 census Mendocino had a population of 894. The population density was 120.5 inhabitants per square mile (46.5/km^{2}). The racial makeup of Mendocino was 834 (93.3%) White, 5 (0.6%) African American, 8 (0.9%) Native American, 13 (1.5%) Asian, 1 (0.1%) Pacific Islander, 6 (0.7%) from other races, and 27 (3.0%) from two or more races. Hispanic or Latino of any race were 42 people (4.7%).

The census reported that 830 people (92.8% of the population) lived in households, 64 (7.2%) lived in non-institutionalized group quarters, and no one was institutionalized.

There were 447 households, 62 (13.9%) had children under the age of 18 living in them, 177 (39.6%) were opposite-sex married couples living together, 22 (4.9%) had a female householder with no husband present, 15 (3.4%) had a male householder with no wife present. There were 29 (6.5%) unmarried opposite-sex partnerships, and 6 (1.3%) same-sex married couples or partnerships. 178 households (39.8%) were one person and 83 (18.6%) had someone living alone who was 65 or older. The average household size was 1.86. There were 214 families (47.9% of households); the average family size was 2.41.

The age distribution was 93 people (10.4%) under the age of 18, 58 people (6.5%) aged 18 to 24, 166 people (18.6%) aged 25 to 44, 333 people (37.2%) aged 45 to 64, and 244 people (27.3%) who were 65 or older. The median age was 56.1 years. For every 100 females, there were 89.8 males. For every 100 females age 18 and over, there were 83.7 males.

There were 617 housing units at an average density of 83.1 per square mile, of the occupied units 271 (60.6%) were owner-occupied and 176 (39.4%) were rented. The homeowner vacancy rate was 3.9%; the rental vacancy rate was 9.2%. 520 people (58.2% of the population) lived in owner-occupied housing units and 310 people (34.7%) lived in rental housing units.

=== 2000 ===
At the 2000 census, the median household income was $44,107 and the median family income was $59,167. Males had a median income of $41,667 versus $29,875 for females. The per capita income for the CDP was $29,348. About 6.3% of families and 13.3% of the population were below the poverty line, including 7.3% of those under age 18 and 17.8% of those age 65 or over.

== Economy ==
Mendocino is home to a large number of hotels and bed and breakfasts. It has a downtown commercial district facing the ocean, with a number of art galleries, retail shops, lodging and restaurants.

Mendocino is one of the many small California towns facing severe water scarcity. Many of the region's wells, the town's primary water source, have run dry, so water is being brought in by truck at a cost of 20 to 45 cents per gallon. There are concerns that towns and cities in the county will stop selling water to Mendocino altogether: Fort Bragg, a city 10 miles (16 km) to the north, took this step in July 2021 because of concerns about their own water shortage.

== Arts and culture ==
After the Mendocino Art Center was formed in 1959, Mendocino experienced a forty-year art renaissance, led by artist and real estate developer Bill Zacha.

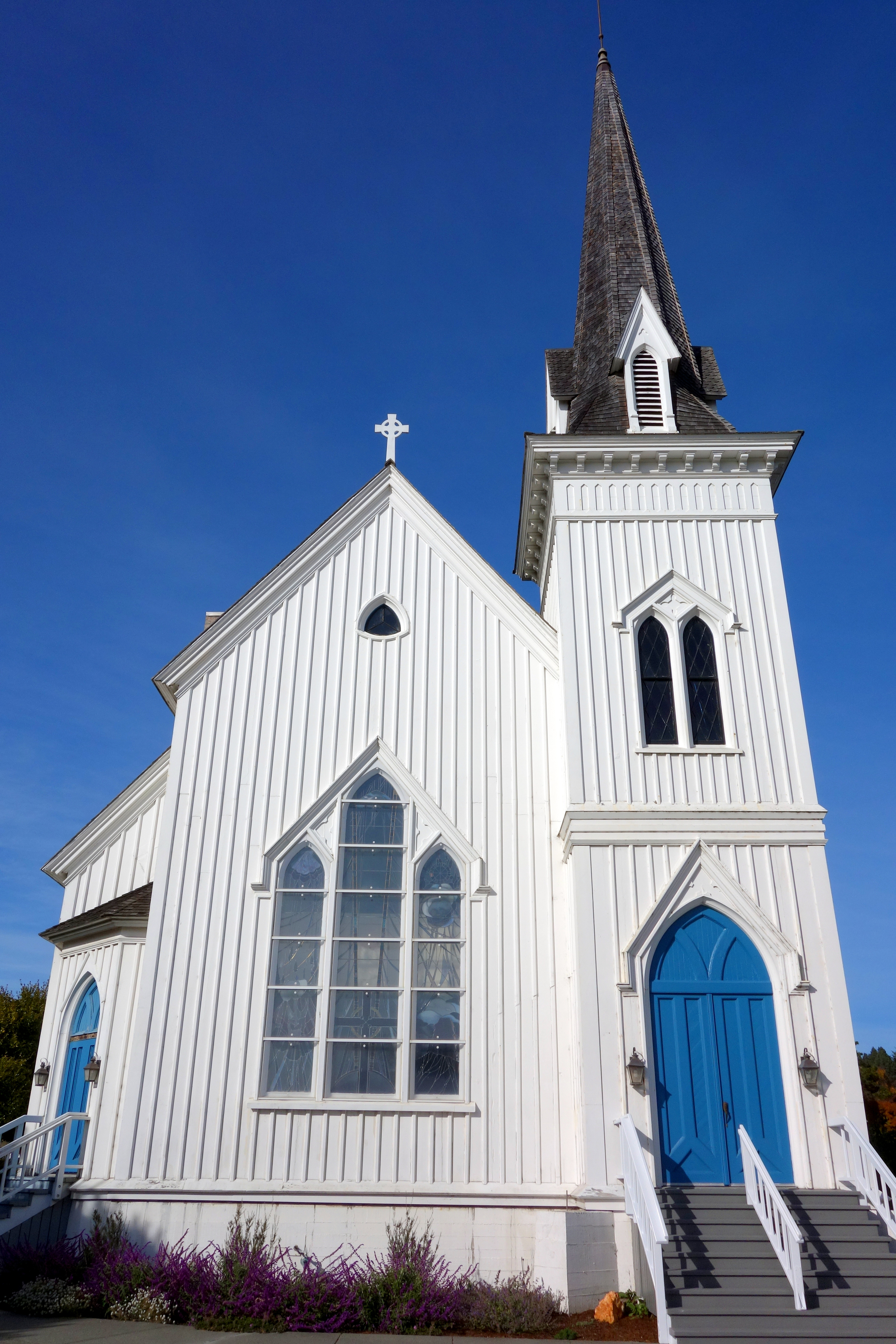
The Gothic Revival–style Mendocino Presbyterian Church in 2013

Most of the town was added to the National Register of Historic Places in 1971 as the Mendocino and Headlands Historic District. The Gothic Revival–style Mendocino Presbyterian Church on Main Street, dedicated on July 5, 1868, is one of the oldest continuously used Protestant churches in California, and is designated as California Historical Landmark #714. In addition, the Temple of Kwan Tai on Albion Street, California Historical Landmark #927, may be as old as 1854 and is one of the oldest Chinese houses of worship in California.

Since 1987, Mendocino has been the site of the Mendocino Music Festival, a classically based but musically diverse series of concerts that is held annually in a huge circus-type performance tent on the town's Main Street in the Mendocino Headlands State Park.

The Kelley House Museum has a cannon from the Frolic, currently on long-term loan at the Point Cabrillo Lighthouse complex.

The Mendocino Film Festival was first held in May 2006. As the area is a haven for artists, the festival honors them with a special "artist category", in addition to the documentary, feature and short film categories.

== Politics ==
In the state legislature, Mendocino is in the 2nd senatorial district, represented by Democrat Mike McGuire, and the 2nd Assembly district, represented by Democrat Chris Rogers.

Federally, Mendocino is in California's 2nd congressional district, represented by Democrat Jared Huffman.

== Parks and recreation ==
Friendship Park, a municipal sports playing field, was constructed by local volunteers and opened in April 1993.

=== State parks ===
- Mendocino Headlands State Park
- Mendocino Woodlands State Park
- Russian Gulch State Park
- Point Cabrillo Light Station

== Education ==
Mendocino is in the Mendocino Unified School District.

== In popular culture ==
Many films and movies have been filmed in and around Mendocino and Mendocino County, including Dying Young, The Russians Are Coming; Overboard; The Dunwich Horror; The Karate Kid Part III; Dead & Buried; Forever Young; Same Time Next Year; Racing with the Moon; Pontiac Moon; and The Majestic. Mendocino was depicted as turn-of-the-20th-century Monterey in the James Dean classic East of Eden, and it served as a New England resort town in Summer of '42 (the latter film featuring numerous local Mendocino High School students as extras).

The Sir Douglas Quintet had a number 27 hit with their song "Mendocino" (from the album of the same name) in early 1969.

The singers Kate & Anna McGarrigle wrote and sang the 1976 song "Talk to Me of Mendocino" about someone returning to the happiness of the town after unhappy experiences in New York.

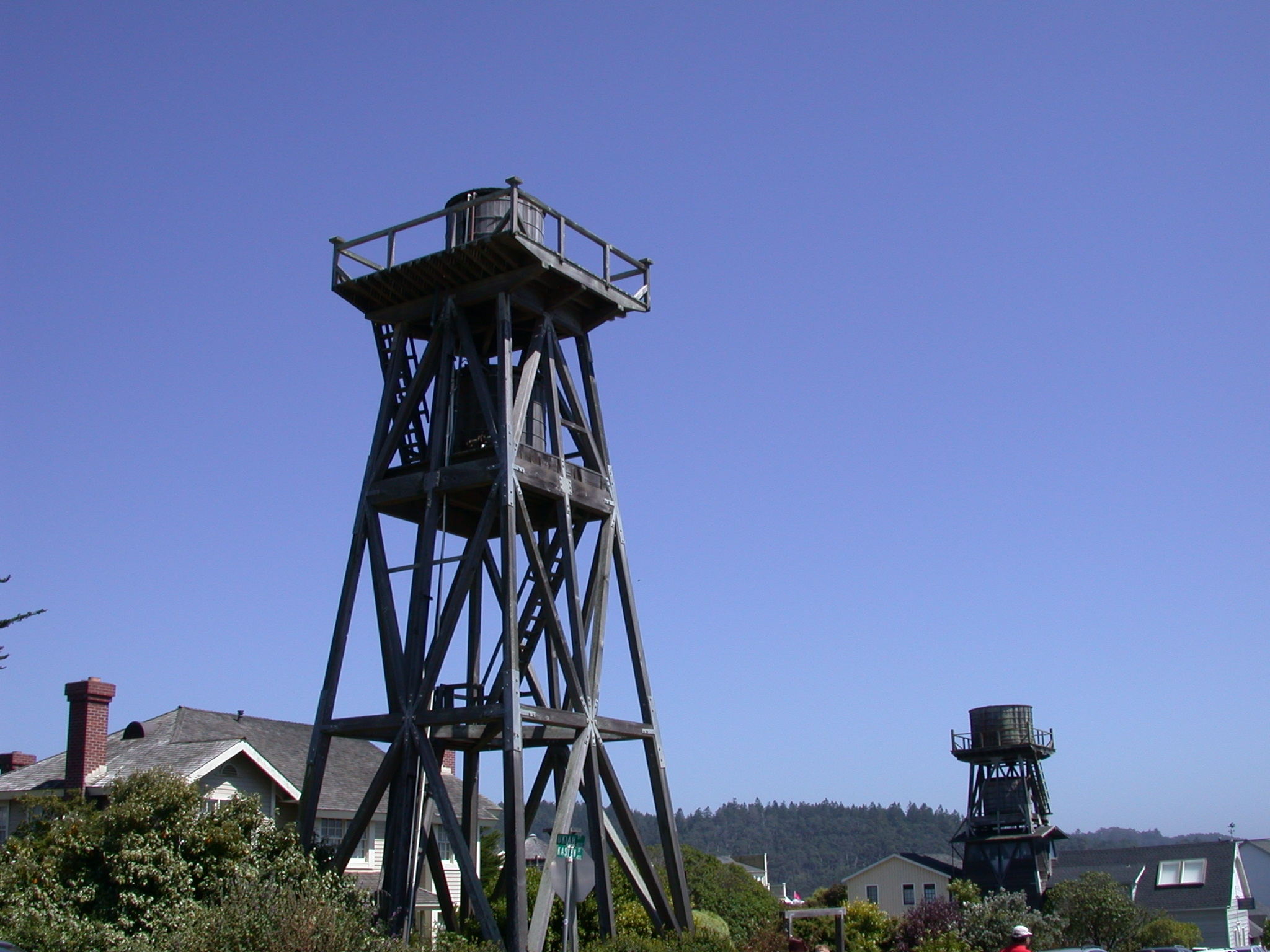
Wooden water towers

The TV series Murder, She Wrote has had perhaps the largest impact on the community in recent years. Murder, She Wrote was set in the fictional town of Cabot Cove, Maine. Nine episodes of the 264-episode program were filmed in Mendocino, while exterior shots throughout Mendocino were used in the remaining episodes. The program was broadcast for 12 seasons, from September 1984 until May 1996 on CBS. Local residents looked forward to the yearly filming, as over a hundred and fifty were chosen to play background parts. A few were cast for speaking roles. Poet, playwright and actor Lawrence Bullock cites being cast in a speaking role as a "Townsperson" in the episode "Indian Giver" as giving him eligibility to join the Screen Actors' Guild. Locals, including Linda Pack and James Henderson, were also cast in speaking roles. The residence of the main character Jessica Fletcher was an actual home in Mendocino and is now a bed and breakfast under the name "Blair House."

While scenes for Murder, She Wrote were being filmed in Mendocino, residents say that it was common to see Angela Lansbury, who played Jessica Fletcher, stop to speak with a toddler, or for Tom Bosley to sign his autograph on a Glad Bag box presented by a shopper stepping out of the local grocery store. Murder, She Wrote also brought in more money to the town due to increased tourism—by some estimates, around $2,000,000. The local high school band appeared in one of the episodes and received enough money from the appearance to go on a band trip.

Cliffs of Mendocino, a musical arrangement composed by Alan Lee Silva that is designed for developing middle and high school bands, was also inspired by and named after the community.

== Sister city ==
Mendocino is a sister city with Miasa, Japan, a relationship formed due to the friendship of Mendocino artist Bill Zacha and Japanese artist Tōshi Yoshida that was formalized in 1980. Every other year, Miasa students visit Mendocino middle school students.

== See also ==
- Mendocino Unified School District
