= Henry Meiggs =

American businessman (1811–1877)

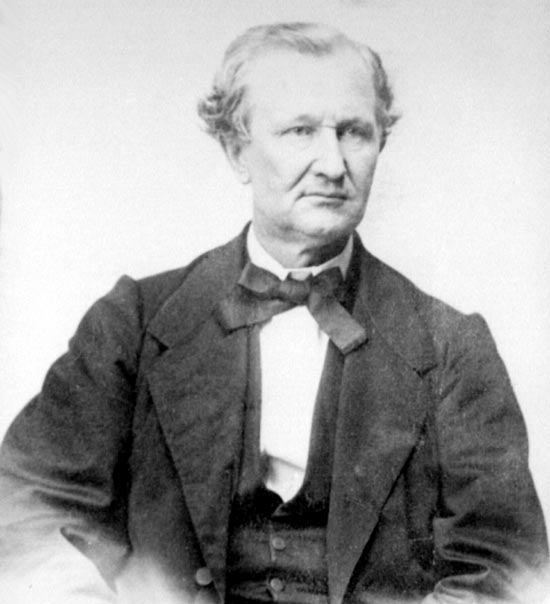
- Born: July 7, 1811; Boston, Massachusetts, US
- Died: September 30, 1877 (aged 66); Lima, Peru
- Other name: Enrique Meiggs
- Occupation: Businessman

Henry Meiggs (July 7, 1811 – September 30, 1877), known in Chile and Peru as Enrique Meiggs, was an American businessman.

== Business career ==
=== Lumber ===
Born on July 7, 1811, in Boston, Meiggs came to New York City in 1835 and began a lumber business that was ruined by the Panic of 1837. He restarted his business in Brooklyn, but again met with failure. Finding success in sending lumber to the Pacific Coast, he relocated to San Francisco during the peak of the California Gold Rush on the cargo ship Albany, laden with lumber, which he sold there for 20 times its cost. He established his first sawmill in Mendocino County, California, which became the Mendocino Lumber Company.

=== Real estate ===
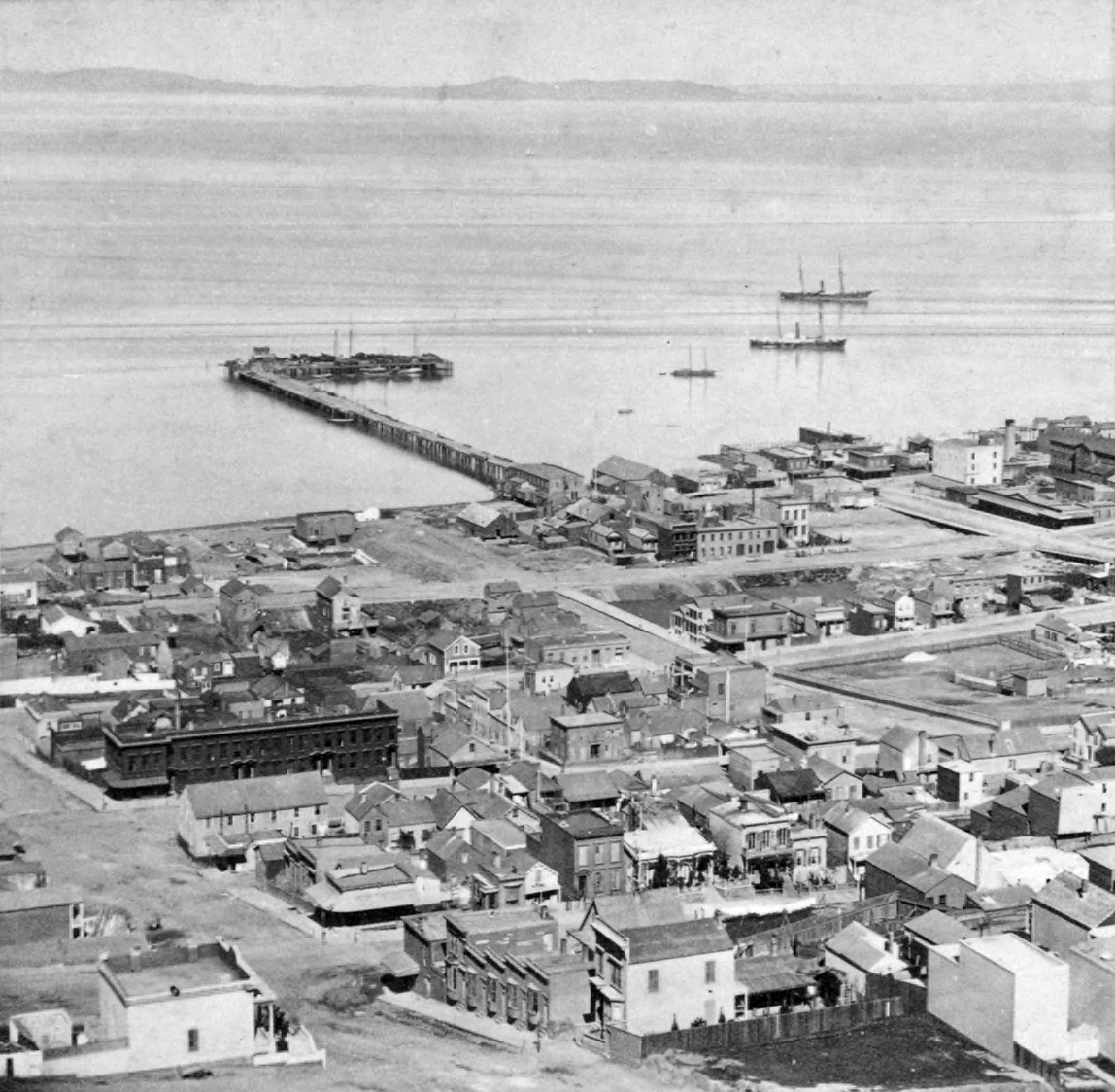
Meiggs Wharf

When Meiggs arrived in San Francisco in 1849, he, like many others, got into real estate speculation. In Meiggs' case, he promoted the possibility of piers along the north shore area, on the grounds that it was closer to the Golden Gate than the usual harbor, located just south of Broadway Street on the shore of what is today downtown San Francisco. Today, the site of Meiggs' Wharf, in its day a marvel extending two thousand feet into the Bay, is occupied by part of Fisherman's Wharf, Pier 39, and Pier 45. To that end, he built warehouses, streets and piers in the area, and constructed sawmills and schooners.

Meiggs became over-extended financially in trying to do this. In order to make ends meet, he illicitly obtained a book full of warrants on the Street Fund (which had little money in it), which the city's controller and mayor had fallen into the habit of signing by the book in advance. Meiggs forged the remaining information and raised money.

=== Railroads ===
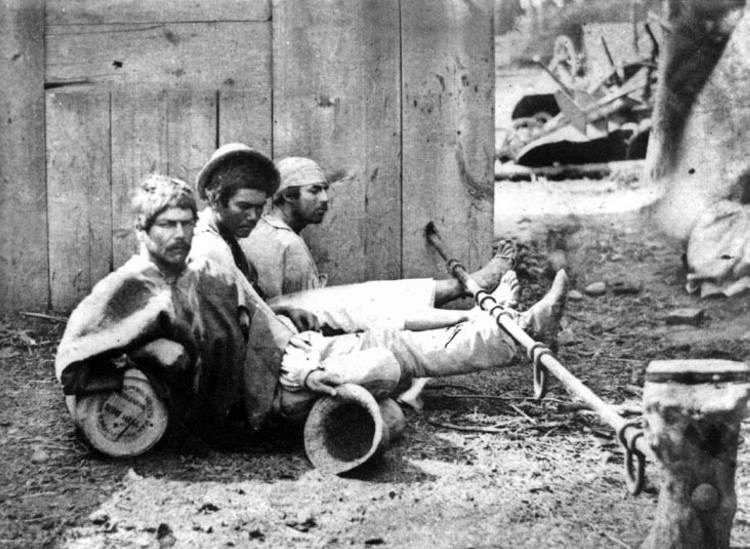
Punishment of peons employed by railroad tycoon Henry Meiggs in Chile or Peru, 1862

Before his fraud was discovered, Meiggs left San Francisco on October 6, 1854, in the brig American, heading for South America. According to him, he landed with only $8,000 (his fraud raised, by some accounts, half a million), lost it immediately, and had to pawn his watch.

Meiggs became a successful railroad builder, building the second railroad in Chile, between Santiago and Valparaíso. After building himself a mansion in Chile with his immense fortunes, he moved his career on to Peru in the mid-1860s. He built a railroad from Lima – the capital city – to the Altiplano, which has an altitude of 14,000 feet. He built many railroads in Peru, and died in 1877 in Lima, Peru while constructing a railroad in Costa Rica which was completed by his nephew, Minor C. Keith. He is said to have been the virtual dictator of Peru by that time, known as "Don Enrique,” with interests ranging from silver mines to cleaning up the city of Lima by building a seven-mile-long park.

In 1876–1877, he financed French adventurer Théodore Ber for an archaeological expedition to Tiwanaku, Bolivia, against the promise that Ber would donate the artifacts he found, on behalf of Meiggs, to Washington's Smithsonian Institution and the American Museum of Natural History in New York.

While his Peruvian contracts were wildly profitable, by 1876, his financial situation had begun to disintegrate. He found it more difficult to obtain credit. His 1877 death only worsened the economic chaos in Peru. He was buried at Cementerio Presbítero Matías Maestro in downtown Lima.

== Legacy ==
Meiggs is said to have paid back every cent he obtained by the warrant fraud, and his other debts, amounting to as much as a million dollars, refusing only to pay back speculators who obtained the warrants at deep discounts. In preparation for his never-to-occur return to San Francisco, he got the State Legislature to pass a bill making it illegal to try him for offenses occurring before 1855. The bill was vetoed by the governor.

As a result of Meiggs' adventures and escapades in Latin America, he left the economies of many countries in desperate conditions. Meiggs allowed for the economic systems of Chile and Peru to be ruled by exports to European nations, which weakened their abilities to develop their domestic trade systems. However, his endeavors to make money for himself proved futile, for the majority of his money was sent out of the country.

In 1977, one hundred years after Meiggs' death, Judge Harry W. Low of the California Superior Court, in San Francisco, granted a motion to quash the indictment against Meiggs stemming from the fraud, on the grounds that Meiggs had rehabilitated himself, and had gone to a Higher Court. This marked the conclusion of a lengthy campaign by Meiggs' supporters to clear him.

An EC2 type Liberty Ship would also carry his name. The USS Henry Meiggs, hull 2788 was launched on April 17, 1944. She was scrapped in 1971.

Meiggs is credited with founding the town of Meiggsville, later renamed Mendocino.

== In popular culture ==
- Monumental Mysteries, a 2013 Travel Channel program, featured a segment on Meiggs centering on the financing of the construction of Fisherman's Wharf. Meiggs was portrayed by Paul Meltzer.
