= Comptche, California =

Comptche
- Census-designated place
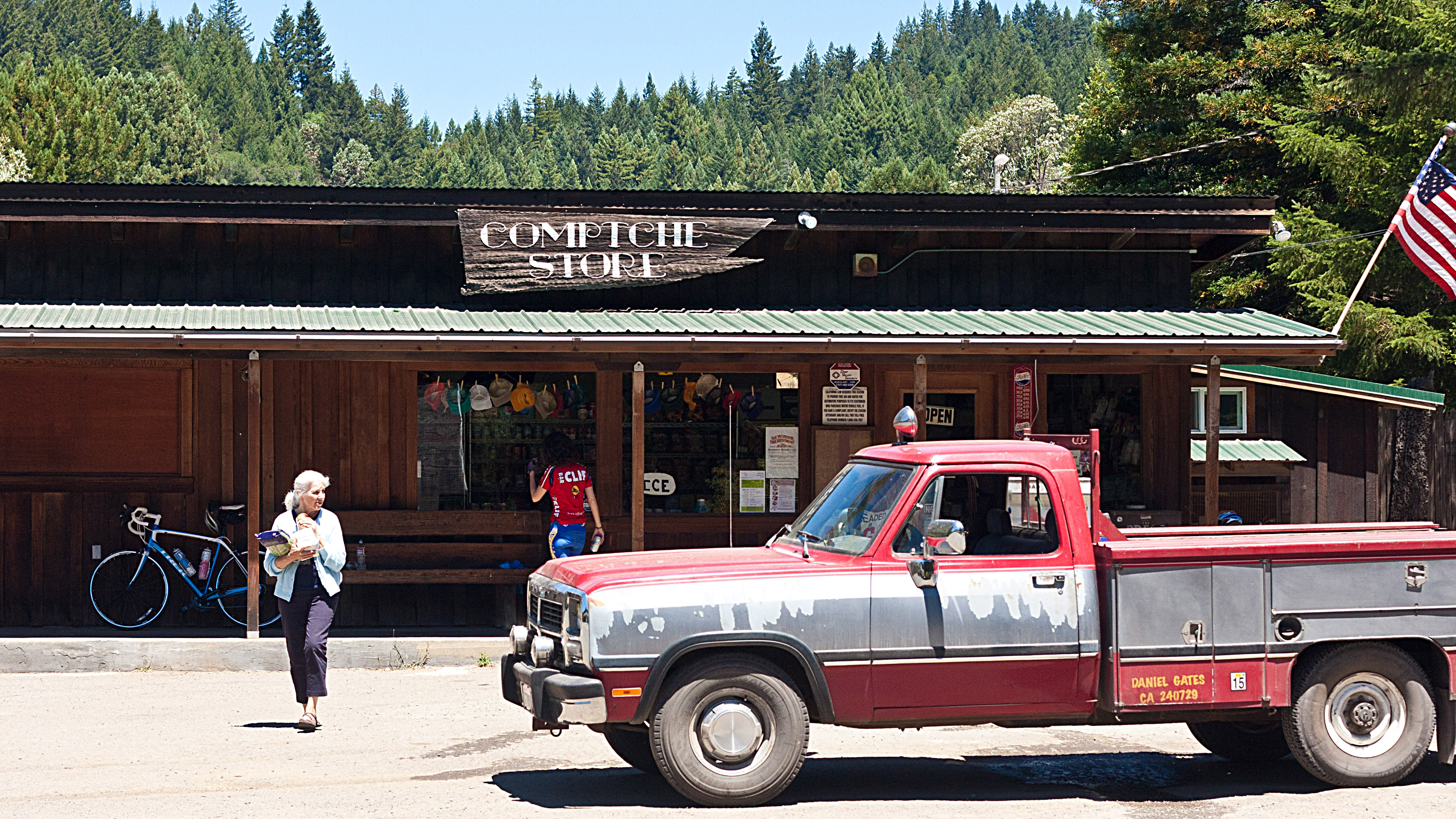

- Location in Mendocino County and California

- Location within California Location within the United States
- Coordinates: 39°15′54″N 123°35′28″W
- Country: United States
- State: California
- County: Mendocino

Area
  - Total: 1.15 sq mi (3.0 km^{2})
  - Land: 1.15 sq mi (3.0 km^{2})
  - Water: 0.00 sq mi (0 km^{2}) 0%
- Elevation: 187 ft (57 m)

Population (2020)
  - Total: 167
  - Density: 144.71/sq mi (55.87/km^{2})
- Time zone: UTC-8 (PST)
  - Summer (DST): UTC-7 (PDT)
- ZIP code: 95427
- Area code: 707
- GNIS feature IDs: 255911; 2628722

Comptche (Pomo: Compatche, meaning "In the valley among the hills") is an unincorporated community and census-designated place (CDP) in Mendocino County, California, United States. It is located 17 miles (27 km) southeast of Fort Bragg at an elevation of 187 feet (57 m). The population was 167 at the 2020 census.

== History ==
The Comptche post office opened in 1877, closed later that same year, and reopened in 1879. Although the precise origin of the town's name is unknown, there was a village of the Pomo people named Komacho nearby.

== Geography ==
Comptche is located in west-central Mendocino County at 39°15′54″N 123°35′28″W (39.2648954, -123.5911224). It is in ZIP code 95427 and lies at the junction of three minor roads. Comptche–Ukiah Road extends west from Comptche 15 miles (24 km) to Mendocino on State Route 1, while to the east Orr Springs Road leads 30 miles (48 km) to Ukiah on U.S. 101 (passing through Montgomery Woods State Natural Reserve approximately halfway to Ukiah). Flynn Creek Road leads southward from Comptche 8 miles (13 km) to State Route 128 in Navarro River Redwoods State Park, near the town of Navarro. Flynn Creek Road and the western segment of Comptche–Ukiah Road provide an alternative route between Mendocino and the Anderson Valley, used in winter storms when the Navarro River floods Route 128.

According to the United States Census Bureau, the Comptche CDP covers an area of 1.2 square miles (3.1 km^{2}), all land. The Albion River runs along the southern edge of the community, flowing west to the Pacific Ocean at Albion.

== Demographics ==
Historical population
Census	Pop.	Note	%±
2010	159		—
2020	167		5.0%
U.S. Decennial Census; 1850–1870 1880-1890; 1900 1910 1920; 1930 1940 1950; 1960 1970 1980; 1990 2000 2010

=== 2020 census ===
As of the 2020 census, Comptche had a population of 167. The population density was 144.7 inhabitants per square mile (55.9/km^{2}). The median age was 43.5 years. 15.6% of residents were under the age of 18 and 22.2% of residents were 65 years of age or older. For every 100 females there were 87.6 males, and for every 100 females age 18 and over there were 95.8 males age 18 and over.

0.0% of residents lived in urban areas, while 100.0% lived in rural areas.

The age distribution was 26 people (15.6%) under the age of 18, 5 people (3.0%) aged 18 to 24, 54 people (32.3%) aged 25 to 44, 45 people (26.9%) aged 45 to 64, and 37 people (22.2%) who were 65 years of age or older. There were 78 males and 89 females.

The whole population lived in households. There were 76 households in Comptche, of which 11 (14.5%) had children under the age of 18 living in them. Of all households, 31 (40.8%) were married-couple households, 7 (9.2%) were cohabiting couple households, 12 (15.8%) had a male householder with no spouse or partner present, and 26 (34.2%) had a female householder with no spouse or partner present. 29 households (38.2%) were one person, and 20 (26.3%) were one person aged 65 or older. The average household size was 2.2. There were 37 families (48.7% of all households).

There were 85 housing units at an average density of 73.7 units per square mile (28.5 units/km^{2}), of which 76 (89.4%) were occupied and 10.6% were vacant. The homeowner vacancy rate was 2.2% and the rental vacancy rate was 0.0%. Of the occupied units, 44 (57.9%) were owner-occupied, and 32 (42.1%) were occupied by renters.

Racial composition as of the 2020 census
Race	Number	Percent
White	137	82.0%
Black or African American	0	0.0%
American Indian and Alaska Native	7	4.2%
Asian	0	0.0%
Native Hawaiian and Other Pacific Islander	0	0.0%
Some other race	3	1.8%
Two or more races	20	12.0%
Hispanic or Latino (of any race)	15	9.0%

=== 2010 census ===
Comptche first appeared as a census designated place in the 2010 U.S. census.

== Politics ==
In the state legislature, Comptche is in the 2nd senatorial district, represented by Democrat Mike McGuire, and the 2nd Assembly district, represented by Democrat Chris Rogers.

Federally, Comptche is in California's 2nd congressional district, represented by Democrat Jared Huffman.

== Education ==
Comptche is in the Mendocino Unified School District.

== Bibliography ==
- Pogash, Carol (July 7, 2008). "With Pride, Californians Step Up to Fight Fires". New York Times.
