= Big Salmon Creek (California) =

Stream in Mendocino County, California (USA), north of Albion

- Location of the mouth of Big Salmon Creek in California

Location
- Country: United States
- State: California
- County: Mendocino

Physical characteristics
- Source
  - location: near Elk, California
  - coordinates: 39°13′12″N 123°40′7″W
- Mouth: Pacific Ocean
  - location: northwest of Albion
  - coordinates: 39°12′57″N 123°46′7″W

Basin features
- Tributaries
  - right: Little Salmon Creek

Big Salmon Creek is a stream in Mendocino County, California in the United States.

== See also ==
- List of rivers of California
