= Fort Bragg and Southeastern Railroad =

Former railway line in California, US

Coordinates: 39.22582°N 123.76725°W

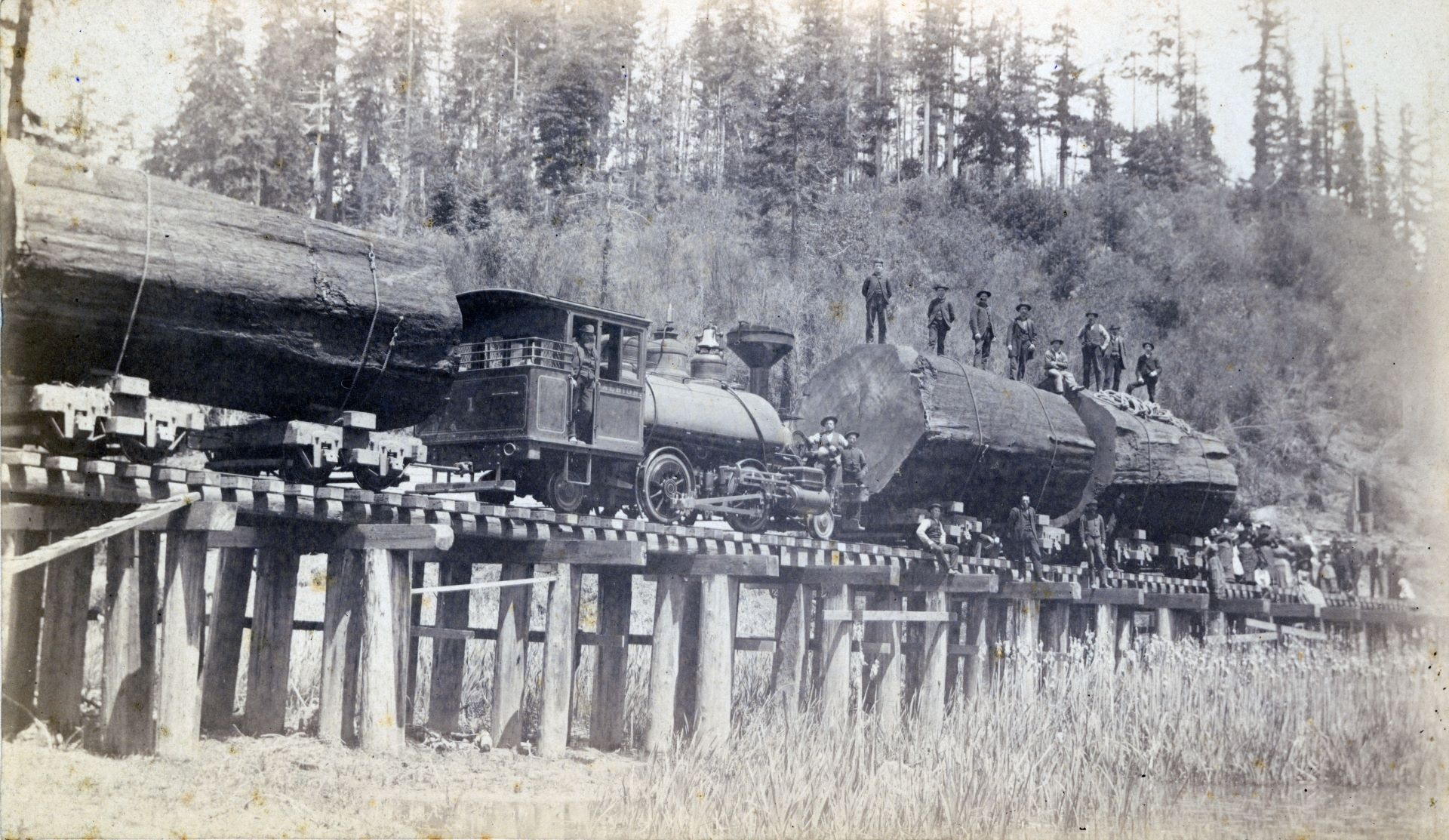
- Baldwin 2-4-2T No. 1 'Albion', c. 1885

Overview
- Locale: Mendocino County, California

Technical
- Track gauge: 4 ft 8 1/2 in (1,435 mm) standard gauge

The Fort Bragg and Southeastern Railroad was formed by Atchison, Topeka and Santa Fe Railway as a consolidation of logging railways extending inland from Albion, California on the coast of Mendocino County. The railroad and its predecessors operated from August 1, 1885 to January 16, 1930. The line was merged into the regional Northwestern Pacific Railroad in 1907; but planned physical connection was never completed.

== History ==
Captain William A. Richardson built a sawmill at the mouth of the Albion River in 1853. This logging operation incorporated the Albion River Railroad Company on September 24, 1885 to haul logs down the Albion River to the sawmill. The railroad extended 11.6 miles (18.7 km) to Keene's summit when it was reorganized with the sawmill on May 26, 1891 as the Albion Lumber Company with headquarters in San Francisco. Lumber was loaded onto ships from a wharf at the mouth for the Albion River for drying and planing in San Francisco.

H. B. Tichnor and Company built a sawmill at the mouth of the Navarro River in 1861. This logging operation was reorganized as the Navarro Mill Company in 1886 and loaded lumber onto ships from a millside wharf. Navarro Mill Company had extended a logging railroad 14 miles (23 km) up the Navarro River by the time the sawmill burned in 1902. The focus of logging operations in the Navarro River watershed then shifted to the community of Wendling, near the upstream extent of the Navarro Mill Company railway.

The Albion and Southeastern Railroad was formed on April 1, 1902 to purchase the railway from the Albion Lumber Company and extend it into the Anderson Valley of the Navarro River to Boonville, California. The Santa Fe Railway incorporated the Fort Bragg and Southeastern Railroad on March 25, 1903 with intention to extend the Albion and Southeastern through the Dry Creek drainage for a connection with national railway system at Healdsburg, California. The Fort Bragg and Southeastern completed construction from Keene's Summit to Wendling on September 15, 1905. Switchbacks were required near Keene's Summit. A. G. Stearns built a sawmill in Wendling in 1905. The Wendling sawmill was reorganized as the Navarro Lumber Company in 1914. The community of Wendling was renamed Navarro as the local population shifted from the old coastal community of Navarro (which changed its name to Navarro-by-the-sea) to follow the logging and milling jobs.

The Fort Bragg and Southeastern was included in the Northwestern Pacific Railroad merger on January 8, 1907. Southern Pacific Transportation Company purchased the Albion Lumber Company in 1907 to manufacture ties and bridge timbers for railway construction in Mexico. The Albion Lumber Company purchased the Navarro Lumber Company in May 1920. The Fort Bragg and Southeastern was extended 3 miles (4.8 km) past Wendling to a point known as Christine, and a branch line extended one mile up the Albion River from Clearbrook Junction. Albion Lumber Company trackage extended the Clearbrook branch 8 miles (13 km) toward Comptche, California and Navarro Lumber Company trackage extended 4 miles (6.4 km) past Christine. There were numerous shorter logging branches owned by the lumber companies, but trains never reached Boonville or Healdsburg. Operation of the Navarro sawmill ended in September 1927; and the last log went through the Albion sawmill on May 19, 1928. The railroad ceased operation on January 16, 1930 and was dismantled for scrap in 1937.

== Route ==
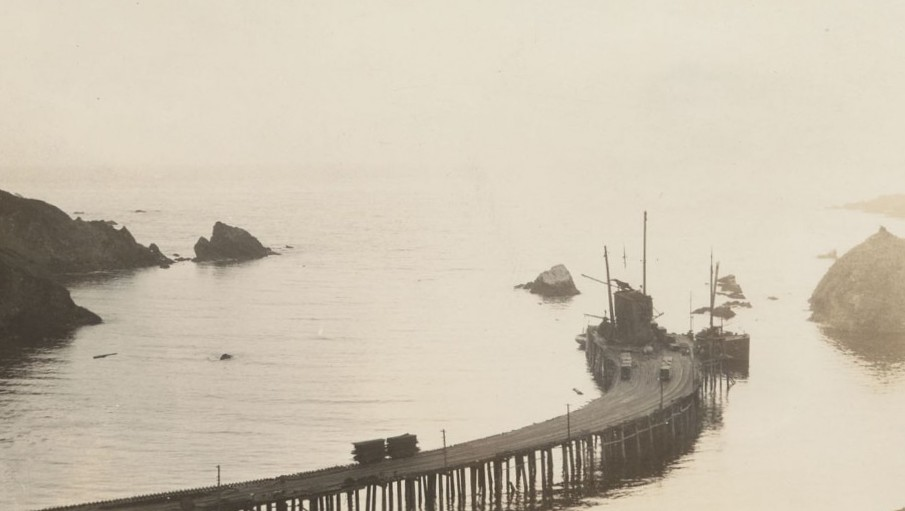
Albion Lumber Company wharf. Loading was directly to vessel, 1920

- Milepost 0 - Albion wharf (2-stall Roundhouse built 1891 and dismantled in 1937)
- Milepost 3.25 - Brett
- Milepost 7.32 - Clearbrook Junction
- Milepost 8.30 - Gunari
- Milepost 12.37 - Sunny Slope
- Milepost 13.05 - Skibo (water tank)
- Milepost 14.65 - switchback
- Milepost 15.44 - Keene summit elevation 611 feet (186 m)
- Milepost 15.65 - switchback
- Milepost 16.54 - Dunn (water tank)
- Milepost 22.15 - Stearn's sawmill
- Milepost 22.87 - Wendling (1-stall Roundhouse built 1905 and dismantled in 1937)
- Milepost 25.65 - Christine

== Locomotives ==
The first Albion River Railroad steam locomotive was Baldwin 2-4-2T No. 1 'Albion'. Later a Porter, a Hinkley, two other Baldwins, two Limas and a Ford Model T with a Martin-Parry freight and jitney body were used.

Number	Builder	Type	Date	Works number	Notes
1	H. K. Porter, Inc	2-4-2 Tank locomotive	1887	905	formerly National City and Otay Railroad #5; to Fort Bragg and Southeastern in 1905; became Northwestern Pacific Railroad #225 in 1907; scrapped 1937
2	Hinkley Locomotive Works	0-6-0	1880		originally Santa Fe Railroad #122, renumbered #2232; to Fort Bragg and Southeastern in 1905; became Northwestern Pacific Railroad #226 in 1907; scrapped 1910
	Lima Locomotive Works	wood-burning 3-cylinder Shay locomotive	27 March 1906	1669	built as Albion Lumber Company #123; renumbered #2 in 1921; scrapped in 1937
	Lima Locomotive Works	Shay locomotive	5 March 1907	1906	built as Stearns Lumber Company #1; became Navarro Lumber Company #1 in 1914; became Albion Lumber Company #1 in August 1921; scrapped in 1937
	Baldwin Locomotive Works	2-6-2	1903	22474	built as oil-burning 2-6-2T California Northwestern Railway #34; became Northwestern Pacific Railroad #202 in 1907; side tanks retained when tender added in 1910; converted to wood-burning for assignment to the former Fort Bragg and Southeastern in 1912; converted back to oil fuel in 1923; scrapped in 1937

== Photographs ==
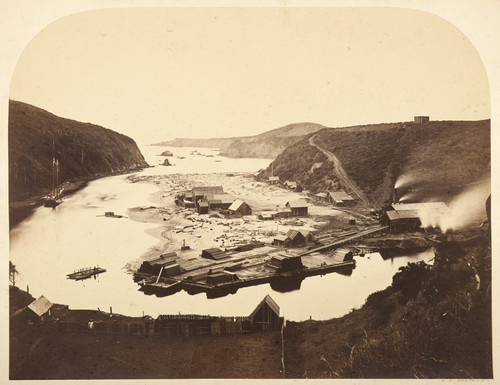
Albion Lumber Company Mill

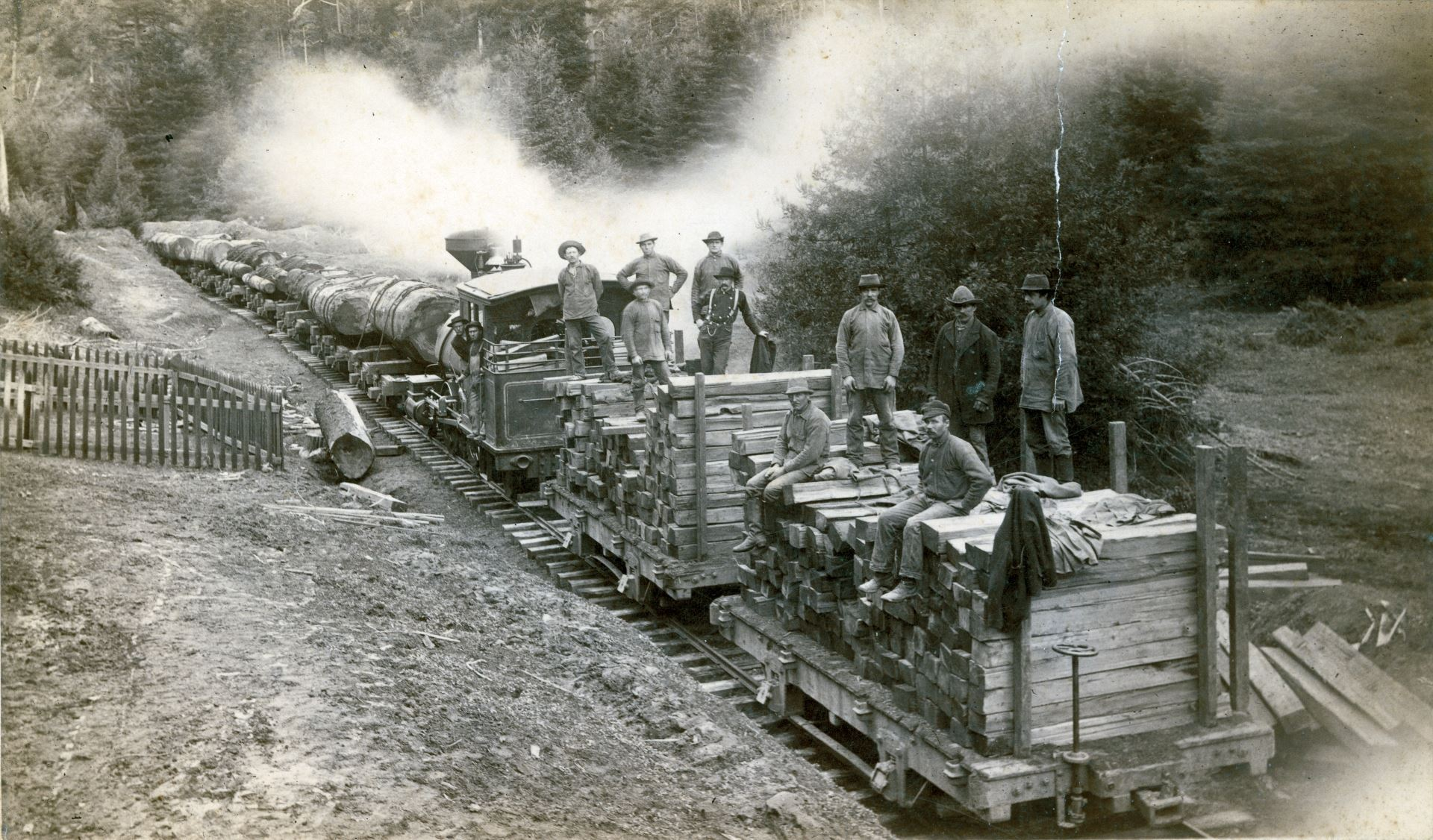
No.1 'Albion' hauling a long string of 'bob cars' (disconnected trucks) and a load of narrow gauge ties (sleepers)

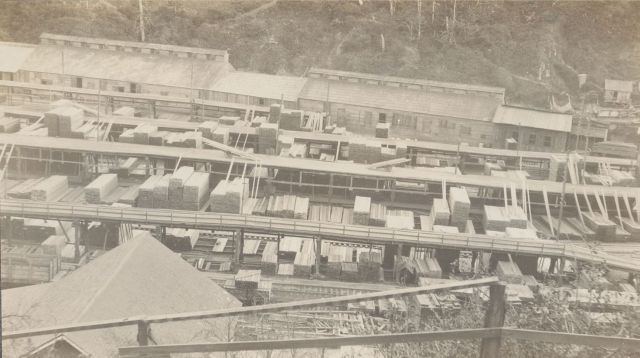
Yards, gangways and warehouses. Gangways were on same level as sorting table floor, 1920

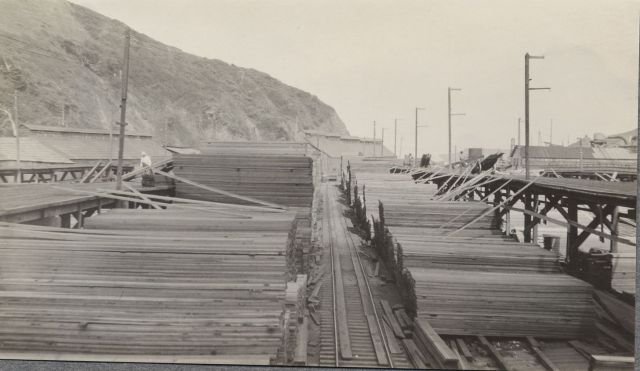
Yards of Albion Lumber Company at Albion, 1920

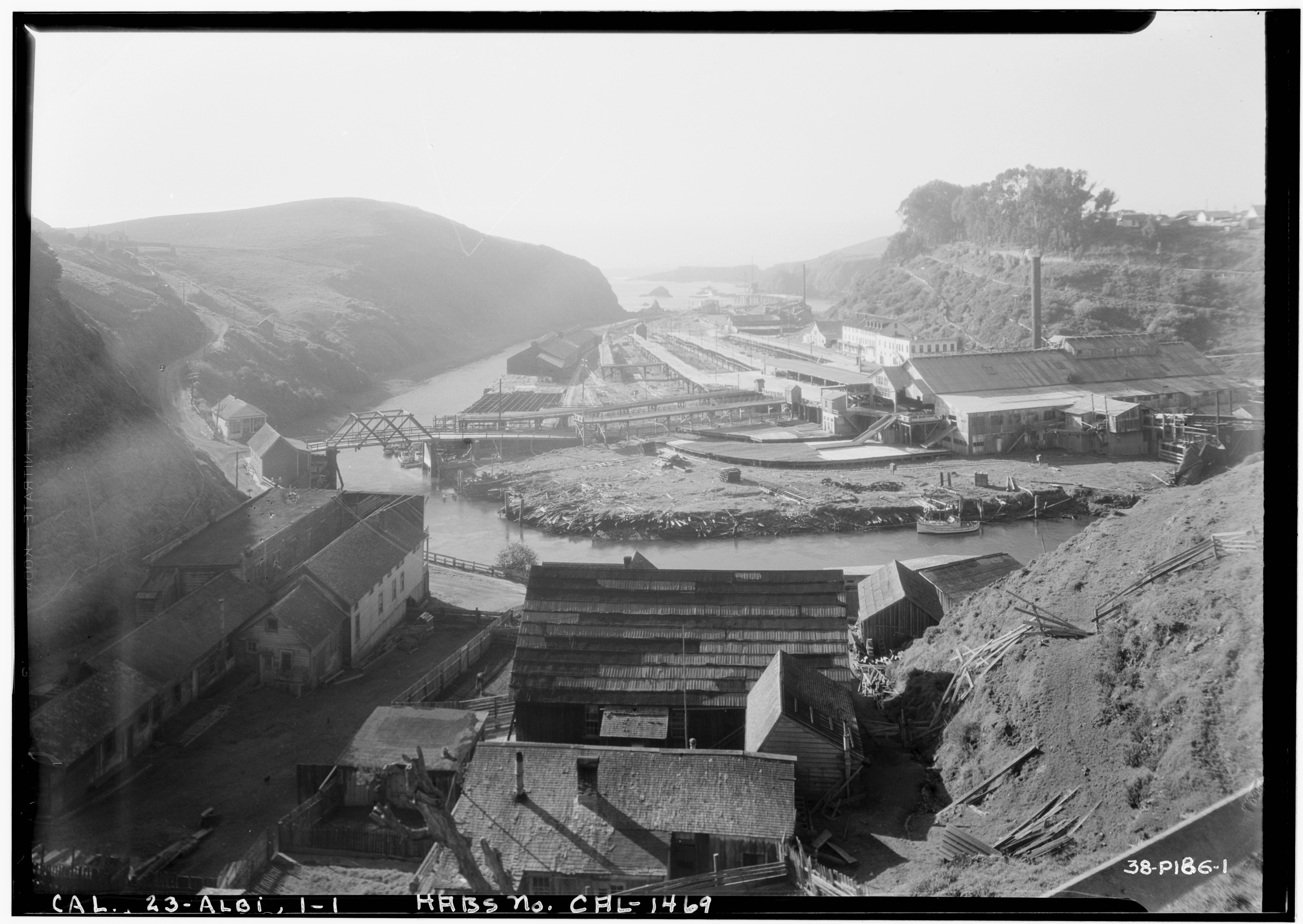
Albion Lumber Company at Albion, 1934
