= Biological station =

Facility focused on biological research

Biological stations (also known as biological field stations) are research stations specializing in biology and ecology. Their size and purpose varies, mainly regarding research, conservation and education. They are located in all biomes, including aquatic ones. Students, other scientists and the public are the aim public of these sites. Many are focused on protected ecosystems. Data from 157 field stations in 56 countries show that their presence improved habitat quality and reduced hunting rates and spatial analyses support field station presence as reducing deforestation.

Many stations in the Americas are coordinated (but not owned, controlled or funded by) the Organization of Biological Field Stations.

== Stations ==
- Albion Field Station
- Cocha Cashu Biological Station
- Crommelin Biological Field Station
- Kalamos Island biological field station
- La MICA Biological Station
- Puhtu Biological Station
- Robert J. Bernard Field Station
- Rocky Mountain Biological Laboratory
- Wayqecha Biological Station
