= Elk, California =

Elk, California may refer to:

- Elk, Fresno County, California
- Elk, Mendocino County, California
