= Greenwood State Beach =

State park in California, United States

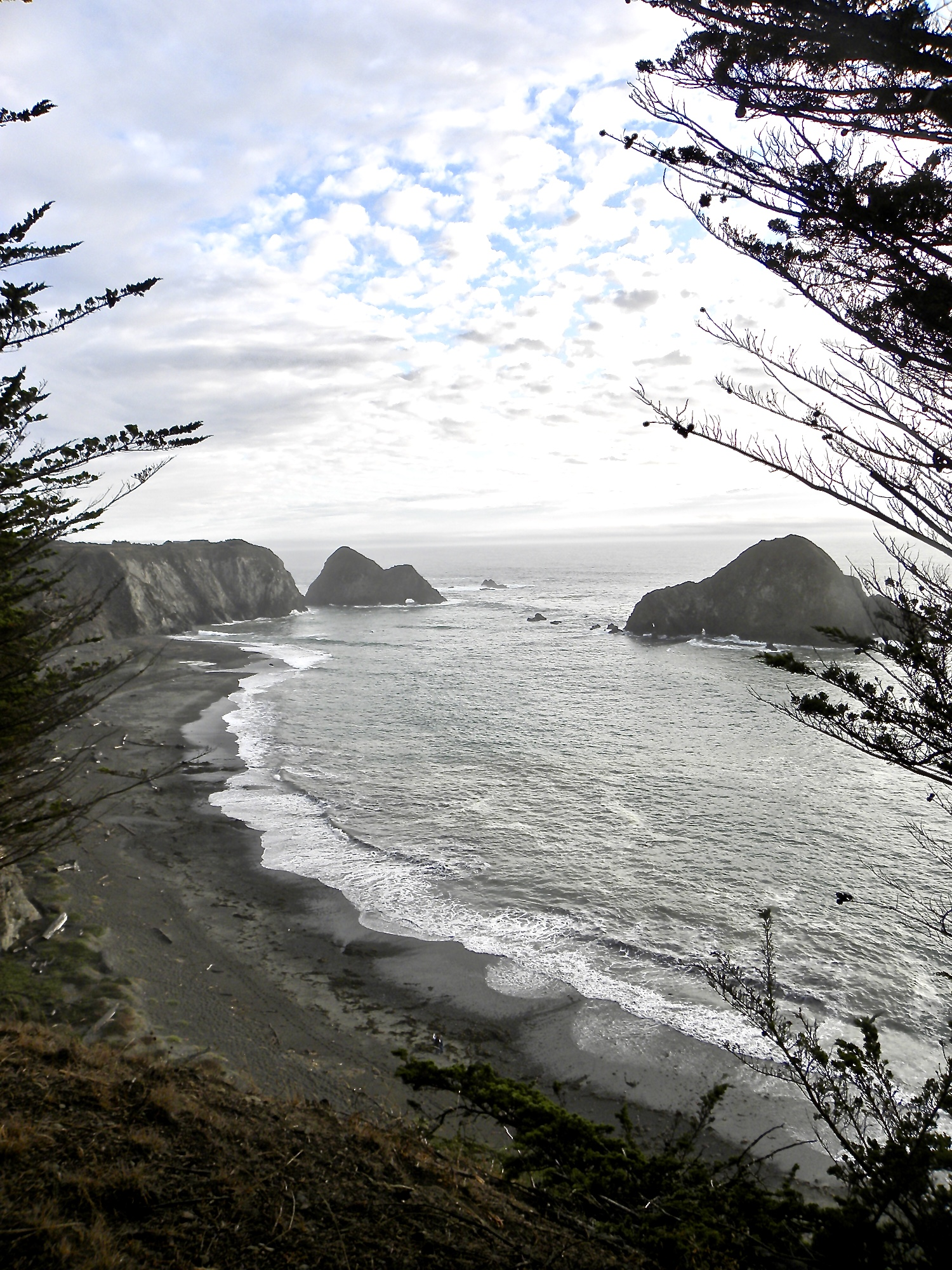
- Greenwood State Beach and islands

- Location within California Location within the United States
- Location: Mendocino County, California, United States
- Nearest city: Elk, California
- Coordinates: 39°7′50″N 123°43′10″W
- Area: 47 acres (19 ha)
- Established: 1978
- Governing body: California Department of Parks and Recreation

Greenwood State Beach, also known as Elk Beach, is a state-protected beach of California, United States. It is located in the unincorporated village of Elk in Mendocino County. It is located about 15 miles (24 km) north of Point Arena on Highway 1. The 47-acre (19 ha) park was established in 1978.

== History ==
The beach is located in Elk, a lumber town through the 19th century and early twentieth century. It was originally used by the L.E. White Lumber Company, which operated from 1884–1916. The Goodyear Redwood Lumber Company then purchased the land from 1916–1930. The old mill office of the lumber company is now a visitor center for the state beach.

The beach is named after Britton Bailey Greenwood, son of famed mountain man Caleb Greenwood.

In 1995 the beach was renamed from Greenwood Creek State Beach to Greenwood State Beach.

== Proposed for closure ==
Greenwood State Beach is one of 70 California state parks proposed for closure by July 2012 as part of a deficit reduction program.

== See also ==
- California State Beaches
- List of California state parks
