= Albion River Inn =

Bed and breakfast in California, United States

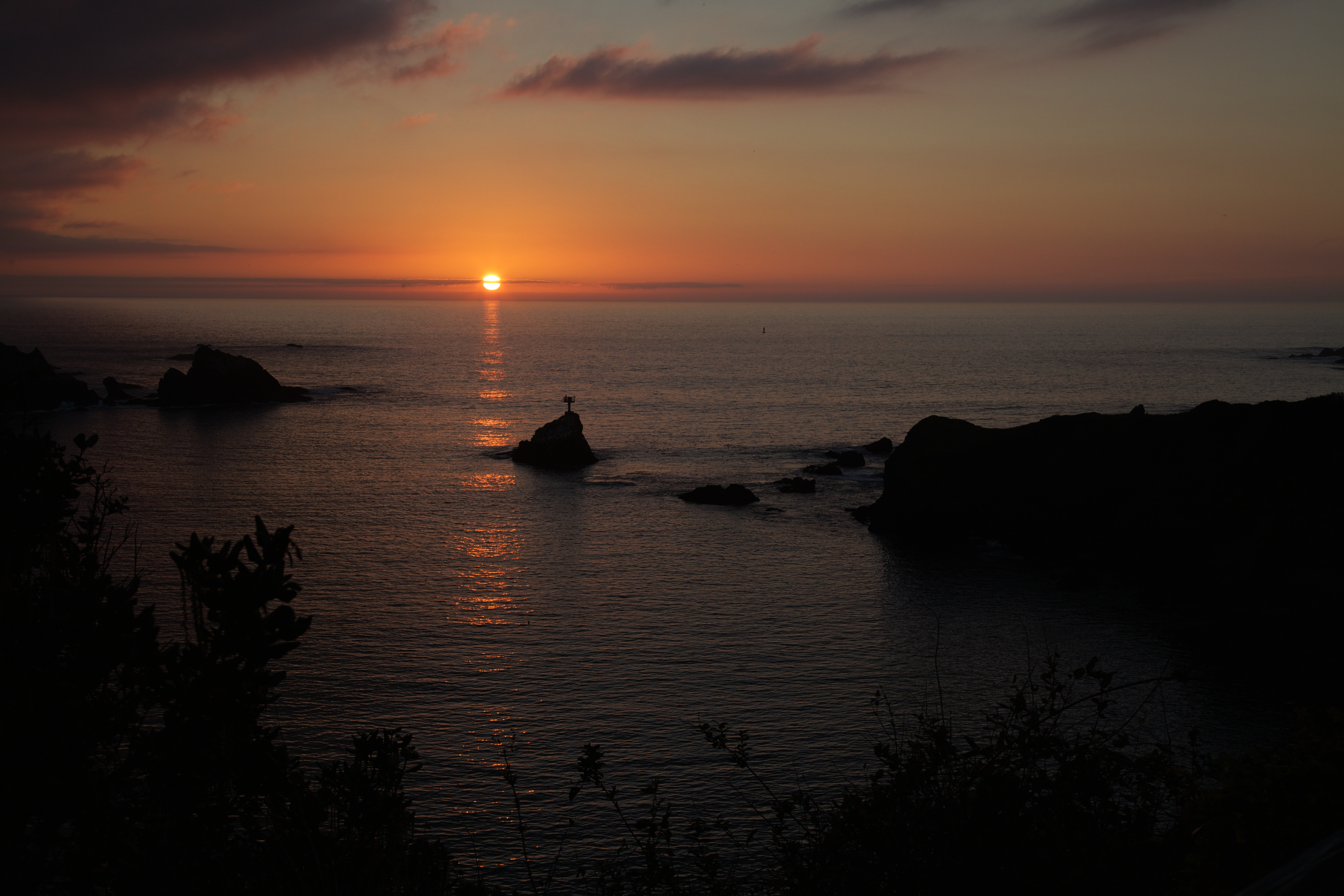
- Sunset view from the Albion River Inn

- Location within California

General information
- Location: Albion, California, United States, 3790 N. Highway 1
- Coordinates: 39°13′47.46″N 123°46′14.92″W
- Opening: 1982
- Owner: Flurry Healy and Peter Wells

Other information
- Number of rooms: 22
- Number of restaurants: 1
- Parking: On site

Website
- Official website

The Albion River Inn is a bed & breakfast located in Albion, California, in the United States. The inn is located on the Mendocino Coast off of California State Route 1.

== History ==
The Albion River Inn is originally located on land that was acquired by a blacksmith in 1916. The first Ford Model A car dealership in the Mendocino area was located on the site. Next, it became a grocery store and then a restaurant. In 1971, Peter Wells moved to Albion, California from London with his wife. Wells met a local man named Flurry Healy. Almost ten years later the property, with two buildings, went up for sale. The two decided to go into business together and purchase it. They completely renovated the buildings. In 1982 the Inn opened. The first chef was Wells' son, David. Stephen Smith, who is now head chef, accompanied David in the kitchen. Smith left and after graduating from the California Culinary Academy, he eventually returned to the Albion River Inn in 1993. The Albion River Inn has been featured in Wine Spectator, Coastal Living, Zagat, Entrepreneur, Departures, and Sunset.

== Facilities ==
The property sits on 10-acres with 22 rooms. Each room has its own private deck and fireplace. There are no televisions. The rooms are designed with "a blend of antiques and modern touches..." Coastal Living describes the guest cottages as "New England–style" in the design.

There is one restaurant with a bar. The restaurant, called Albion River Inn Restaurant, uses local ingredients and specializes in locally caught seafood. The restaurant is one of the original buildings which was built in the early 20th century. It is built out of wood salvaged from the Girlie Mahoney shipwreck. It has 80 seats. It has been awarded the Wine Spectator Award of Excellence nineteen times. As of 2012, there were 130 Scotch whisky's and over 500 bottle of wine on the menu. The restaurant serves California cuisine and overlooks the ocean. The chef is Stephen Smith and Mark Bowery is the sommelier.
