= Albion River Bridge =

Bridge in California

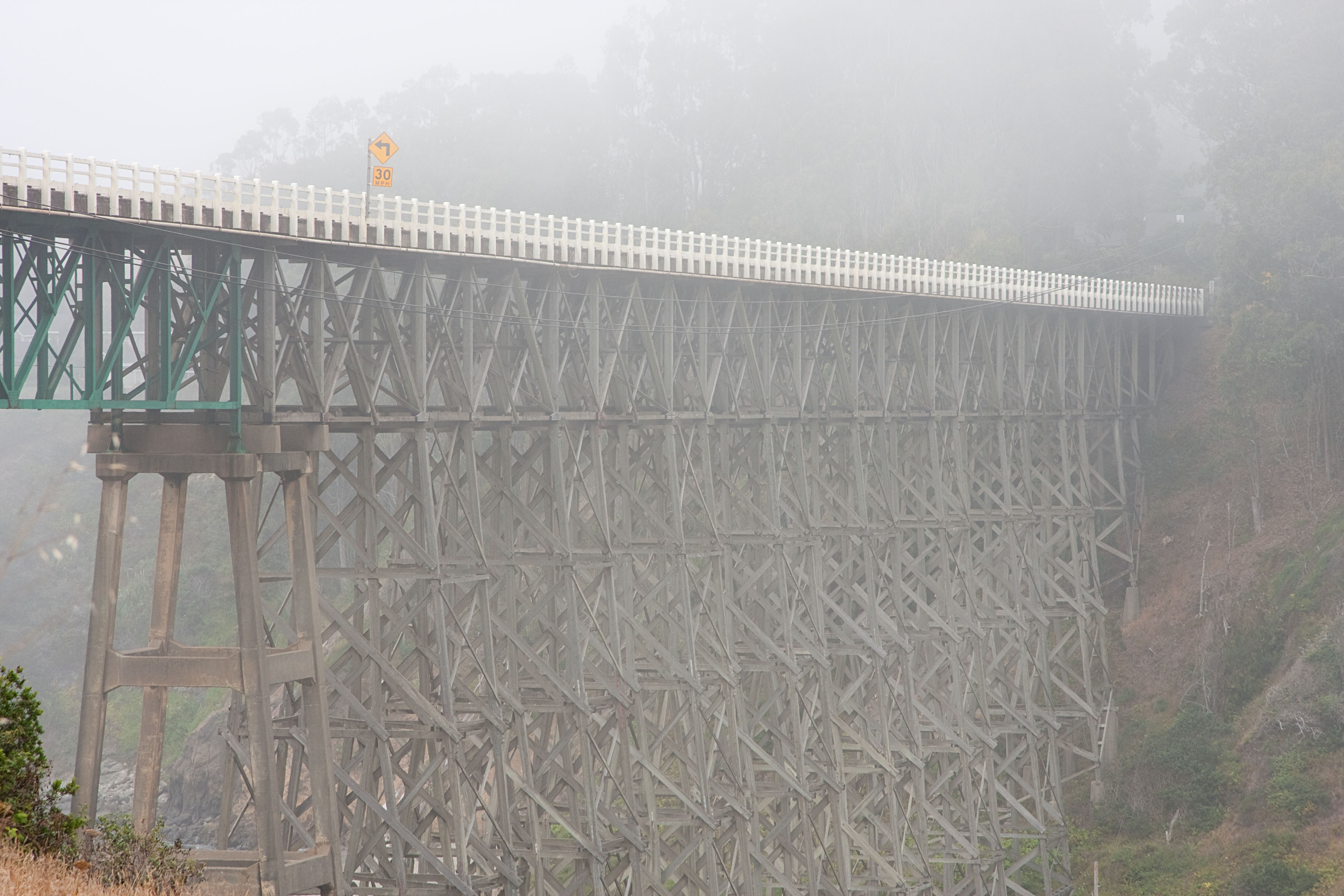
- The Albion River Bridge, looking northwards from Albion, California
- Coordinates: 39.2266°N 123.7691°W
- Carries: SR 1
- Crosses: Albion River
- Locale: Albion, Mendocino County, California, U.S.
- Maintained by: California Department of Transportation
- ID number: CA 10-136, BH 11122

Characteristics
- Design: wooden deck truss bridge
- Material: Wood, with a steel center truss
- Total length: 980 ft (300 m)
- Longest span: 130 ft (40 m)

History
- Construction end: 1944

The Albion River Bridge is a wooden deck truss bridge crossing the Albion River in Mendocino County, California. It is the only remaining wooden bridge on California State Route 1; dramatic views of the bridge are visible from the nearby town of Albion, California. It was listed on the National Register of Historic Places in July 2017.

== Predecessors ==
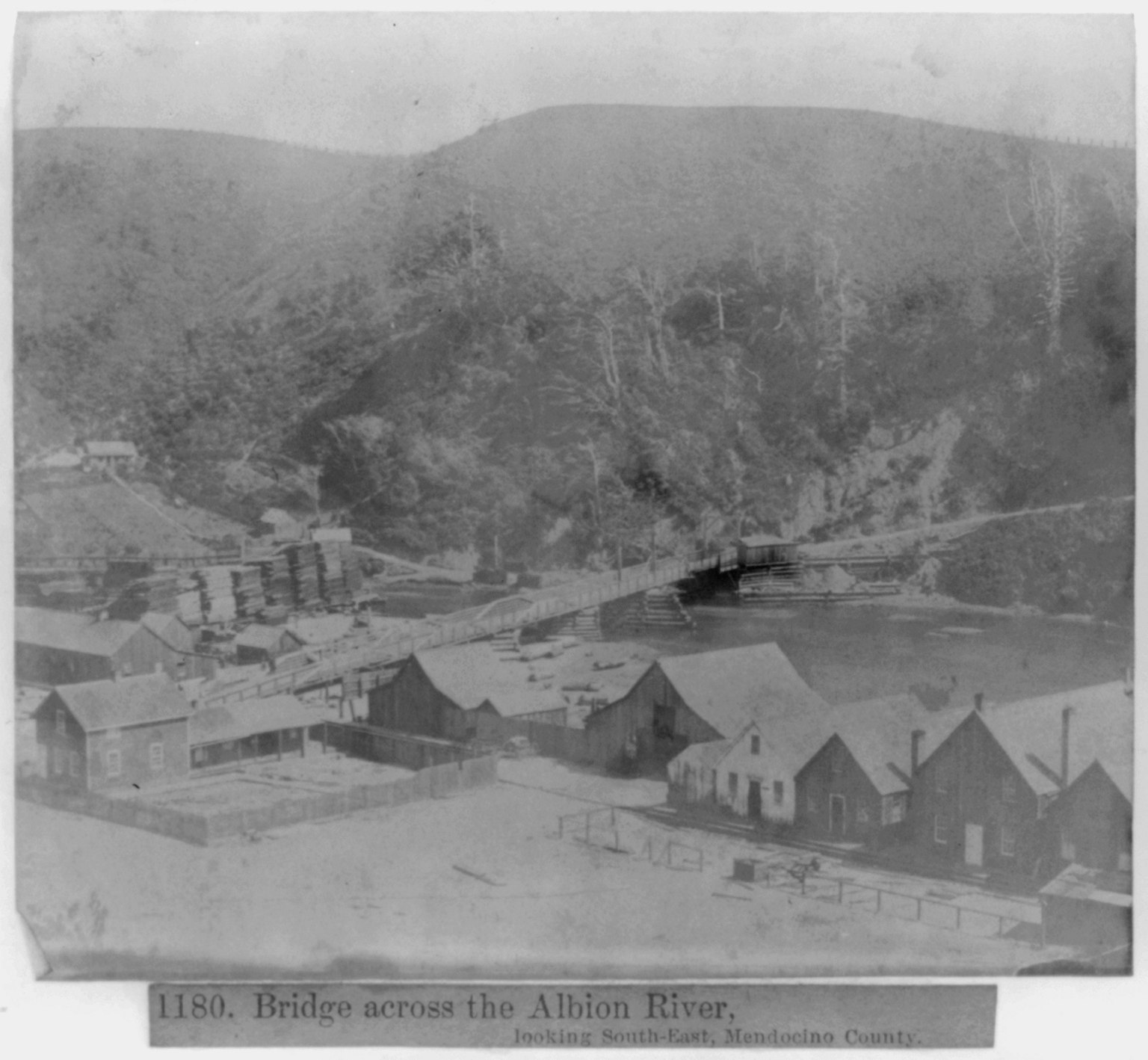
The low bridge across the Albion River in 1866

The Albion River has been crossed by a bridge since 1861, when a state franchise was granted to the Albion Bridge Company (renewed in 1863 to the Albion River Bridge Company). However, until the present bridge was built in 1944, the crossing was low, and could be reached only by treacherous grades up and down the bluffs on either side of the river.

== Construction and specifications ==
The present span was opened in 1944. Because of World War II concrete and steel shortages, it was built of salvaged wood treated with a copper azole preservative. It includes a steel center truss that was salvaged from the South Fork of the Feather River, supported by concrete towers. It is 970 feet (300 m) long and its deck is 26 feet (7.9 m) wide. As of 2000, it carries approximately 3,200 vehicles per day.

== Proposed replacement ==
In 2009, the California Department of Transportation (Caltrans) proposed to replace the bridge and the nearby bridge over Salmon Creek to the south. The timbers of the existing bridge remain in good condition, but the central steel truss has been corroded and needs replacement, and the bridge deck does not meet modern safety standards for its width and rail design, rendering it functionally obsolete. The planned replacement bridge would feature a wider deck with separate pedestrian walkways.

An open house to show residents the plans for a new bridge was held in 2014, with the start of construction estimated for 2018. Caltrans has estimated that a replacement bridge could be in place by 2021. However, in 2015, Albion residents opposed to replacing the bridge filed to have it listed in the National Register of Historic Places, which could potentially slow any replacement. The bridge was added to the National Register on July 31, 2017.
