= Little Salmon Creek (Mendocino County) =

Stream in Mendocino County, California

Location
- Country: United States
- State: California
- Region: Mendocino County

Physical characteristics
- Source: Albion Ridge
  - location: 3.9 miles (6.3 km) east of Albion, California
  - coordinates: 39°12′43″N 123°42′54″W
- Mouth: Big Salmon Creek (California)
  - coordinates: 39°12′56″N 123°45′56″W
  - elevation: 13 ft (4.0 m)

Little Salmon Creek is a westward-flowing stream in Mendocino County, California which empties into Big Salmon Creek near the town of Albion, California.

== See also ==
- List of rivers of California
- Salmon Creek (Sonoma County, California)
