= Petrov Zailenko =

Russian hermit in the United States

- Born: Russia
- Died: August 31, 1981

Petrov "Petro" Zailenko, a.k.a. Pitro Zalenko, known as the "Hendy Hermit" or the "Boonville Hermit," lived in Hendy Woods State Park in California for more than 18 years during the 1960s and '70s in huts of his own construction consisting of redwood plank lean-tos, one of which was located on a hollowed-out tree stump. He subsisted on small game such as chipmunk and produce from nearby farms and obtained clothing discarded by others.

== Biography ==
He was born in Russia, fought in World War II, and was wounded during the war, then entered the U.S. on a Russian trawler without authorization. He was believed to be a Ukrainian Jew.

Zailenko then went to work in a local mill until asked for his Social Security number. He fled into the woods and lived there for 20 years in what is now called the Hermit Hut. He was terrified of anyone in a uniform, and it was thought that he was afraid of being sent back to Russia.

Petro's date and precise place of birth is unknown. He died on August 31, 1981 and his ashes were scattered in Hendy Woods.
