= Fensalden Inn =

Wedding Venue and Vacation Rental in California

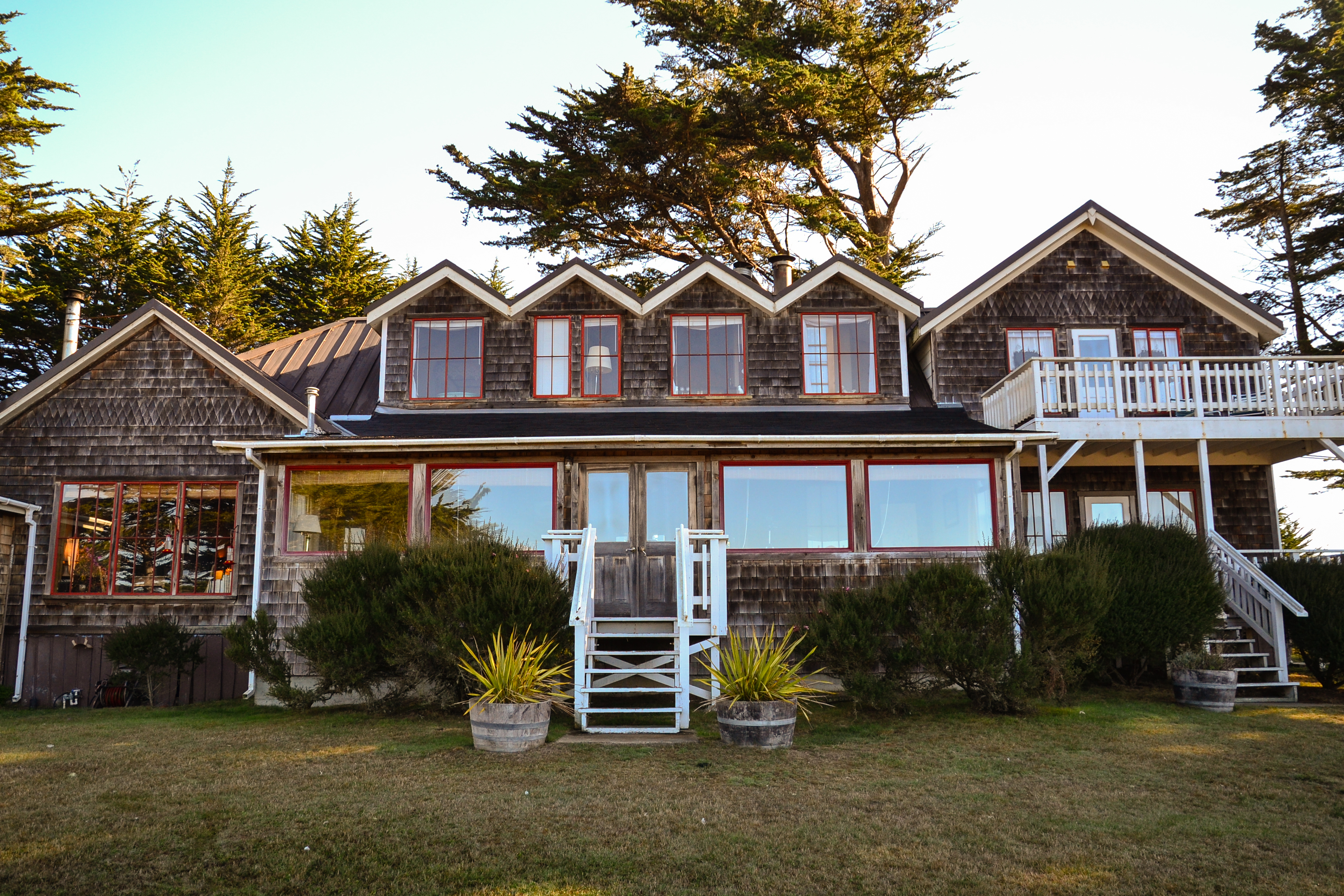

- Location within California

General information
- Location: Albion, California, United States, 33810 Navarro Ridge Road
- Coordinates: 39°12′16.04″N 123°45′42.22″W
- Operator: Evelyn Hamby

Other information
- Number of rooms: 8
- Number of restaurants: 1

Website
- Official website

The Fensalden Inn is a bed and breakfast located in Albion, California in the United States. The name, Fensalden, means "land of the sea and the mist."

== History ==
The Inn is a former Wells Fargo stagecoach stop from mid 19th-century. The buildings date back to the 1850s-1860s and consist of a former house and a former tavern. The building that is the former tavern still retains the bullet holes that were shot into the ceiling. One of the buildings, the Water Tower House, is called such because there is a water tank above it. Today's Fensalden Inn was founded in the 1960s. The Haunting of Hill House was filmed on site at the Fensalden Inn. As of 2010, the Inn was hosting regular murder mystery games for the paying public. Ghost hunters believe the Inn is haunted. The ghost is a prostitute named Elizabeth who is claimed to have worked at the Inn when it was a former stagecoach stop. Evelyn Hamby is the innkeeper.

== Facilities ==
The Inn has eight rooms and resides on 20 acres. The property over looks the ocean at 400 feet high. Each room has its own fireplace. There is a fence along the property to keep out deer. The architecture of the Inn has been compared to that of Bernard Maybeck and Julia Morgan. Many of the Inn's interior spaces are built of redwood trees. There is a parlor which also serves as a bar and breakfast is served in a dining room.
