= Albion River =

River in Mendocino County, California (USA)

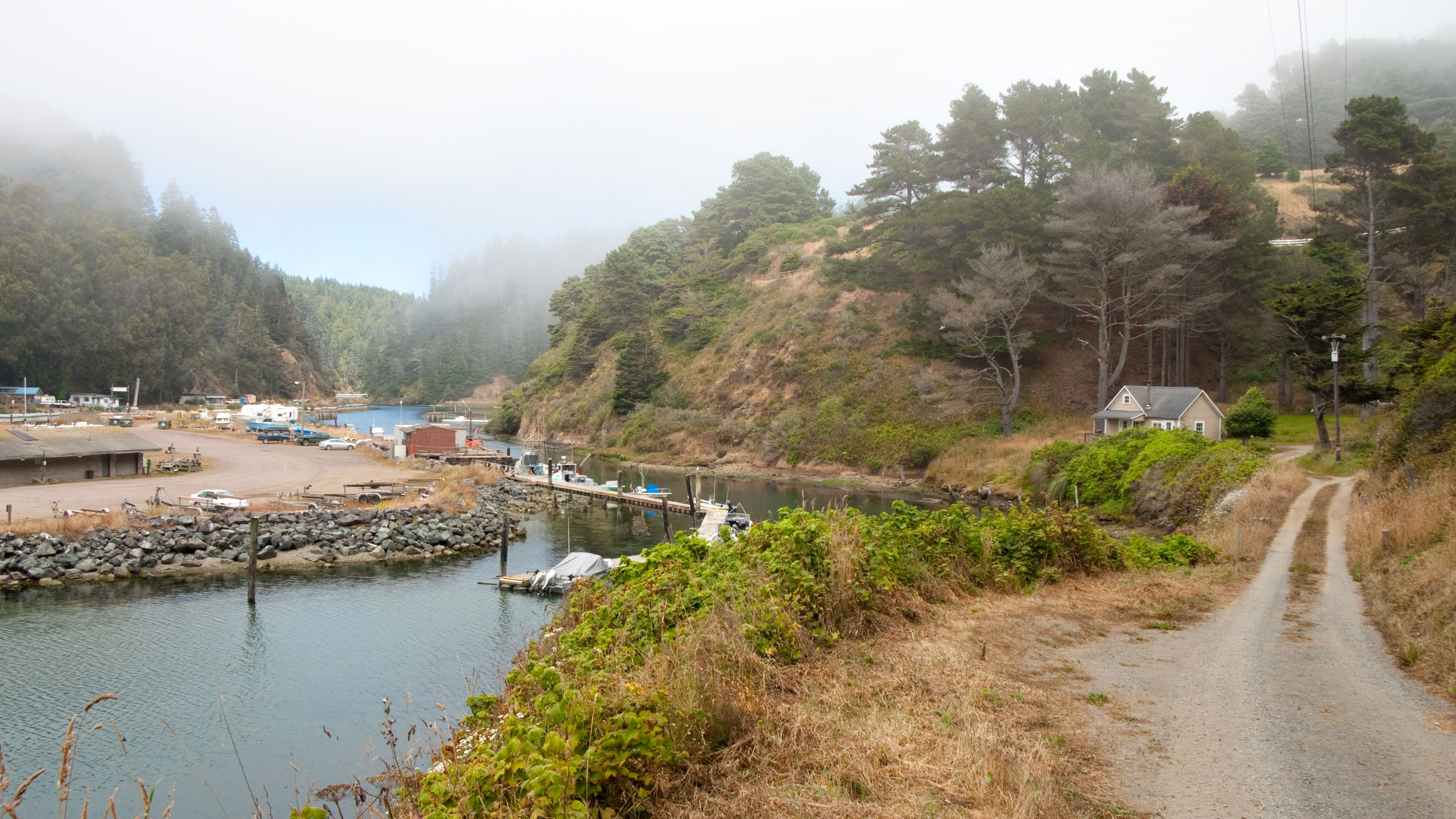
- Albion River

- Location of the mouth in California

Location
- Country: United States
- State: California
- Region: Mendocino County

Physical characteristics
- Source
  - location: 12 mi (19 km) southwest of Willits
  - coordinates: 39°15′10″N 123°32′32″W
  - elevation: 800 ft (240 m)
- Mouth: Pacific Ocean
  - location: Albion, California
  - coordinates: 39°13′38″N 123°46′13″W
  - elevation: 0 ft (0 m)
- Basin size: 43 sq mi (110 km^{2})

The Albion River is an 18.1-mile-long (29.1 km) river in Mendocino County, California. The river drains about 43 square miles (110 km^{2}) on the Mendocino Coast and empties into the Pacific Ocean near the town of Albion, California, where California State Route 1 crosses it on the Albion River Bridge. The river's overall direction is east to west, but it moves significantly in the north–south direction. The tributaries of the river include Railroad Gulch, Pleasant Valley Creek, Duck Pond Gulch, South Fork Albion River, Tom Bell Creek, North Fork Albion River, and Marsh Creek. The river's most inland point is only 15 miles (24 km) from the coast, and its highest elevation is about 1,570 feet (480 m) above sea level. There is a large estuary at the mouth of the river, and tidal waters travel up to 5 miles (8 km) upstream. The Albion River was previously used to power a sawmill on the river mouth, but there are no major dams or reservoirs on the river. The river provides recreation, groundwater recharge and industrial water supply for the community of Albion, and wildlife habitat including cold freshwater habitat for fish migration and spawning.

== History ==
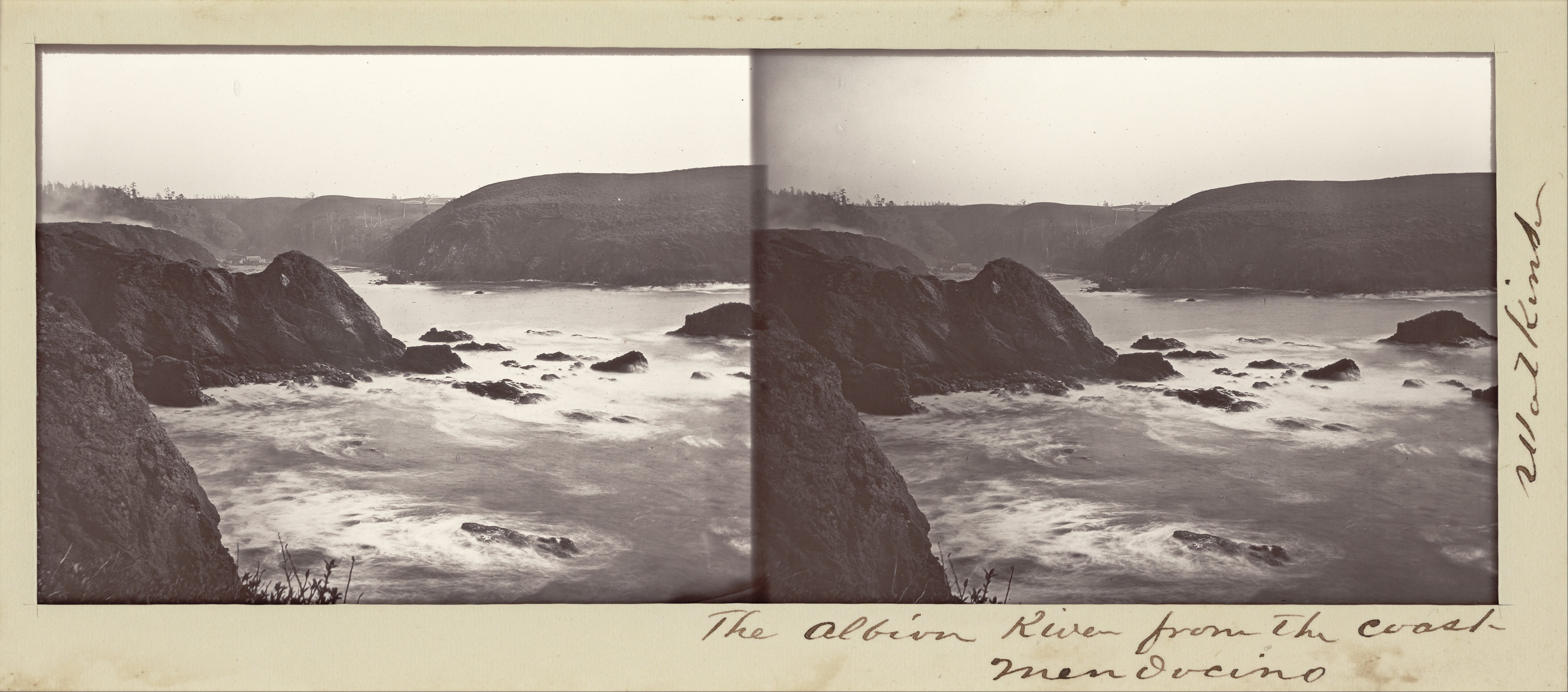
The Albion River from the Coast (1863)

The river is named for Albion, the ancient name for Britain. The name was originally applied to a land grant in 1884 by William A. Richardson, and the river inherited the name of the grant. Captain Richardson built a sawmill near the mouth of the river in 1853. The mill was converted to steam power in 1856 and burned in 1867. The mill was rebuilt to cut 35,000 board feet (83 m^{3}) of lumber per day. Construction of the Albion River Railroad began in 1885 to bring logs downstream to the sawmill. In 1891 the sawmill operators incorporated the Albion Lumber Company headquartered in San Francisco, where a planing mill and lumber drying facilities were constructed at the foot of 6th street. In 1892 Albion Lumber Company was purchased by Standish-Hickey of Michigan, who constructed a company town near the mouth of the river in 1895. A second sawmill was built at Brett, about three miles (5 km) upstream of the mouth, in 1903. By 1905, the railway extended up Railroad Gulch and over Keen's Summit into the Navarro River watershed. A railway branch line extended within 1 mile (2 km) of Comptche, California. The railroad became Atchison, Topeka and Santa Fe Railway subsidiary Fort Bragg and Southeastern Railroad in 1905, and Albion Lumber Company was purchased by Southern Pacific Transportation Company in 1907. Santa Fe and Southern Pacific merged the 24-mile (40 km) Fort Bragg and Southeastern Railroad into the Northwestern Pacific Railroad in 1907, but the railroad never actually connected to the Northwestern Pacific main line up the Russian River. Trains carried lumber to the mouth of the Albion River where it was loaded onto ships bound for San Francisco. The last log went through the Albion sawmill on 19 May 1928, and the railroad ceased operation on 16 January 1930. The railroad was dismantled for scrap in 1937.

Logging of the watershed has continued. Logging is the cause of the main environmental problem facing the river, excessive sedimentation. Only a small percentage of the land is second-growth forest and only a tiny amount is old-growth. Most of the land is third- and fourth-growth forest. Over half of the land in the watershed is owned by Mendocino Redwood Company. About a fifth is made up of parcels owned by other lumber companies. The rest is made up of a few ranches, numerous private residences and some public land.

In 2002, Alaska businessmen and former Reagan administration Interior Department official Ric Davidge announced plans to collect water from the Albion and Gualala rivers in large bags and tow it several hundred miles south to San Diego as drinking water. However, the plan drew local opposition, and was eventually shelved after the state government passed new laws requiring extensive studies of the effects on fish habitats before any such plan could proceed. The governor later signed a law declaring the two rivers as recreational areas, preventing similar attempts at exploiting their resources.

== Railway mileposts ==
- Milepost 0 - Albion wharf
- Milepost 3.25 - Brett
- Milepost 7.32 - Clearbrook Junction with the branch that runs 1 mile (1.6 km) up the main river
- Milepost 8.30 - Gunari
- Milepost 12.37 - Sunny Slope
- Milepost 13.05 - Skibo
- Milepost 14.65 - switchback
- Milepost 15.44 - Keene summit crossed into Navarro River drainage at elevation 611 feet (186 m)

== See also ==
- List of rivers in California
