= Albion Field Station =

- Established: 1947
- Research type: Research; Education
- Budget: $100,000
- Field of research: Biology; Environmental science
- Location: 34000 Albion Street, Albion, California, 95410, United States; 39°13′36″N 123°45′45″W
- Affiliations: Adventist Church
- Operating agency: Pacific Union College
- Website: Albion Field Station

The Albion Biological Field Station is a research and education facility near the Pacific coast of Mendocino County, California that is operated by Pacific Union College, a private liberal arts college affiliated with the Adventist Church and located in the Napa Valley.

== Background ==
The Albion Field Station is located in Albion, California, on the south bank of the Albion River, in a former lumber camp. It was established in 1947, and provides college courses in biology as well as shorter courses for elementary and high school students and seniors. It also provides boating facilities, which were significantly renovated beginning in 2007.

In 2007, the net cost to the college of operating the station was $100,000.
