= Hendy Woods State Park =

Park in Mendocino County, California

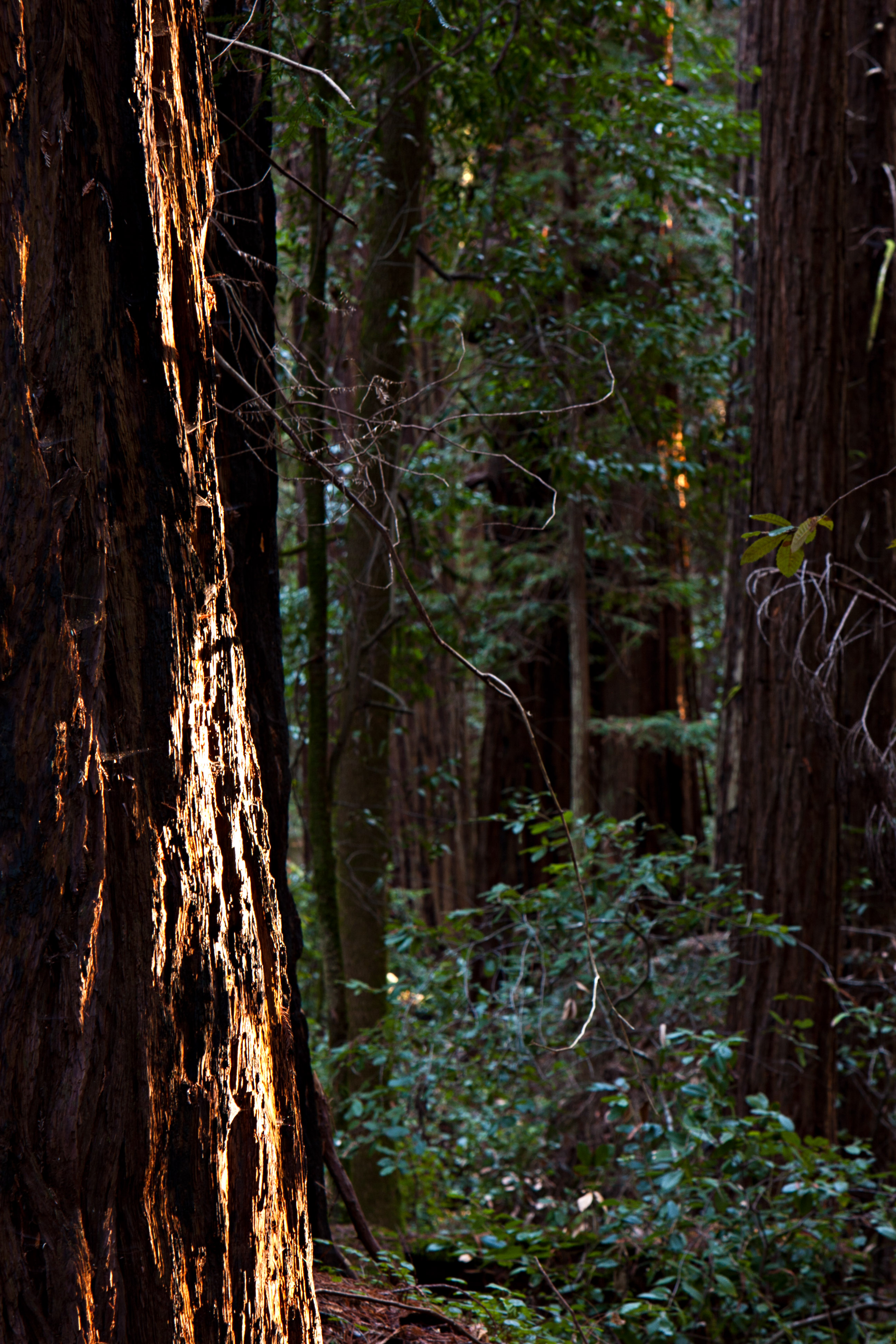
- Old-growth redwoods in Hendy Woods

- Location within California Location within the United States
- Location: Mendocino County, California, United States
- Nearest city: Philo, California
- Coordinates: 39°4′N 123°28′W
- Area: 816 acres (330 ha)
- Established: 1958
- Governing body: California Department of Parks and Recreation

Hendy Woods State Park is a California state park, located in the Anderson Valley of Mendocino County. It is known for its old-growth coast redwoods and also provides camping facilities near the wineries of the Anderson Valley. It is named after Joshua Hendy, who owned the land and stipulated that it be protected; it passed through several owners after Hendy without being logged, before becoming part of the California State Park system in 1958.

== Description and facilities ==
Hendy Woods State Park lies in the Anderson Valley of Mendocino County, approximately a three-hour drive north of San Francisco; it is the only large park within the Anderson Valley. It is about 20 miles from the coast, and because of the distance, it is noticeably warmer than California's coast redwood forests on the coast. The park can be reached via the Philo–Greenwood Road, just off California State Route 128.

The park covers 816 acres (3.30 km^{2}) of land and contains two groves of old-growth coast redwood: Big Hendy (80 acres) and Little Hendy (20 acres). Some of the trees are over 300 feet (91 m) tall and may be nearly 1,000 years old. Other trees in the woods include madrone, Douglas fir, and California laurel. The park also contains 3.3 miles of property along the banks of the Navarro River and provides the only public access to the river within the Anderson Valley.

The park's facilities include several miles of hiking trails, including a wheelchair-accessible trail through the redwoods. There are 25 picnic sites along the Navarro river banks, two campgrounds between the two redwood groves totaling 92 campsites, and four cabins. No fishing is allowed within the park, but catch-and-release fishing is possible from the one-lane "Prune Belly Bridge" on the Philo–Greenwood road near the park entrance, and the park is also a popular location for swimming and boating on the river. Visitors to the park campgrounds can also go wine tasting in the many nearby wineries of the Anderson Valley AVA. The park is one of only two in Mendocino County to fully comply with the Americans with Disabilities Act.

== History ==
The Pomo people lived in what is now Hendy Woods for thousands of years, supporting themselves as hunter-gatherers. The first western settlers in the region were Russian fur traders who claimed the Pomo lands and forced the Pomo people into servitude; today, the remaining Pomo people are greatly reduced in number.

Joshua Hendy, after whom Hendy Woods was named, was an English-born blacksmith who moved from Texas to California in the California Gold Rush and built a large sawmill on the Navarro River. When Hendy died in 1891, he willed the property to his nephews with a stipulation that the coast redwood groves in it be protected. However, his nephew Samuel Hendy eventually ran out of money and sold the property to the Pacific Coast Lumber Company. It was sold again in turn to the Albion Lumber Company, in 1930 to the Southern Pacific Land Company, and in 1948 to the Masonite Corporation, together with the land stretching from what is now the park to the coast. Masonite built a fiberboard mill in Ukiah and sparked a renewal of the logging boom in the area.

Through these changes of ownership, Hendy Woods remained unlogged and was a popular location for family picnics. In 1938, Al Strowbridge visited the Anderson Valley Unity Club (a local women's service organization) and spoke to them about the redwood forests of California; from that time forward the Unity Club worked to save the remaining groves of redwoods, and in 1958 the California State Park system bought approximately 600 acres of land with two miles of river frontage from Masonite for US$350,000. The park was formally dedicated on July 7, 1963; the dedication was attended by state senator Frank S. Petersen, musician Ethel Waters, and various local dignitaries. From 1979 to 1988, several additional purchases brought the park up to its present size of 816 acres. Additionally, the Unity Club continued to help maintain the park, building a disabled-accessible trail through the redwoods in 1980–1981 as part of the International Year of Disabled Persons.

The park was home to the "Hendy Hermit" Petrov Zailenko, who lived there for over a decade in the 1960s and 1970s, hunting local game and taking produce from local farms. The Hermit Hut Trail in the park passes one of the huts that Zailenko built from fallen redwood debris. Zailenko died in 1981, and his ashes were scattered in the park.

Despite accommodating nearly 50,000 visitors per year (primarily from the San Francisco Bay Area) and bringing in an estimated revenue of US$2.8 million per year to Mendocino County, Hendy Woods was one of 70 state parks slated for closure in July 2012 due to state budget cuts. With an annual operating budget of $468,000, and fees totalling $239,000 per year, the state would have saved approximately $229,000 per year by the closure, but this calculation did not include the tax revenues from the economic activities surrounding the park, which have been estimated to be significantly higher than the cost of running the park. In November 2011, a group of protesters associated with the Occupy movement camped in the park (despite the campground being closed for the winter) in protest of the cuts. In part because of local fundraising efforts for many of the parks, the planned closure ultimately did not happen.

== See also ==
- List of California state parks
