= La MICA Biological Station =

Panamaian field station

La MICA Biological Station was a biological field station near Parque Nacional General de División Omar Torrijos Herrera in El Copé, Coclé Province, Republic of Panama. La MICA was established in 2007 by Julie M. Ray, a Ph.D. student from Old Dominion University studying Panamanian snakes.
