= Navarro River =

River in California, United States of America

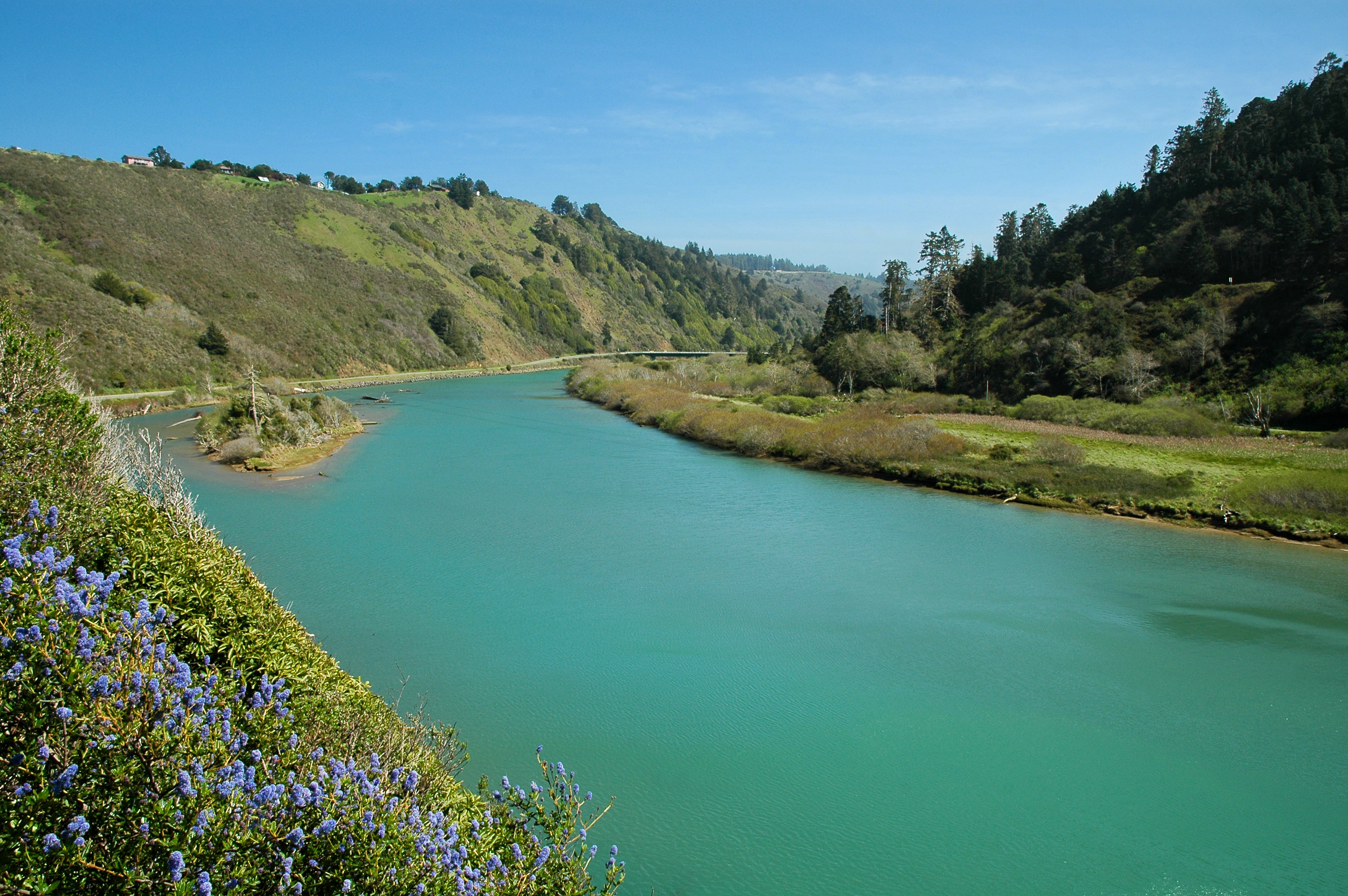
- The Navarro River near its mouth

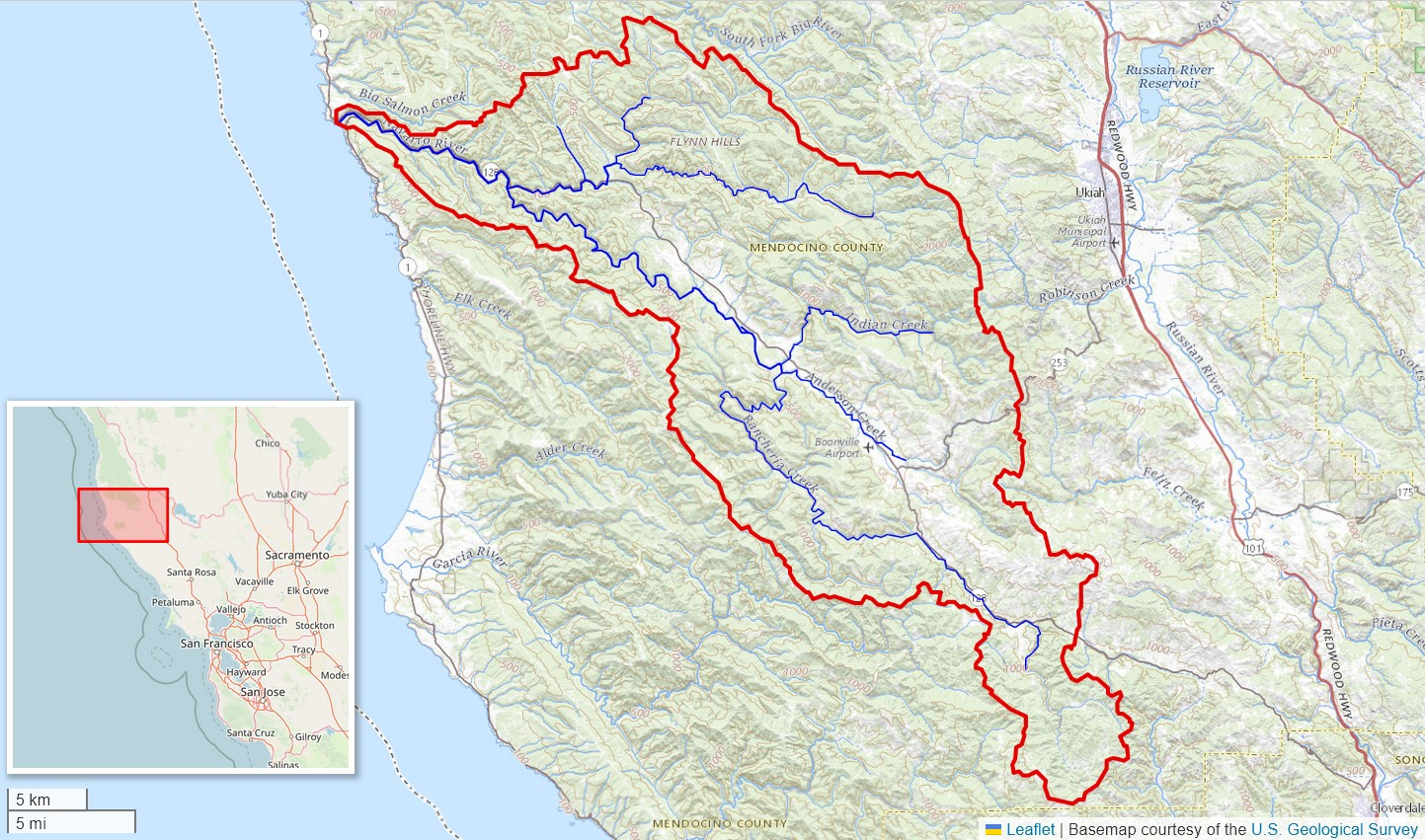
- Navarro River watershed (Interactive map)
- Native name: Spanish: Río Navarro

Location
- Country: United States
- State: California
- Region: Mendocino County

Physical characteristics
- Source: Rancheria Creek, Mendocino County
  - location: Crystal Peak
  - coordinates: 38°50′25″N 123°11′36″W
- 2nd source: Anderson Creek
  - location: Sanel Mountain
  - coordinates: 38°56′45″N 123°16′10″W
- 3rd source: confluence
  - location: 1 mi (2 km) south of Philo, California
  - coordinates: 39°3′12″N 123°26′25″W
- Mouth: Pacific Ocean
  - location: 8 mi (13 km) south of Mendocino, California
  - coordinates: 39°11′32″N 123°45′40″W
  - elevation: 0 ft (0 m)
- Basin size: 315 sq mi (820 km^{2})
- Discharge
  - location: Navarro, California
  - average: 500 cu ft/s (14 m^{3}/s)
  - minimum: 0.23 cu ft/s (0.0065 m^{3}/s)
  - maximum: 64,500 cu ft/s (1,830 m^{3}/s)

The Navarro River is a 28.3-mile-long (45.5 km) river in Mendocino County, California, United States. It flows northwest through the Coastal Range to the Pacific Ocean. The main stem of the Navarro River begins less than 1 mile (2 km) south of the town of Philo at the confluence of Rancheria Creek and Anderson Creek. The mouth of the Navarro is 10 miles (16 km) south of the city of Mendocino. State Route 128 starts from the intersection of State Route 1 at the mouth of the Navarro River, and follows the river valley upstream to Philo. The river is close to the highway through the lower canyon but is some distance south of the highway as the Anderson Valley widens upstream of Wendling.

== Water use ==
The river provides wildlife habitat including cold freshwater habitat for fish migration and spawning. It also provides recreation and navigation including 26 miles (42 km) of whitewater suitable for rafting and kayaking upstream of Rancheria Creek. Near Philo the river runs through Hendy Woods State Park, a state park of more than 800 acres (320 ha), featuring two virgin redwood stands. Near the coast the river runs through Navarro River Redwoods State Park. The river recharges groundwater for agricultural and industrial water supply for residents living along the western portion of California State Route 128. Its 315 square miles (820 km^{2}) watershed includes the Anderson Valley, a well-known wine-growing region in Mendocino County.

== History ==
Prior to colonial contact, the Navarro River watershed fed water sources for Northern California Native communities, including the Pomo people, who relied on salmon and riparian vegetation for cultural and subsistence practices. In 1848–1850, the California Gold Rush brought non-native settlers to the valley who forced the Pomo people up the Eel River northward to Round Valley Reservation, in an approximately 40 mile forced march known as Bloody Run, so called because the river ran red with blood.

A sawmill was constructed at the mouth of the river in 1861. The mill was capable of cutting 35,000 board feet (83 m^{3}) of lumber per day by 1883. A railroad extended 14 miles (23 km) upriver to bring logs to the mill. The original mill burned in 1890 and a replacement bandsaw mill burned in 1902. A replacement sawmill was built near Wendling on the North Fork Navarro River and operated until September, 1927. The Wendling sawmill operation included logging railway branches along the North Fork connecting over Keen's Summit to shipping facilities at Albion via an isolated segment of the Northwestern Pacific Railroad. Rail service was discontinued in 1930 and the railway was dismantled for scrap in 1937.

== See also ==
- List of rivers in California
