= Navarro, California =

Unincorporated community in California, United States

Navarro
- Unincorporated community
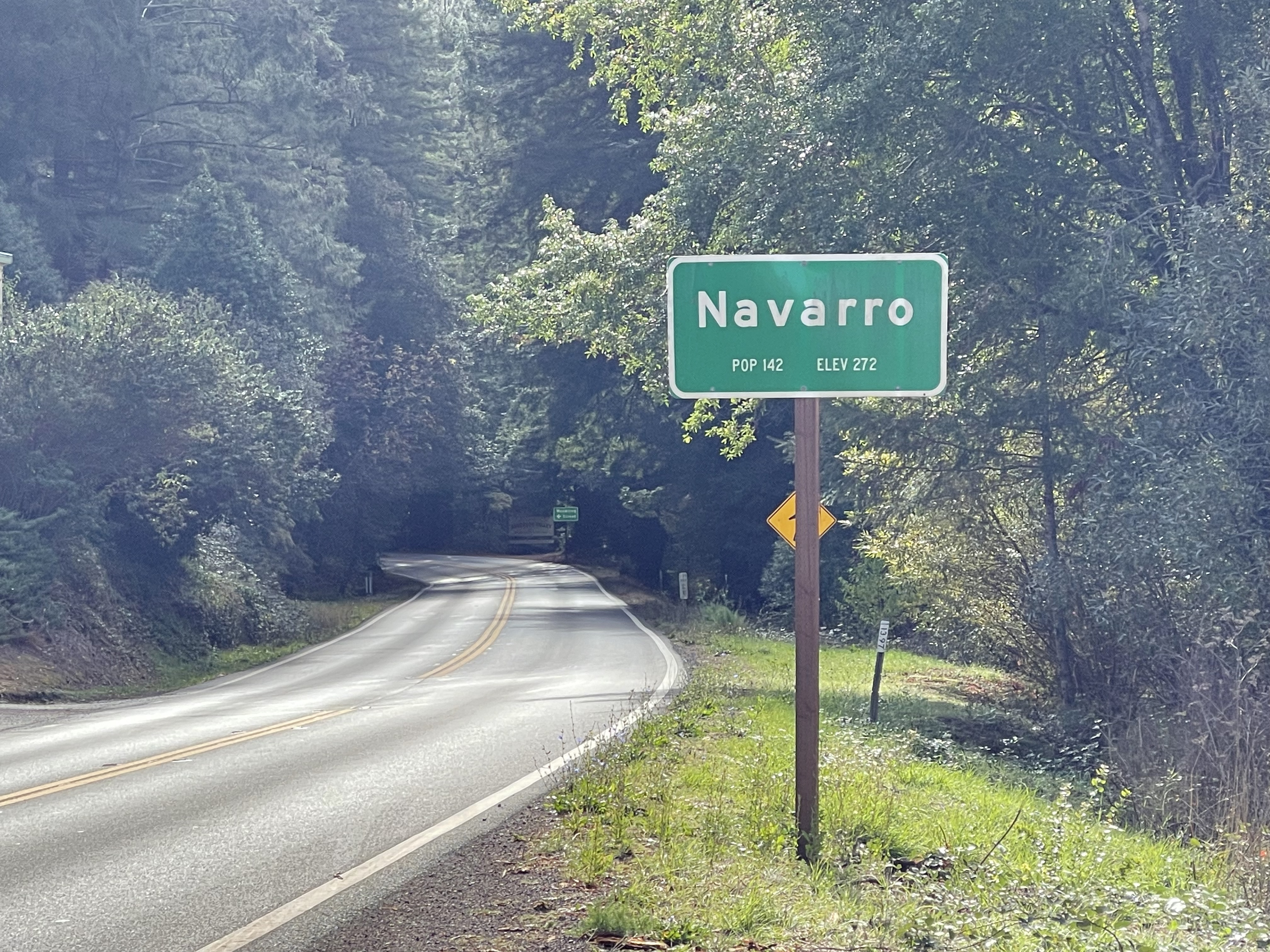
- Navarro, California

- Location in California Navarro (the United States)
- Coordinates: 39°09′07″N 123°32′31″W
- Country: United States
- State: California
- County: Mendocino
- Elevation: 269 ft (82 m)
- ZIP code: 95463

Navarro (formerly known as Wendling) is an unincorporated community in Mendocino County in the U.S. state of California. It is located 18 miles (29 km) west of Ukiah, at an elevation of 269 feet (82 m). It may be reached via the east–west California State Route 128, which connects it to the Pacific coast to the west and to the Anderson Valley to the southeast.

== History ==
A former town named Navarro, with approximately 1,000 people, was founded in the 1860s and located approximately 14 miles (23 km) to the west of the present town, at the mouth of the Navarro River in what is now Navarro River Redwoods State Park. A post office opened there in 1867. In 1902, the mill at the mouth of the river burned down, and the post office closed. A new mill was built that year by G. C. Wendling on the north fork of the Navarro River, at the present location of Navarro, and in 1905 the town of Wendling was founded around the mill. A post office was opened there in 1914. However, in 1916, the Wendling mill was bought by the Navarro Lumber Company, at which point Wendling became known as Navarro Mill, or, more simply, Navarro. To reduce confusion, the dwindling seaside town of Navarro became known as Old Navarro, Navarro Ridge, or Navarro-by-the-sea.

The Fort Bragg and Southeastern Railroad connected Wendling (Navarro) with seaport facilities in Albion from 1905 to 1930.
