= Elk, Mendocino County, California =

Unincorporated community in California, United States

Elk
- Unincorporated community
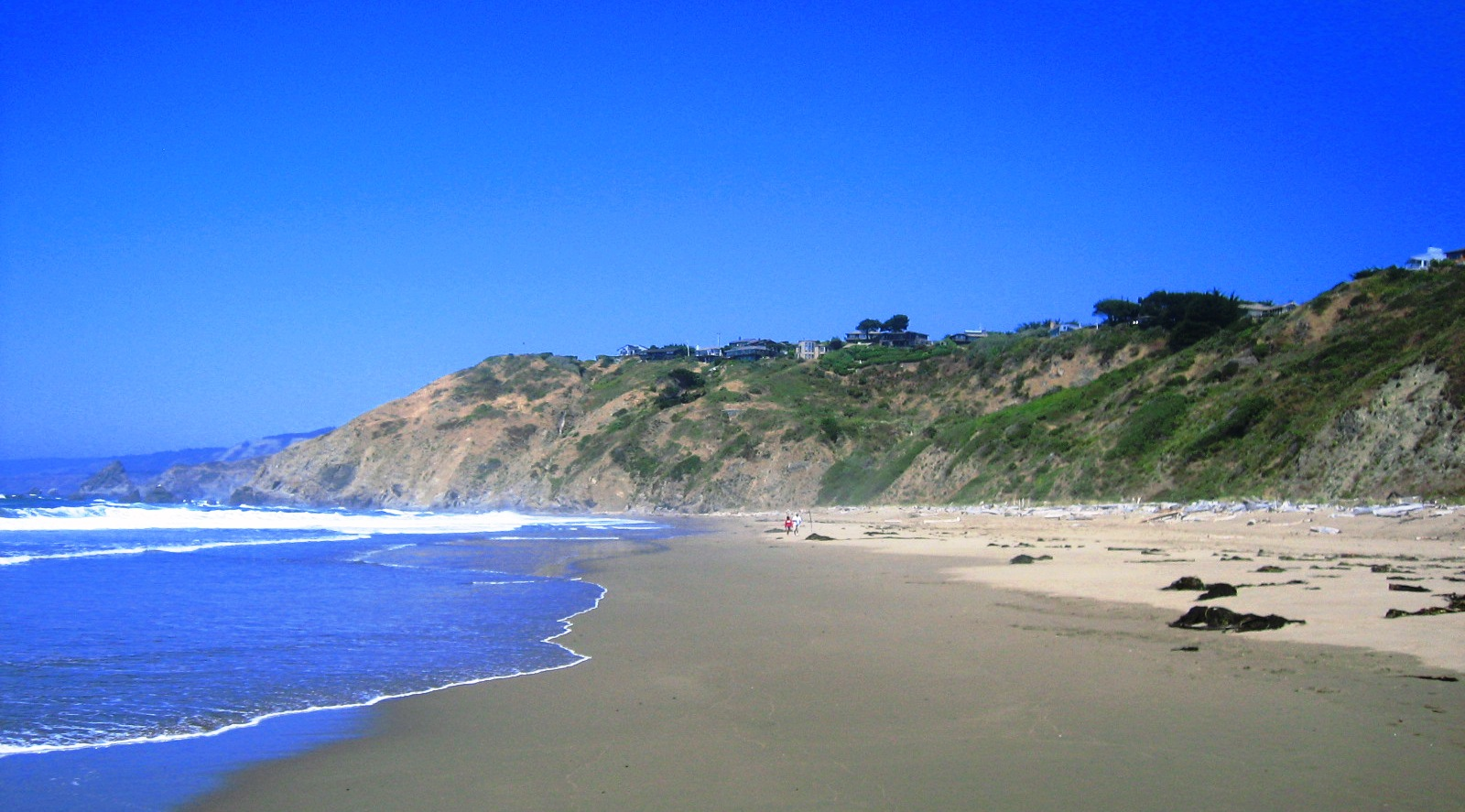
- Beach in Elk

- Location in California Elk (the United States)
- Coordinates: 39°07′49″N 123°43′04″W
- Country: United States
- State: California
- County: Mendocino County
- Elevation: 135 ft (41 m)
- ZIP code: 95432
- Area code: 707
- FIPS code: 06-21992
- GNIS feature ID: 1655992

Elk (formerly Sadie Gravlee and Elk River) is an unincorporated community in Mendocino County, California.

== Geography ==
The community is located 22 miles (35 km) south of Fort Bragg, at an elevation of 135 feet (41 m).

Elk has a population of 208. It is located on the coast at the crossroads of State Route 1 and Philo-Greenwood Road. Albion, Little River, and Mendocino lie to the north, and Manchester and Point Arena to the south. Inland are Navarro, Philo, and Boonville.

== History ==
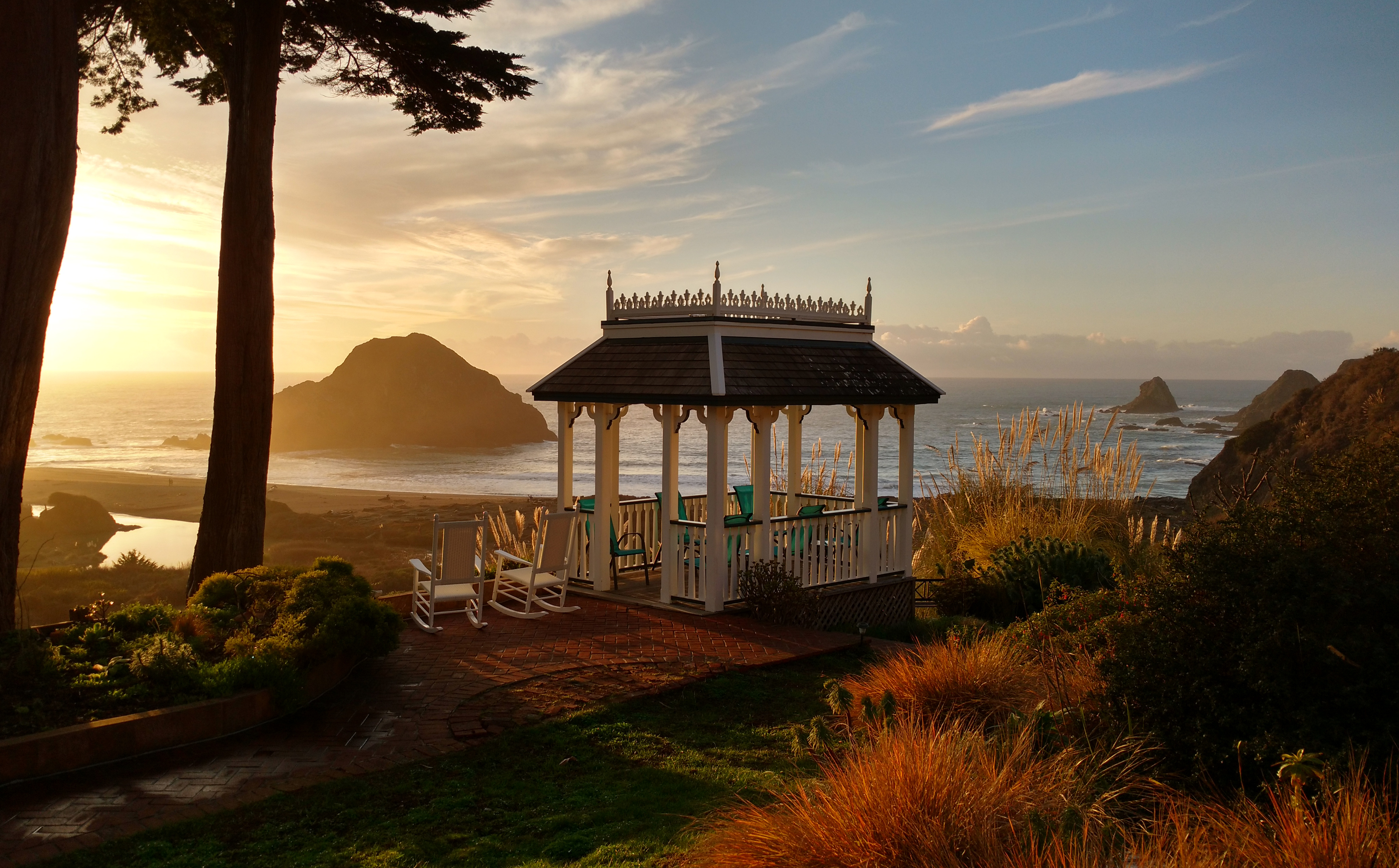
Sunset in Elk

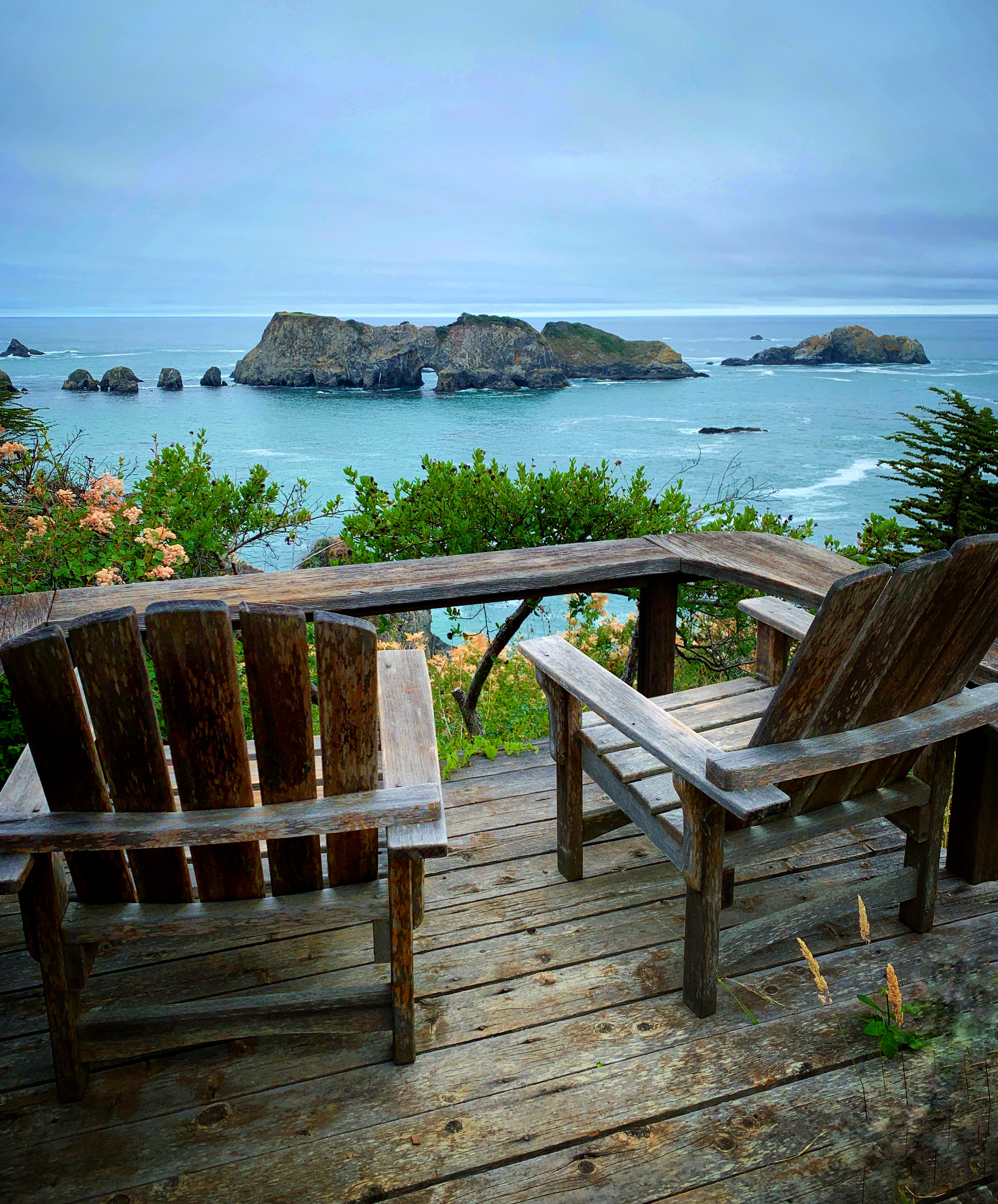
View of the ocean and the rock formations from Elk

Elk was originally called "Greenwood," after the Greenwood brothers, early homesteaders and sons of mountain man Caleb Greenwood and his half-Crow wife, one of the rescuers of the Donner Party. When the post office was opened, in 1887, there was already another Greenwood in California so it was called Elk Post Office. Eventually the name came to refer to the town. It is an outgrowth of an earlier town called Cuffy's Cove and the cemetery is located at that townsite 1 mile (2 km) north of Elk. When pioneer lumberman Lorenzo White was unable to reach a satisfactory deal with the owners of the lumber chutes at Cuffy's Cove to ship out his redwood product, he constructed a wharf out along a string of rocks in the center of what is now Elk. When he built a large steam sawmill and 3-foot (90 cm) gauge railroad, the new employment drained the town of Cuffy's Cove, which was eventually abandoned. The sawmill was producing 80,000 board feet (200 m^{3}) of lumber per day by 1890. The mill was sold to Goodyear Redwood Company in 1916. Elk River Company took over the sawmill when Goodyear went bankrupt in 1932. The local redwood lumber industry economy collapsed when the uninsured sawmill burned in 1936.

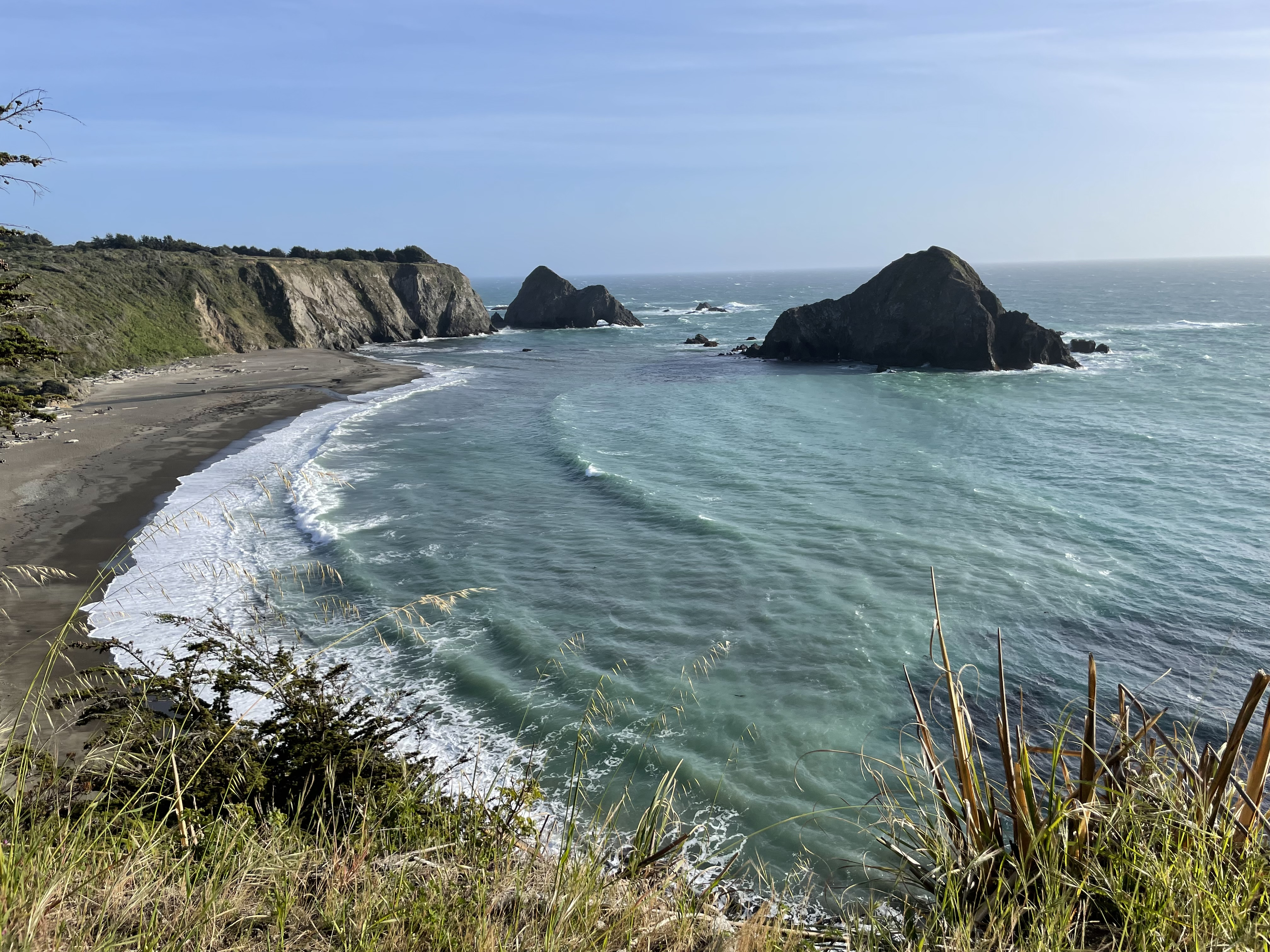
Greenwood - Elk Beach, Mendocino County, California

A new sawmill was built c. 1953 and another followed in 1963. These operated until the late 1960s, when the redwood and Douglas fir was mostly logged out (which means that the ancient trees big enough to be thought of as more valuable dead than alive had been killed). After some quiet times, the town has had a rebirth as a recreation destination, particularly as a result of the pandemic, with people wanting to get out of the urban areas. Despite its small size, the town has some art galleries and fine-dining restaurants, one of which was a 2025 James Beard Foundation Award finalist. A couple of the larger old houses are now bed and breakfast inns, and the state has acquired Greenwood State Beach and the original mill site as a state park. The ZIP Code is 95432. The community is inside area code 707.

=== Elk Logging Railway locomotives ===
Number	Builder	Type	Date	Works number	Notes
	Baldwin Locomotive Works	4-4-0	1873	3495	originally North Pacific Coast Railroad #1; purchased 1876; scrapped 1903
1	Lima Locomotive Works	Shay geared	9 May 1903	800	built for L.E.White Lumber Company
2	Lima Locomotive Works	Shay geared	8 December 1904	957	built for L.E.White Lumber Company
3					
4	Lima Locomotive Works	Shay geared	27 October 1917	2942	built for Goodyear Redwood Company

== Government ==
In the California State Legislature, Elk is in the 2nd senatorial district, represented by Democrat Mike McGuire, and in the 2nd Assembly district, represented by Democrat Chris Rogers.

In the United States House of Representatives, Elk is in California's 2nd congressional district, represented by Democrat Jared Huffman.
