= Caleb Greenwood =

American trapper and guide (c. 1763 – c. 1850)

- Born: 1763; Virginia
- Died: 1850 (aged 86–87)
- Occupations: Fur trapper and trail guide

Caleb Greenwood (c. 1763 – c. 1850) was a Western U.S. fur trapper and trail guide.

== Early years ==
Born in Virginia, Greenwood took part in trapping expeditions organized by associates of John Jacob Astor in 1810 and by Manuel Lisa in 1812–1813. In 1815 he trapped independently on the Arkansas River, and later traveled up the Missouri River in the company of other trappers.

In 1824 trappers led by John Henry Weber, including Greenwood and Jim Bridger, crossed South Pass to trap on the eastern slope of the Wind River Mountains. Weber's party went to what is today Soda Springs, Idaho, and proceeded to a tributary of the Bear River to establish a winter camp. On May 23, 1825, Weber's party joined with a group led by Jedediah Smith in a confrontation with Hudson's Bay Company trappers led by Peter Skene Ogden. In July 1825, Greenwood joined the large group of trappers and traders at William H. Ashley's first great rendezvous on the Green River.

== Family life ==
In the 1820s, Greenwood married Batchicka Youngcau, who was half French and half Crow Indian according to family records. The couple had seven children: John (1827 or 1828), Britton Bailey (between 1827 and 1830), Governor Boggs (between 1834 and 1836), William Sublette (1838), James Case (1841), Angeline (dob unknown), and Sarah Mojave (1843). After 1834, he and a growing family lived for a time on a small farm in northern Missouri. After his wife's death in 1843, he again turned to the west. He died in California either in 1849 or 1850. A history of California published by Theodore Henry Hittell in 1898 reports on a conflict between Indians and white settlers, including Greenwood's family, in Coloma, California. This account identifies an additional Greenwood son, David Crockett Greenwood. (Hittell, p. 890)

Greenwood employed his sons on the trail, guiding Americans westward to California, often under the employ of Charles Sutter of Sutter's Mill. While shepherding dissenters of the Barlow Train in 1845, Greenwood ordered the execution of his eldest son John for the murder of a Native man. However, no execution was ever undertaken, as John fled the train and arrived in California independently of the other Greenwoods.

== Sublette-Greenwood cutoff ==
In 1844 Greenwood, along with Isaac Hitchcock, guided the influential Stephens–Townsend–Murphy Party across the Sierra Nevada mountain range. On reaching Sutter's Fort he had completed one of the first overland wagon journeys to California.

Returning east the following year with his two sons, Greenwood pioneered a new route bypassing the Truckee River Canyon, named in honor of the chief of the Pah Utes who guided the men to this route. This subsequently became a main route of the California Trail, which hundreds of thousands of people followed in the California Gold Rush of 1849. While guiding the Stephens–Townsend–Murphy party along the Emigrant Trail in Wyoming, Greenwood suggested instead of following the original trail south to Fort Bridger, the party leave the main trail near the Little Sandy River and head west across the Wyoming high desert to rejoin the main trail in the Bear River valley. The new route cut 85 miles (137 km) and 7 days off the trip, but it was risky as nearly 45 miles (72 km) of the new route were without water. The trail gained popularity after it was detailed in a popular guide book published by Joseph Ware in 1849. Ware mistakenly called it the Sublette Cutoff after Solomon Sublette, who had described the trail to him. The route reached the height of its popularity during the California Gold Rush, when the need for speed outweighed risk. Greenwood may have pioneered the Gold Trail and its two main variants, the Coldstream Route and the Dog Valley–Adler Creek Route. Over the course of the Gold Rush, approximately 50% of all overland travelers followed the Greenwood paths.

Historians now refer to the route as the Sublette-Greenwood Cutoff in honor of Greenwood.

== Other eponyms ==
- Caleb Greenwood K–8 School in the Sacramento City Unified School District is named after Greenwood; it opened in 1950.
- Elk, Mendocino County, California, was formerly called Greenwood after two of Caleb Greenwood's sons who settled there.
- Greenwood, California is on State 193 Highway in northern El Dorado County near the towns of Cool and Georgetown. The Greenwood in Mendocino County had to be changed to Elk because the one in El Dorado was already in existence. The Mendocino County town was named after Caleb's son Britton who ranched there for a time. The El Dorado County town was named after Caleb and family who lived there. A pamphlet published by local genealogist Leonard M. Davis relates that son John Greenwood opened a trading post in Long Valley in 1848–49. The pamphlet reports that by the time the Greenwoods left in 1850, the town had replaced the name Long Valley with the Greenwood name.
