= Navarro River Redwoods State Park =

State park in Mendocino County, California

Coordinates: 39°10′30″N 123°40′34″W

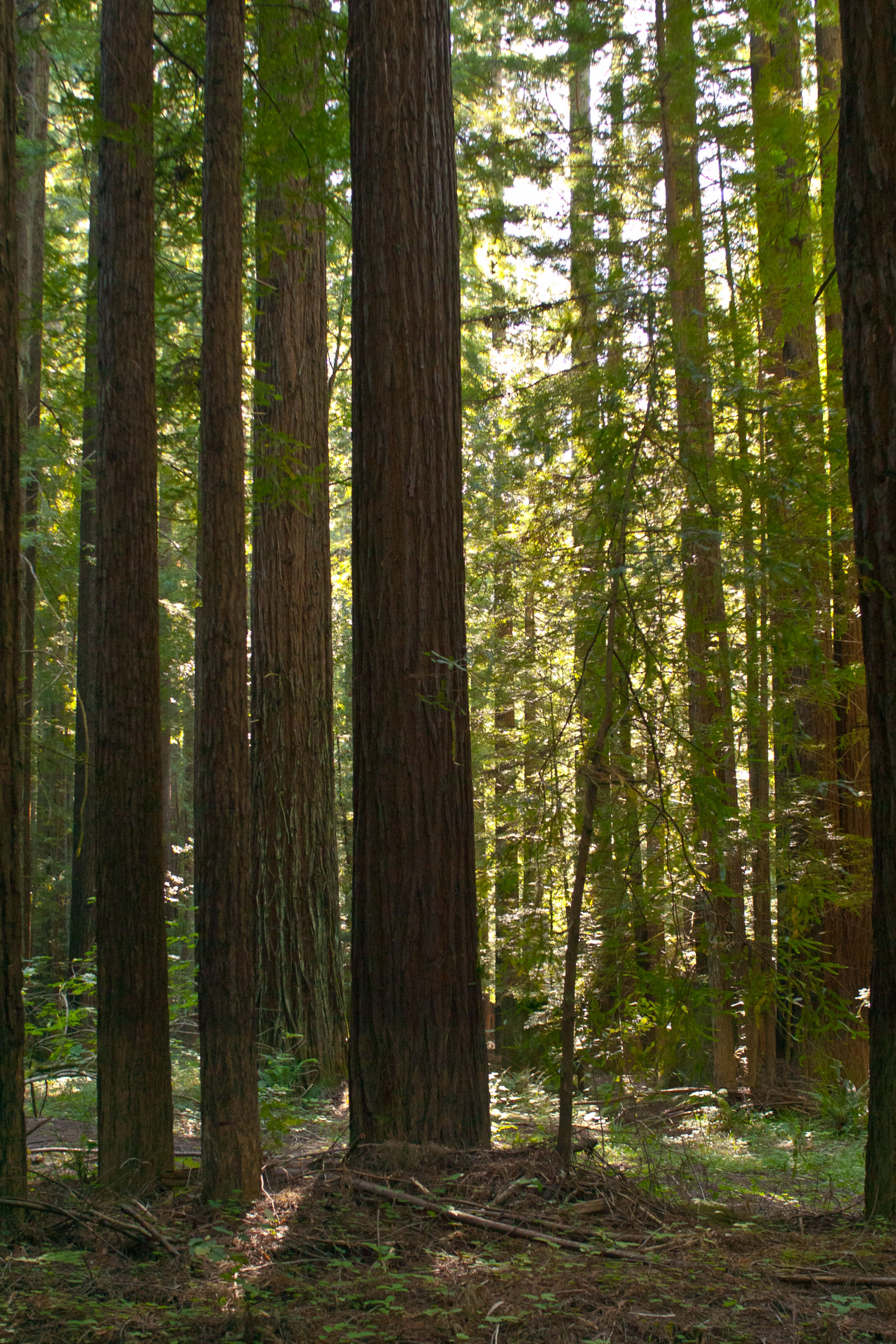
Redwood trees in Navarro River Redwoods State Park

Navarro River Redwoods State Park is a state park in Mendocino County, California, consisting of 660 acres (2.7 km^{2}) of second-growth redwood forest in a narrow stretch 11 miles (18 km) long on both banks of the Navarro River, from the town of Navarro to the river's confluence with the Pacific Ocean.

== Activities and facilities ==
The park may be reached via State Route 128, which winds through the park along the north bank of the river and has many turnouts, allowing travelers to stop for day use activities such as picnics and short walks through the forest. Fishing, swimming, kayaking, and canoeing are also possible.

Two developed campgrounds are part of the park. The Navarro Beach Campground is on the beach to the south of the river mouth; it has ten campsites, picnic tables, fire grills, and pit toilets, but no shade or drinking water. The Paul M. Dimmick Campground is inland, in a second-growth redwood grove near the river; it has 25 campsites, picnic tables, fire grills, pit toilets, and drinking water, but it may be flooded in the winter.

== Fauna and flora ==
The river supports coho salmon, steelhead trout, and river otters; great blue herons, kingfishers, loons, and osprey nest along its banks. Raccoons and black-tailed deer live in the forest, and gray whales and harbor seals may sometimes be seen from the beach on the Pacific Ocean at the mouth of the river.

Because the region now covered by the park was heavily logged in the 19th century, only second-growth redwood trees remain. However, two groves of old-growth redwoods may be seen in nearby Hendy Woods State Park, upriver a few miles southeast on Route 128.

== History ==
The park land near the Navarro beach includes several historic buildings. Captain Fletcher's Inn was built by Charles Fletcher, a Scottish sailor who came to the area in 1851 and was the first European settler on the Navarro estuary. In 1860, Fletcher sold most of his land to Henry Tichenor and Robert G. Byxbee, who built a lumber mill on it in 1861. Fletcher then built his inn in 1865 to house sailors in the lumber trade while they waited for their ships to load. In time, a town of 1,000 people sprang up around the mill, called Navarro. A train on the north bank of the river brought logs to the mouth of the river, where they were brought across to the mill on the south bank. The mill closed in 1893, and the 1906 San Francisco earthquake and several fires reduced the town to almost nothing by 1921; in 1922, the road that would become Highway 128 was built, re-using portions of the train bed. The inn remained open until the 1970s; the Navarro Mill Company House, and the Mill Superintendent's House (now home to the Navarro-by-the-Sea Center, a nonprofit group that maintains the buildings) also remain.

The town at the mouth of the Navarro River was not the only town in the area called Navarro. After the mill at the mouth of the Navarro burned down in 1902, G.C. Wendling built a new mill on the North Fork of the Navarro River, near the inland tip of what is now the park. In 1905, the town of Wendling was founded around the mill. In 1914, the Wendling Mill was purchased by the Navarro Lumber Company, at which point the town of Wendling also became known as Navarro Mill and eventually Navarro. In order to distinguish it from the inland Navarro, the town at the beach became known as Old Navarro, Navarro Ridge, or Navarro-by-the-sea.

In 1970, the beach and Fletcher's Inn (by then known as the Navarro-by-the-Sea Hotel) came to the attention of the California Supreme Court in the law case Dietz v. King, also known as Gion–Dietz because it was decided together with another case, Gion v. City of Santa Cruz. Starting in around 1949, the owners of the hotel had posted a 50 cent toll on the dirt access road to the beach, although beachgoers had not always paid the charge. The King family bought land including the beach and the road in 1959, and blocked public access to the beach; the Dietzes, representing the public, sued in 1966. The Supreme Court considered the hundred-year-long history of free public access to the beach (interrupted only during World War II, when the U.S. Coast Guard used it as a base for their patrols) and ruled that the access road was a public right-of-way.

The Paul M. Dimmick State Park, a 12 acres (0.049 km^{2}) site now part of Navarro River Redwoods, was established in 1928; it was named after a former superintendent at the Albion Lumber Company. The surrounding land of Navarro River Redwoods State Park was purchased on behalf of the California state park system by the Save the Redwoods League in 1987. The parks department also bought the Fletcher Inn in 1996 for $300,000, and in 1998 the National Trust for Historic Preservation listed it as one of their "Save America's Treasures" projects.
