= Albion, California =

Albion
- Unincorporated community Census-designated place
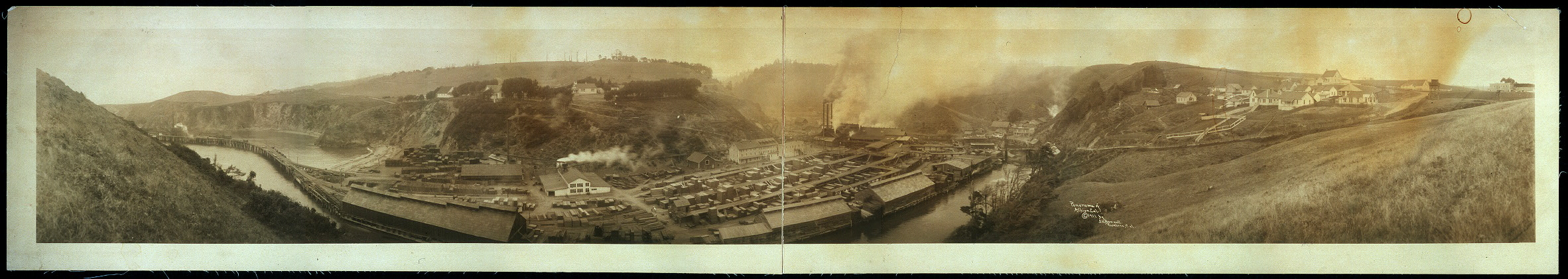
- Albion in 1911

- Location within California Location within the United States
- Coordinates: 39°13′25″N 123°46′07″W
- Country: United States
- State: California
- County: Mendocino

Area
  - Total: 1.85 sq mi (4.8 km^{2})
  - Land: 1.81 sq mi (4.7 km^{2})
  - Water: 0.04 sq mi (0.10 km^{2}) 2.02%
- Elevation: 174 ft (53 m)

Population (2020)
  - Total: 153
  - Density: 84.3/sq mi (32.5/km^{2})
- Time zone: UTC-8 (Pacific (PST))
  - Summer (DST): UTC-7 (PDT)
- ZIP Code: 95410
- Area code: 707
- GNIS feature IDs: 1657904; 2628703

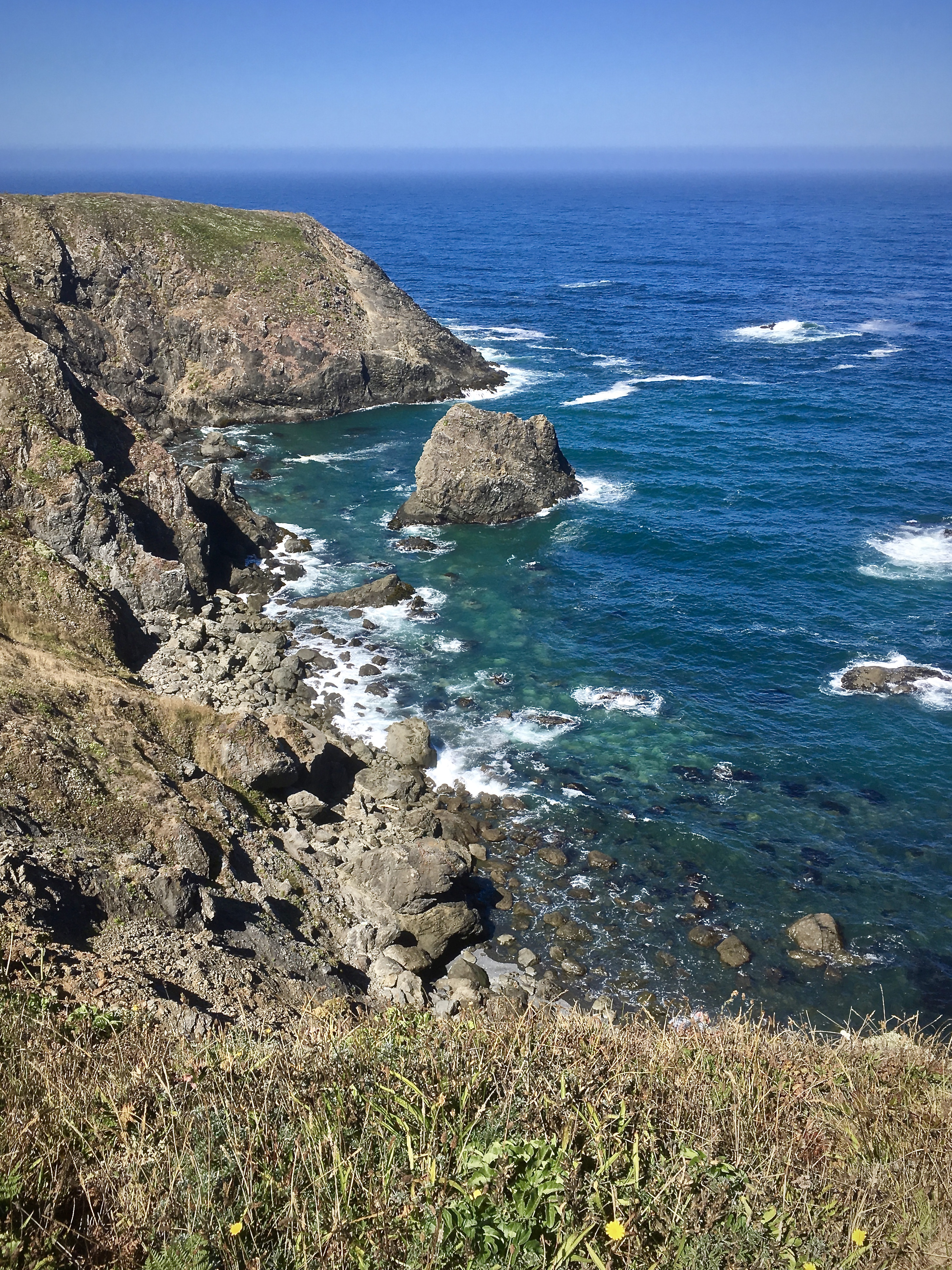
Navarro Point Preserve off CA-1 near Albion

Albion is an unincorporated community in Mendocino County, California, United States. It is located 15 miles (24 km) south of Fort Bragg, at an elevation of 174 feet (53 m). For statistical purposes, the United States Census Bureau has designated Albion as a census-designated place (CDP). Albion had a population of 153 at the 2020 census.

== Toponym ==
Albion was named in 1844, as a reference to when Sir Francis Drake landed on the northern California coast and called it "New Albion". Albion was an ancient name for Britain, from the Latin word albus, meaning "white", a reference to the White Cliffs of Dover.

== Geography ==
Albion lies directly on California's State Route 1 (Shoreline Highway) north of Elk and south of Mendocino and Little River. It lies just north of the intersection of State Route 1 with State Route 128. Albion Ridge Road leads east from the town center. The side roads on Albion Ridge Road are labeled from B through Q.

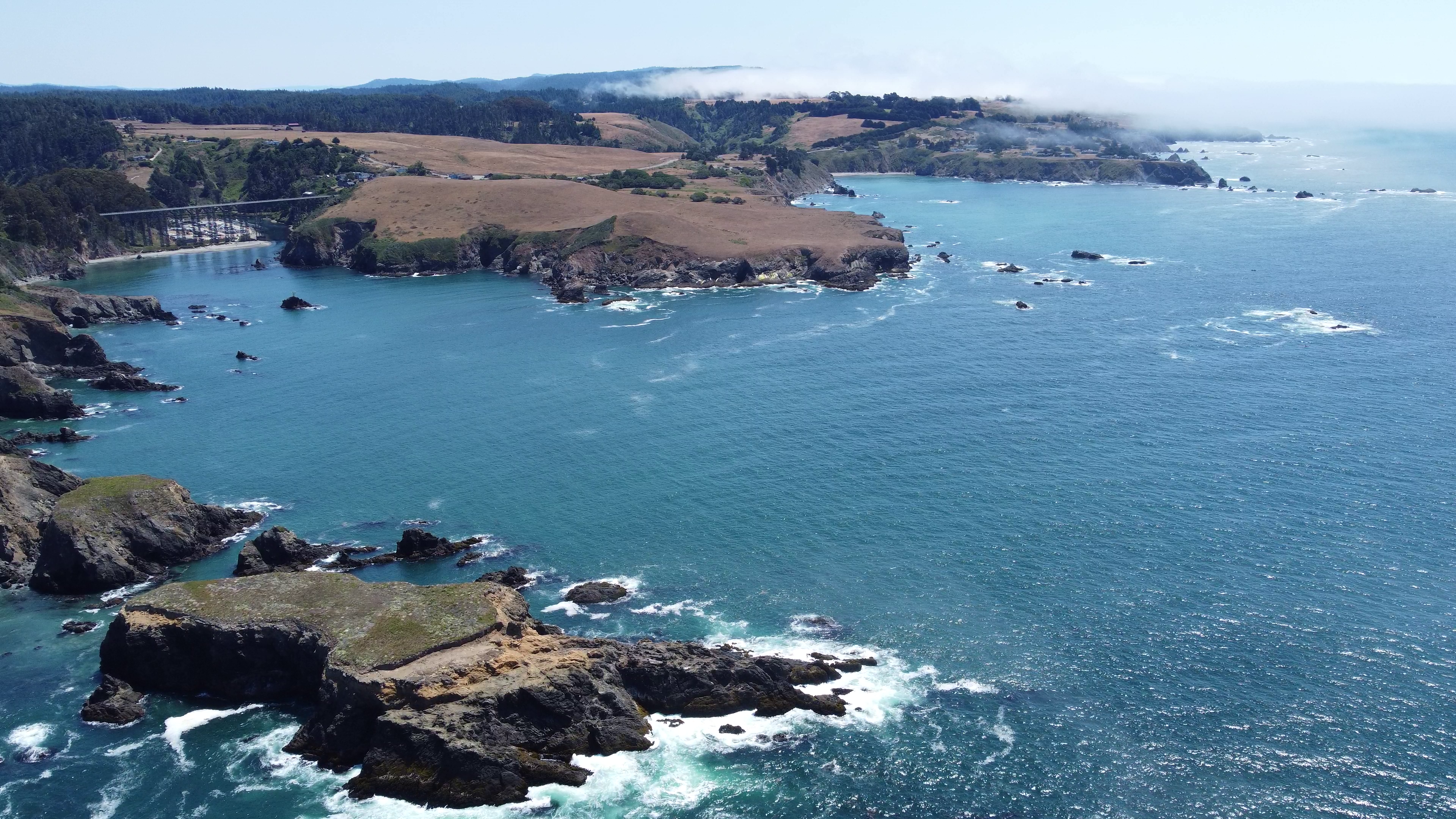
Shot of Albion Head and Albion Bridge from the ocean

The nearest beaches include Navarro Beach to the south and Handley Beach at the head of Albion Ridge Road.

Vegetation includes coastal headlands, with California redwood forests and pygmy forests nearby.

Albion has two bridges, one spanning the Albion River and the other Little Salmon Creek. The Albion River Bridge, built in 1944 when steel and concrete were in short supply, remains as the last wooden bridge still in use on State Route 1.

The ZIP Code is 95410. The community is inside area code 707.

According to the United States Census Bureau, the CDP covers an area of 1.85 square miles (4.8 km^{2}), of which 0.04 square miles (0.10 km^{2}), or 2.0%, are water.

== Schools ==
The town belongs to the Mendocino Unified School District, and children attend Albion Elementary School or Mendocino K-8 School until third grade, then Mendocino K-8 School and Mendocino High School.

The Albion Biological Field Station, a facility of Pacific Union College (a private Seventh-day Adventist college) is located in Albion, on the south bank of the Albion River; it offers college biology courses to Pacific Union students as well as shorter courses for elementary and high school students and seniors.

== Demographics ==
Historical population
Census	Pop.	Note	%±
2010	168		—
2020	153		−8.9%
U.S. Decennial Census; 1860–1870 1880-1890; 1900 1910 1920; 1930 1940 1950; 1960 1970 1980; 1990 2000 2010

Albion first appeared as a census designated place in the 2010 U.S. census.

=== 2020 census ===
As of the 2020 census, Albion had a population of 153. The population density was 84.3 inhabitants per square mile (32.5/km^{2}). The median age was 60.3 years. There were 80 males and 73 females. For every 100 females there were 109.6 males, and for every 100 females age 18 and over there were 101.4 males age 18 and over.

The census reported that 94.1% of the population lived in households, 5.9% lived in non-institutionalized group quarters, and none were institutionalized. 0.0% of residents lived in urban areas, while 100.0% lived in rural areas.

The age distribution was 6.5% under the age of 18, 9.8% aged 18 to 24, 14.4% aged 25 to 44, 26.1% aged 45 to 64, and 43.1% who were 65 years of age or older.

There were 74 households, of which 20.3% had children under the age of 18 living in them. Of all households, 44.6% were married-couple households, 16.2% were cohabiting couple households, 21.6% were households with a male householder and no spouse or partner present, and 17.6% were households with a female householder and no spouse or partner present. About 27.1% of all households were made up of individuals and 13.6% had someone living alone who was 65 years of age or older. The average household size was 1.95. There were 46 families (62.2% of all households).

There were 111 housing units at an average density of 61.2 units per square mile (23.6 units/km^{2}), of which 74 (66.7%) were occupied and 33.3% were vacant. The homeowner vacancy rate was 8.6% and the rental vacancy rate was 0.0%. Of the occupied units, 71.6% were owner-occupied, and 28.4% were occupied by renters.

Racial composition as of the 2020 census
Race	Number	Percent
White	142	92.8%
Black or African American	0	0.0%
American Indian and Alaska Native	1	0.7%
Asian	0	0.0%
Native Hawaiian and Other Pacific Islander	2	1.3%
Some other race	2	1.3%
Two or more races	6	3.9%
Hispanic or Latino (of any race)	6	3.9%

== Politics ==
In the state legislature, Albion is in the 2nd senatorial district, represented by Democrat Mike McGuire, and the 2nd Assembly district, represented by Democrat Chris Rogers.

Federally, Albion is in California's 2nd congressional district, represented by Democrat Jared Huffman.

== See also ==
- Albion River Inn
- Fensalden Inn
- Albion River Railroad
