= Oak Fire =

Oak Fire may refer to:

- Oak Fire (2020), a wildfire that burned north of Brooktrails in Mendocino County.
- Oak Fire (2022), a wildfire north of Bootjack in Mariposa County and in the Sierra National Forest.
