= Chorizanthe howellii =

Conservation status
- Critically Imperiled (NatureServe)

Scientific classification
- Kingdom: Plantae
- Clade: Tracheophytes
- Clade: Angiosperms
- Clade: Eudicots
- Order: Caryophyllales
- Family: Polygonaceae
- Genus: Chorizanthe
- Species: C. howellii

Binomial name
- Chorizanthe howellii Goodman

Species of flowering plant

Chorizanthe howellii is a species of flowering plant in the buckwheat family known by the common names Mendocino spineflower and Howell's spineflower. It is endemic to coastal Mendocino County, California, where it is known only from the sand dunes and coastal scrub near Fort Bragg. It is estimated that 95% of the remaining individuals of this plant are part of a single population growing at MacKerricher State Park. It is a federally listed endangered species.

This is a decumbent or spreading species, growing hairy stems along the ground up to about 10 centimeters long. The inflorescence is a cluster of flowers, each surrounded by a starlike array of six spreading white bracts tipped with straight brown awns. The flower itself is a few millimeters wide and white to pale pink in color.

Threats to this species have historically included off-road vehicle use, trampling by people on foot and horseback, non-native plant species such as the iceplant Carpobrotus edulis and beachgrass Ammophila arenaria. These impacts have been reduced in the state park with a ban on off-road vehicles, limiting foot and horse traffic, and removal of non-native plant species.
