= Inglenook, California =

Unincorporated community in California, United States

Inglenook
- Unincorporated community
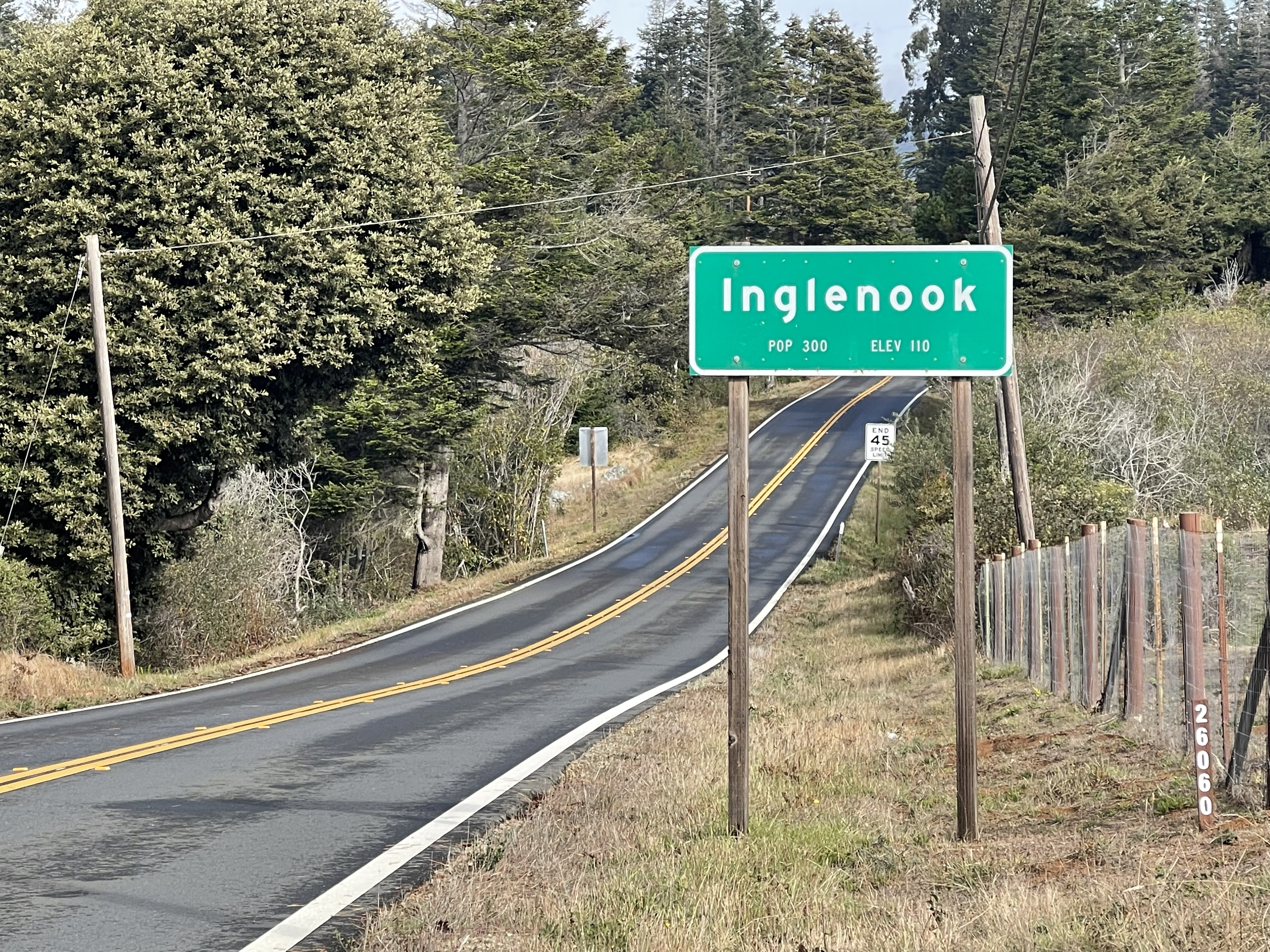

- Location in California Inglenook (the United States)
- Coordinates: 39°31′47″N 123°45′32″W
- Country: United States
- State: California
- County: Mendocino
- Elevation: 102 ft (31 m)

Inglenook is an unincorporated community in Mendocino County, California, United States. It is located on Inglenook Creek, 8 miles (13 km) south of Westport and approximately 3 miles (5 km) north of Cleone, at an elevation of 102 feet (31 m). California State Highway 1 passes through the town, connecting it to Cleone and Fort Bragg to the south and Westport to the north. Ten Mile River passes near the community to the north, and MacKerricher State Park and the Inglenook Fen separate it from the Pacific Ocean to the west.

Long before it became known as Inglenook, a group of Tuluwat Pattern people (named from their habitation of Tuluwat Island farther to the north on the California coast) inhabited the Inglenook Fen from circa 400 to 600 CE.

James W. Nichalson, a blacksmith, settled in Inglenook and opened a smithy in 1877, later becoming justice of the peace. A post office operated at Inglenook from 1880 to 1919, located within a general store. Although far from San Francisco, the 1906 San Francisco earthquake toppled the chimneys of all the town's houses, and many local trees. Inglenook was also the site of a schoolhouse that eventually became a National Grange hall, and was part of a legal dispute from 2013 to 2020 between the National Grange and a breakaway local group opposed to genetically modified food. While the dispute was ongoing, the Grange was renamed as the Fort Bragg–Inglenook Community Center.
