= Bear Haven Creek =

Stream in Mendocino County, California (USA), northeast of Fort Bragg

- Location in California
- Location: Mendocino County, California, USA
- Coordinates: 39°33′22″N 123°40′50″W
- Type: Stream

Bear Haven Creek is a stream in the U.S. state of California. It is located in Mendocino County.
