= Ten Mile River (California) =

River in Mendocino County, California (USA), north of Fort Bragg

Ten Mile River (California) Ten Mile Creek, Tenmile
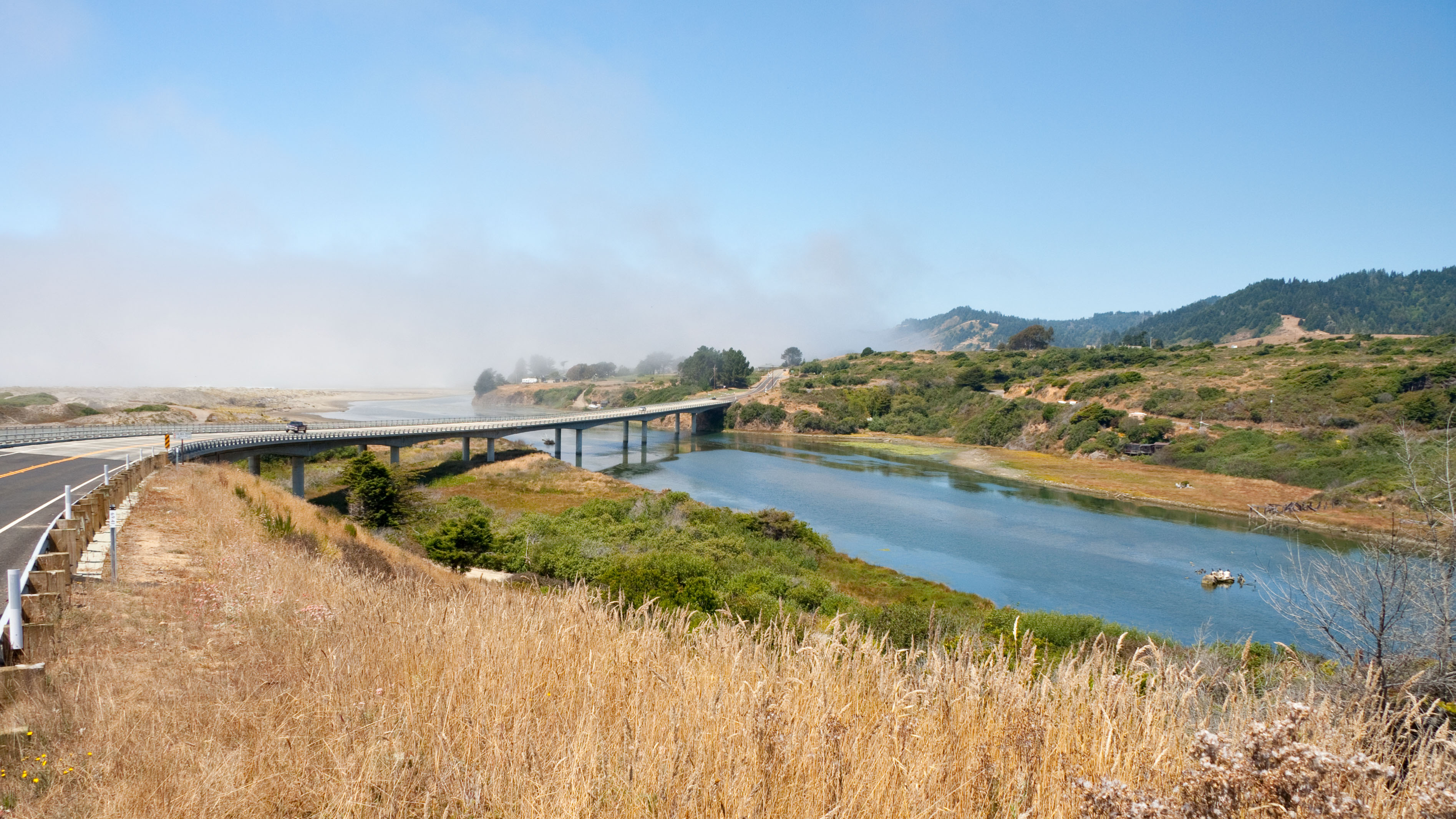
- Ten Mile River, looking north from California 1

Location
- Country: United States
- State: California
- Region: Mendocino

Physical characteristics
- Source: Confluence of North Fork Ten Mile Creek and Middle Fork Ten Mile Creek
  - coordinates: 39°33′10″N 123°46′01″W
  - elevation: 49 ft (15 m)
- Mouth: Pacific Ocean
  - coordinates: 39°33′10″N 123°46′01″W
  - elevation: 0 ft (0 m)

Basin features
- Tributaries
  - left: Middle Fork Ten Mile Creek, Mill Creek, California, South Fork Ten Mile Creek
  - right: North Fork Ten Mile Creek

Ten Mile River (also known as Ten Mile Creek) is in northern Mendocino County, California, United States. It is named for the fact that its mouth is 10 miles (16 km) north of the mouth of the Noyo River. The lands around lower Ten Mile River provide valuable freshwater and saltwater marsh habitat for a variety of birds. The Ten Mile River Estuary, Ten Mile Beach, and Ten Mile State Marine Reserve together form a marine protected area that extends from the estuary out to 5 nautical miles (9.3 km; 5.8 mi). Ten Mile Beach is also part of MacKerricher State Park, which extends approximately 5 miles (8.0 km) southward from the mouth of the river to Cleone and includes approximately 1,300 acres (526 ha) of the "most pristine stretch of sand dunes [in California]."

== History ==
The Ten Mile River basin has been logged continuously since the early 1870s. At first, trees were cut using single-bladed axes and dragged by oxen to mills at Fort Bragg, 10 miles (16 km) to the south. Railroad lines were introduced on the South Fork in 1910 and on the other parts of the river in the 1920s. In the 1930s, the railroads were replaced by tractor roads; after the passage of the California Forest Practice Act in 1973, tractor logging on steeper slopes was supplanted by more environmentally friendly practices such as the use of cables. The timber on both sides of the river was logged by the Georgia Pacific Company until 1999, when Georgia-Pacific's holdings in the area were acquired by the Hawthorne Timber Company. Timber in the area is logged on a 60-year rotation.

An 1861 story in Harper's Monthly includes a passage recounting the crossing of Ten Mile River: "We found the crossing a little dangerous on account of the tide, which sometimes renders it impassable for several hours, except by swimming. With some plunging, spurring, and kicking, the opposite side was gained in due time". Later, the river was spanned near its mouth by a bridge on California State Route 1, north of the community of Inglenook. A concrete beam bridge replaced an older wooden deck truss bridge in 1954. After studies found that the 1954 bridge was insufficiently earthquake-safe, a new concrete box girder bridge on Highway 1 was constructed in 2009. The new bridge is 45 feet (14 m) wide and 1,479 feet (451 m) long; it cost $43.5 million to construct.

In 2012, the Ten Mile River Estuary was designated as a State Marine Conservation Area (SMCA) under the Marine Life Protection Act. At the same time, Ten Mile Beach SMCA and Ten Mile State State Marine Reserve were established, creating a continuous Marine Protected Area (MPA) zone that extends from the upper limit of the estuary out to 5 nautical miles (9.3 km; 5.8 mi). The MPA zone complements the protections for neighboring lands, including MacKerricher State Park and Inglenook Fen-Ten Mile Dunes Natural Preserve.

== Ecology ==
The Ten Mile River has intermittent ocean connectivity, so that the estuary effectively becomes a freshwater lagoon in some years. As a result, seasonal use by anadromous and marine fishes varies significantly from year to year. When the mouth is open, Ten Mile River Estuary serves as a migration corridor for anadromous salmonids and a rearing area for juvenile coastal fishes, including flatfish and surfperch. In summer, juvenile shiner surfperch (Cymatogaster aggregata) will flock to the highly productive salt marshes when tidally flooded. This changes in years when the mouth is closed - salinities are reduced, slack tides can persist for hours, and the winter fish community of sculpins and Three-spined Stickleback (Gasterosteus aculeatus) continues to dominate through summer. Lagoon conditions are ideal for the endangered Tidewater goby (Eucyclogobius newberryi), which prefers slow-moving habitats. The goby is found in the estuary and several miles upstream in areas impounded by California Golden beavers (Castor canadensis subauratus). The dunes surrounding the estuary are home to rare plant species, while the freshwater and saltwater marshes along the estuary provide critical bird habitat. The area is popular for paddle sports and birding.

Historically, the Ten Mile River had an important Coho Salmon population, but it has since been surpassed by Steelhead. The river provides cold freshwater habitat for fish migration and spawning, but is environmentally impacted by logging like many rivers in the area. A United States Environmental Protection Agency study reported that "Sediment was determined to be impacting the cold water fishery, a beneficial use of the Ten Mile River watershed, including the migration, spawning, reproduction, and early development of cold water fish such as coho salmon and steelhead trout. Cold freshwater and estuarine habitats are also designated beneficial uses of the Ten Mile River watershed." The spawning population of coho salmon in Ten Mile River has been observed to decrease from an estimate of 6000 fish in the early 1960s to much lower numbers ranging from 14 to 250 in the 1990s. Contributing factors to this decline include natural variability, excessive sedimentation from logging, increased water temperatures due to the removal of riparian vegetation, and reduced woody debris in salmon habitats. As a result of these impacts, the river was listed as sediment impaired under section 303(d) of the Clean Water Act in 1998. Improved timber harvest practices and regular road maintenance have reduced sedimentation and allowed continued active management for timber harvest in 45% of the Ten Mile River watershed.

== Watershed ==
The Ten Mile River mainstem begins at the confluence of North Fork Ten Mile River and Middle Fork Ten Mile River, flows southwest then northwest to the Pacific Ocean 5.7 miles (9.2 km) south of Westport. The North Fork Ten Mile River begins at elevation 2,400 feet (732 m). The Middle Fork Ten Mile River begins at elevation 2,460 feet (750 m) on the north side of Sherwood Peak. The middle and north forks of the river are each 15 miles (24 km) long, and the river extends 7 miles (11 km) longer from their confluence to its mouth at the Pacific Ocean. The watershed drains approximately 120 square miles (310 km^{2}) and is neighbored to the south by the Noyo River watershed and to the east and north by the South Fork Eel River watershed.

River flow is precipitation-driven. Annual rainfall averages 40 inches (1,000 mm) on the coast and 51 inches (1,300 mm) inland. Under low flow conditions, sand bars constrict the narrow river mouth, often blocking it entirely in summer. When this occurs, the estuarine portion of the Ten Mile River temporarily becomes a freshwater lagoon, where salinity and tidal influence are both reduced. Estuarine conditions return when large storm events re-establish ocean connectivity.

== See also ==
- List of rivers of California
