= Bee Tree Creek =

River in California, U.S.

Coordinates: 39°00′31″N 123°35′48″W

Bee Tree Creek is a stream in Mendocino County, California United States.
