= Virgin Creek =

Stream in Mendocino County, California, US

Coordinates: 39.4714°N 123.8042°W

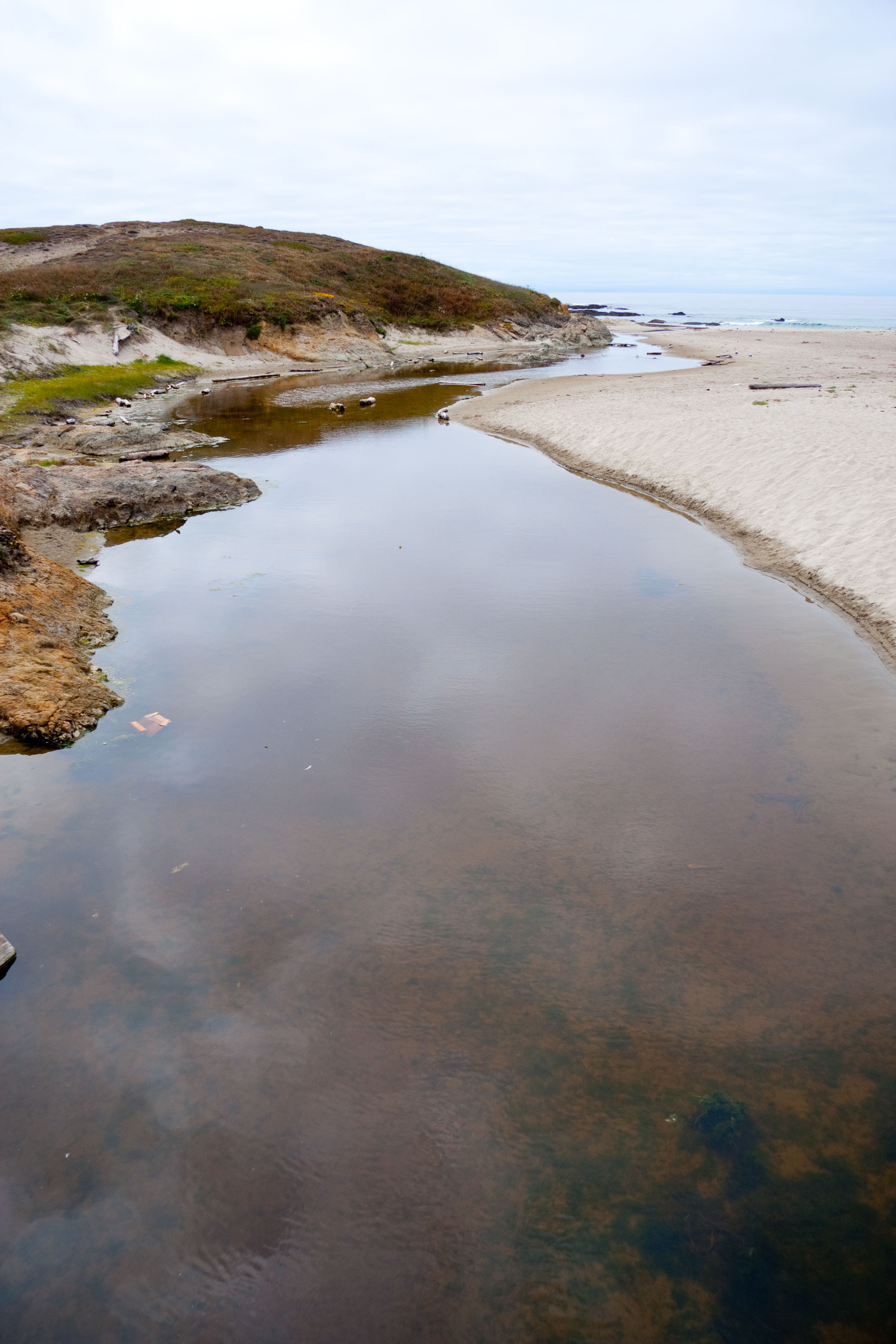

Location
- Country: United States
- State: California

Physical characteristics
- Length: 2.9 mi (4.7 km)

Virgin Creek is a small stream in Mendocino County, California north of Fort Bragg. It is approximately 2.9 miles (4.7 km) long, with no tributaries, and drains a watershed area of approximately 4.2 square miles (11 km^{2}). It passes from forested areas near its headwaters, at an elevation of 320 feet (98 m), through residential developments, to a sandy beach on the Pacific Ocean in MacKerricher State Park at its mouth. Approximately 1.5 miles (2.4 km) from the mouth, it passes over a waterfall approximately 9 feet (2.7 m) high that may form a barrier for fish; below the waterfall, young salmon have been observed.

An old haul road, once used for logging and now a pedestrian and bicycle trail, crosses the creek on the west side of California State Route 1, and provides access to the beach at the mouth of the creek. The beach is well known as a surf break, with swells up to 6 feet (1.8 m) in both directions. Other beach activities include bird watching and tide pooling at low tide. However pets are not allowed, even on leashes.
