= Anchor Bay, California =

Anchor Bay
- census-designated place
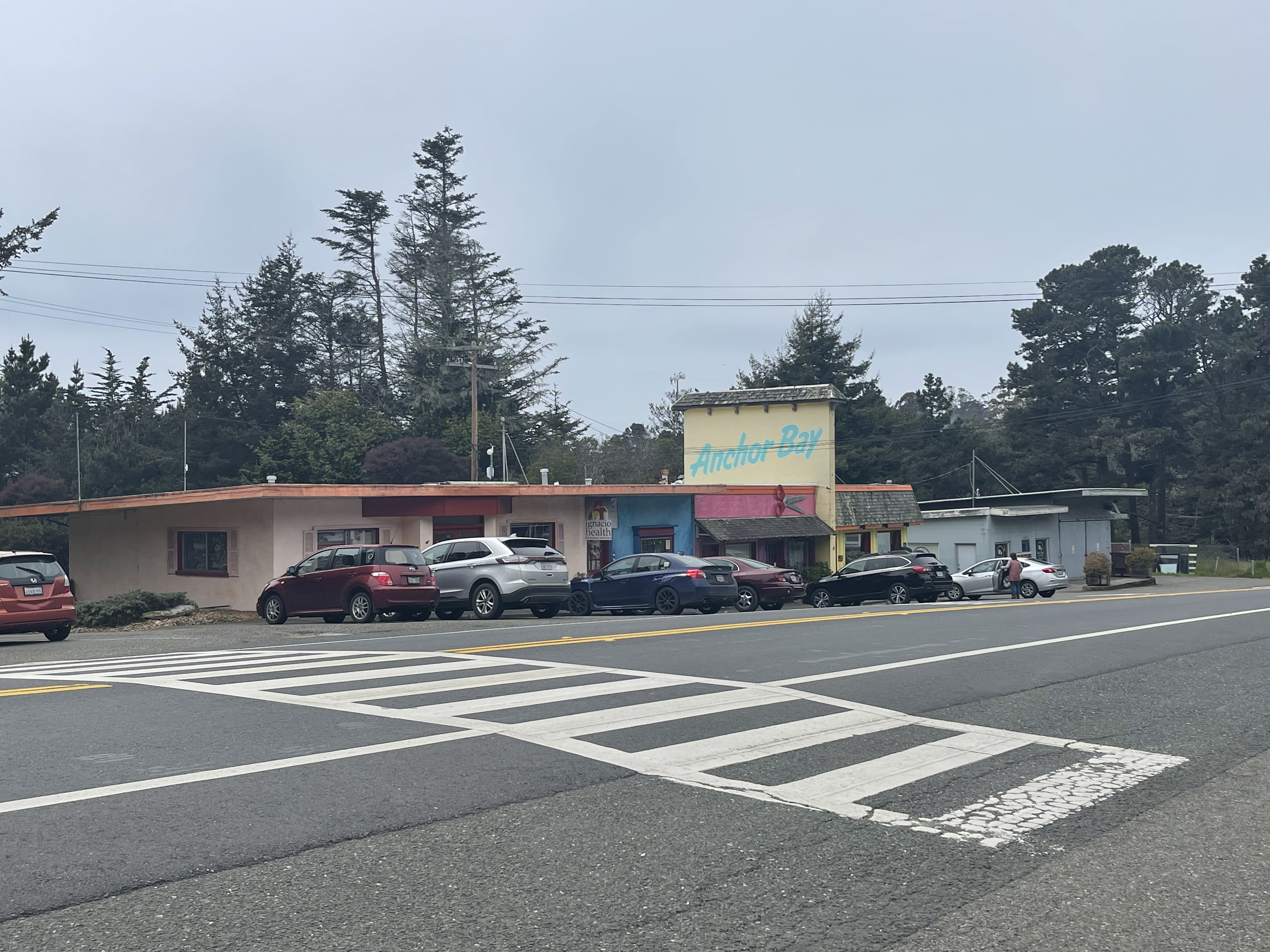
- Anchor Bay in April 2023.

- Location of Anchor Bay in Mendocino County, California

- Location in California
- Coordinates: 38°48′10″N 123°34′40″W
- Country: United States
- State: California
- County: Mendocino

Area
  - Total: 3.51 sq mi (9.10 km^{2})
  - Land: 3.51 sq mi (9.10 km^{2})
  - Water: 0 sq mi (0.00 km^{2}) 0%
- Elevation: 105 ft (32 m)

Population (2020)
  - Total: 473
  - Density: 134.7/sq mi (51.99/km^{2})
- Time zone: UTC-8 (Pacific (PST))
  - Summer (DST): UTC-7 (PDT)
- ZIP code: 95445
- Area code: 707
- GNIS feature IDs: 1657928; 2628706

Anchor Bay (formerly Anchor Bay Settlement) is a census-designated place in Mendocino County, California, United States. It is located 3.5 miles (5.6 km) northwest of Gualala, at an elevation of 105 feet (32 m). The population was 473 at the 2020 census.

== Geography ==
According to the United States Census Bureau, the CDP covers an area of 3.5 square miles (9.1 km^{2}), all land.

== Climate ==
The climate of Anchor Bay is Mediterranean, characterized by warm, dry summers, at times exceeding 78 °F or 25.6 °C, and mild, rainy winters, with lows at night falling below freezing at times.

Climate data for Anchor Bay, California
Month	Jan	Feb	Mar	Apr	May	Jun	Jul	Aug	Sep	Oct	Nov	Dec	Year
Mean daily maximum °F (°C)	58 (14)	59 (15)	60 (16)	61 (16)	63 (17)	65 (18)	67 (19)	68 (20)	69 (21)	67 (19)	62 (17)	58 (14)	63 (17)
Mean daily minimum °F (°C)	40 (4)	43 (6)	43 (6)	43 (6)	47 (8)	49 (9)	51 (11)	51 (11)	50 (10)	46 (8)	42 (6)	40 (4)	45 (7)
Average rainfall inches (mm)	7.2 (180)	6.1 (150)	5.6 (140)	3.0 (76)	0.6 (15)	0.2 (5.1)	0.2 (5.1)	0.5 (13)	0.9 (23)	2.5 (64)	6.0 (150)	7.4 (190)	40.2 (1,011.2)
Average rainy days	10	9	10	6	2	1	0	1	2	5	8	10	64

== Demographics ==
Historical population
Census	Pop.	Note	%±
2010	340		—
2020	473		39.1%
U.S. Decennial Census; 1860–1870 1880-1890; 1900 1910 1920; 1930 1940 1950; 1960 1970 1980; 1990 2000 2010

=== 2020 census ===
As of the 2020 census, Anchor Bay had a population of 473, with a population density of 134.6 inhabitants per square mile (52.0/km^{2}). The median age was 60.4 years. The age distribution was 7.8% under the age of 18, 4.0% aged 18 to 24, 17.3% aged 25 to 44, 38.1% aged 45 to 64, and 32.8% who were 65 years of age or older. For every 100 females there were 81.2 males, and for every 100 females age 18 and over there were 78.0 males age 18 and over.

0.0% of residents lived in urban areas, while 100.0% lived in rural areas.

The whole population lived in households. There were 246 households in Anchor Bay, of which 7.7% had children under the age of 18 living in them. Of all households, 42.3% were married-couple households, 8.1% were cohabiting couple households, 21.1% were households with a male householder and no spouse or partner present, and 28.5% were households with a female householder and no spouse or partner present. About 39.4% of all households were made up of individuals and 22.4% had someone living alone who was 65 years of age or older. The average household size was 1.92. There were 129 families (52.4% of all households).

There were 372 housing units at an average density of 105.9 units per square mile (40.9 units/km^{2}), of which 246 (66.1%) were occupied. Of the occupied units, 80.1% were owner-occupied and 19.9% were renter-occupied. Of all housing units, 33.9% were vacant. The homeowner vacancy rate was 0.0% and the rental vacancy rate was 10.9%.

Racial composition as of the 2020 census
Race	Number	Percent
White	395	83.5%
Black or African American	0	0.0%
American Indian and Alaska Native	4	0.8%
Asian	4	0.8%
Native Hawaiian and Other Pacific Islander	0	0.0%
Some other race	24	5.1%
Two or more races	46	9.7%
Hispanic or Latino (of any race)	36	7.6%

=== 2010 census ===
Anchor Bay first appeared as a census designated place in the 2010 U.S. census.

== Politics ==
In the state legislature, Anchor Bay is in the 2nd senatorial district, represented by Democrat Mike McGuire, and the 2nd Assembly district, represented by Democrat Chris Rogers.

Federally, Anchor Bay is in California's 2nd congressional district, represented by Democrat Jared Huffman.
