= Brooktrails, California =

Unincorporated community in California, United States

Brooktrails
- Census-designated place
- Location in Mendocino County and California

- Location within California Location within the United States
- Coordinates: 39°26′38″N 123°23′07″W
- Country: United States
- State: California
- County: Mendocino

Area
  - Total: 7.32 sq mi (19.0 km^{2})
  - Land: 7.27 sq mi (18.8 km^{2})
  - Water: 0.05 sq mi (0.13 km^{2}) 0.64%
- Elevation: 1,634 ft (498 m)

Population (2020)
  - Total: 3,632
  - Density: 499.45/sq mi (192.84/km^{2})
- Time zone: UTC-8 (Pacific (PST))
  - Summer (DST): UTC-7 (PDT)
- ZIP code: 95490 (Willits)
- Area code: 707
- GNIS feature ID: 1724158; 2628713

Brooktrails is a census-designated place and unincorporated community in Mendocino County, California, United States. It shares ZIP code 95490 with Willits. The population was 3,632 at the 2020 census.

== History ==
After being extensively logged from the 1880s to the middle of the twentieth century, Brooktrails Township was founded under a special provision in state law. It was marketed as a vacation mountain retreat for San Franciscans in the 1970s. It has approximately 6,600 parcels varying in size from 0.3 acres (0.12 ha) to 10 acres (4.0 ha). The smaller parcels are mostly surrounded by the township-owned Brooktrails Redwood Park, a 2,600-acre (1,100 ha) forest green belt composed of tan oak, Douglas fir and redwood. Brooktrails has over 30 hiking trails and two lakes, Lake Emily and Lake Ada Rose, that store and direct water to its water treatment plant. There is also a small market and a deli. The Brooktrails Township Community Services District, governed by a five-member elected board of directors, provides water, sewer, and recreational services to the residents.

In 2012, Mendocino County paid the back assessments on hundreds of abandoned Brooktrails lots; however, they stopped paying water, sewer and fire assessments for those lots.

The entire community of Brooktrails was evacuated in September 2020 due to the threat of the Oak Fire.

== Geography ==
Brooktrails is in central Mendocino County, occupying hills to the west of Little Lake Valley. The fire department and golf course lie at an elevation of 1,634 feet (498 m), but the community's western edge rises to nearly 3,000 feet (910 m). It is 3 miles (5 km) north of Willits. According to the United States Census Bureau, the CDP covers an area of 7.3 square miles (19 km^{2}), 99.36% of it land, and 0.64% of it water.

== Demographics ==
Historical population
Census	Pop.	Note	%±
2010	3,235		—
2020	3,632		12.3%
2023 (est.)	4,394	▲	21.0%
U.S. Decennial Census; 1850–1870 1880-1890; 1900 1910 1920; 1930 1940 1950; 1960 1970 1980; 1990 2000 2010

Brooktrails first appeared as a census designated place in the 2010 U.S. census.

=== 2020 census ===
As of the 2020 census, Brooktrails had a population of 3,632, all of whom lived in households. The population density was 499.4 inhabitants per square mile (192.8/km^{2}). 51.3% of residents lived in urban areas, while 48.7% lived in rural areas.

The age distribution was 24.1% under the age of 18, 6.8% aged 18 to 24, 28.8% aged 25 to 44, 22.1% aged 45 to 64, and 18.2% aged 65 or older. The median age was 37.9 years. For every 100 females, there were 106.8 males, and for every 100 females age 18 and over, there were 102.9 males age 18 and over.

There were 1,370 households, of which 31.4% had children under the age of 18 living in them. Of all households, 48.2% were married-couple households, 12.0% were cohabiting couple households, 18.5% were households with a male householder and no spouse or partner present, and 21.2% were households with a female householder and no spouse or partner present. About 24.2% of all households were one-person households, and 10.3% had someone living alone who was 65 years of age or older. The average household size was 2.65. There were 911 families (66.5% of all households).

There were 1,458 housing units, of which 1,370 (94.0%) were occupied. The homeowner vacancy rate was 1.5% and the rental vacancy rate was 5.6%. Of occupied units, 74.3% were owner-occupied and 25.7% were renter-occupied. The average housing unit density was 200.5 units per square mile (77.4 units/km^{2}).

Racial composition as of the 2020 census
Race	Number	Percent
White	2,780	76.5%
Black or African American	38	1.0%
American Indian and Alaska Native	143	3.9%
Asian	32	0.9%
Native Hawaiian and Other Pacific Islander	8	0.2%
Some other race	255	7.0%
Two or more races	376	10.4%
Hispanic or Latino (of any race)	557	15.3%

=== Income and poverty ===
In 2023, the US Census Bureau estimated that the median household income was $120,099, and the per capita income was $36,946. About 3.1% of families and 3.8% of the population were below the poverty line.

== Notable people ==
- Douglas Killmer, bass guitarist
- Steven Seagal, actor and martial artist

== Politics ==
In the state legislature, Brooktrails is in the 2nd senatorial district, represented by Democrat Mike McGuire, and the 2nd Assembly district, represented by Democrat Chris Rogers.

Federally, Brooktrails is in California's 2nd congressional district, represented by Democrat Jared Huffman.
