= Beebe Creek =

Stream in California

Coordinates: 38°54′43″N 123°15′40″W

Location
- Country: United States
- State: California
- County: Mendocino County

Beebe Creek is a stream located in the U.S. state of California. It is located in Mendocino County.
