= Mendocino County, California =

County in California, United States

Mendocino County
- County
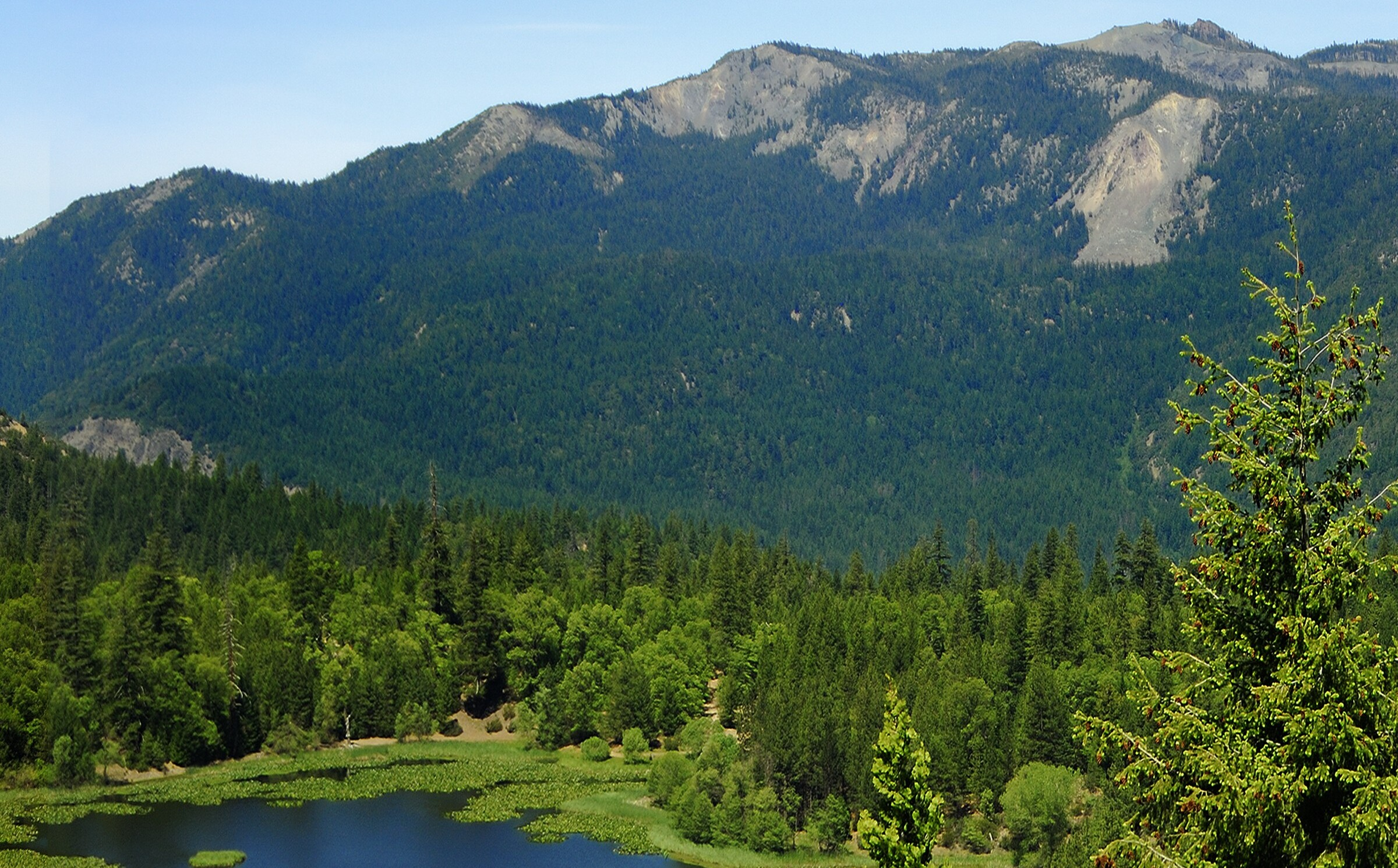
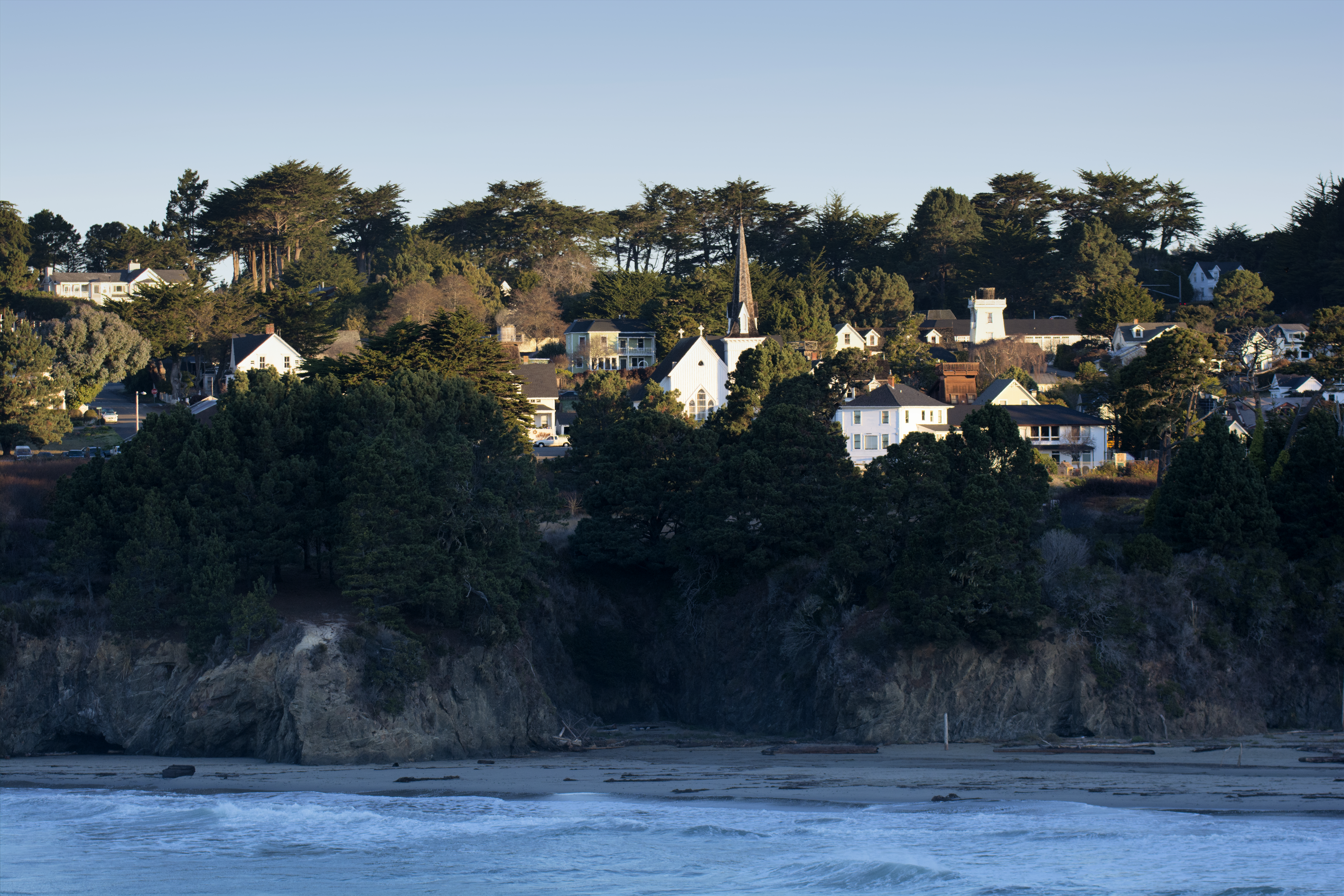
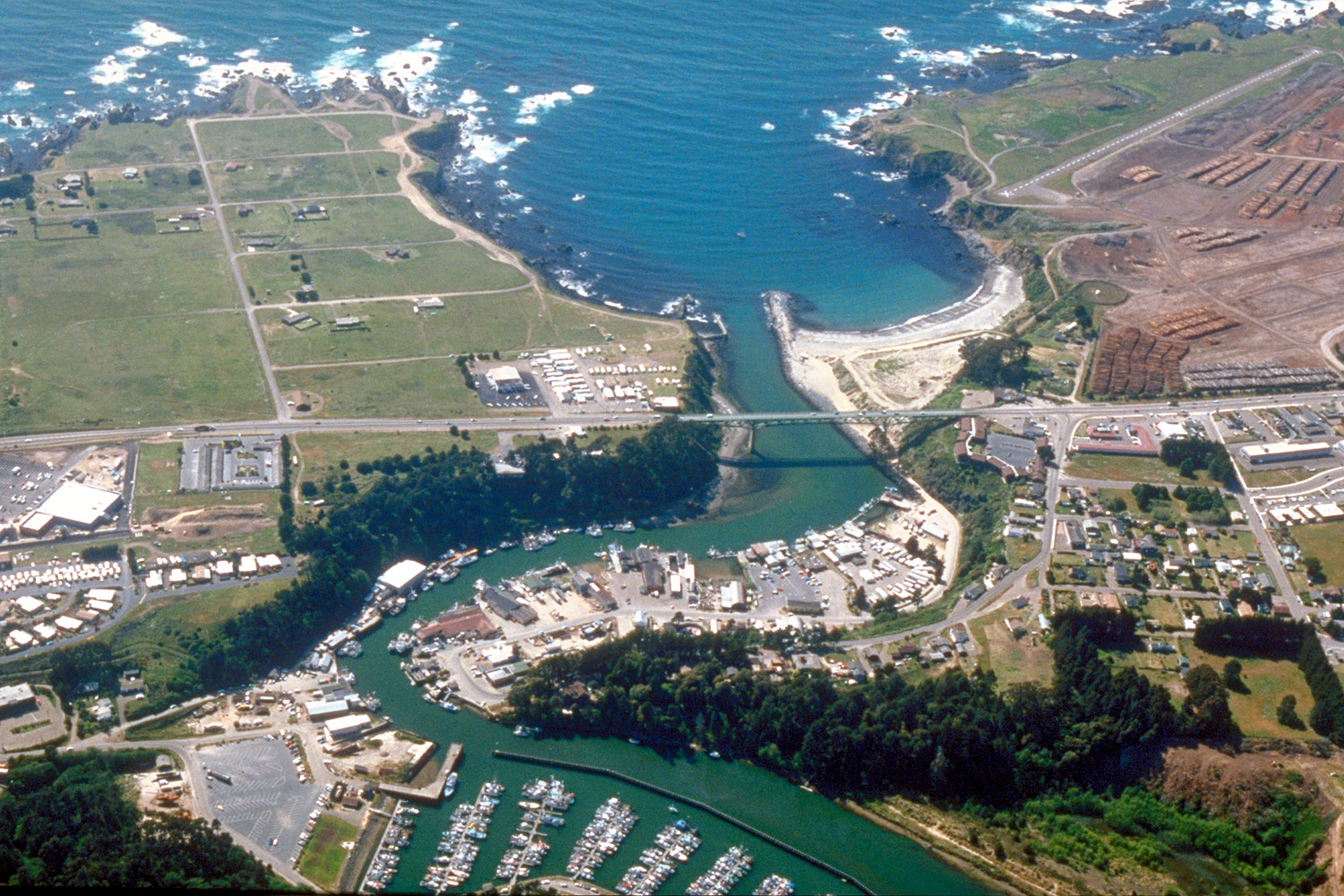
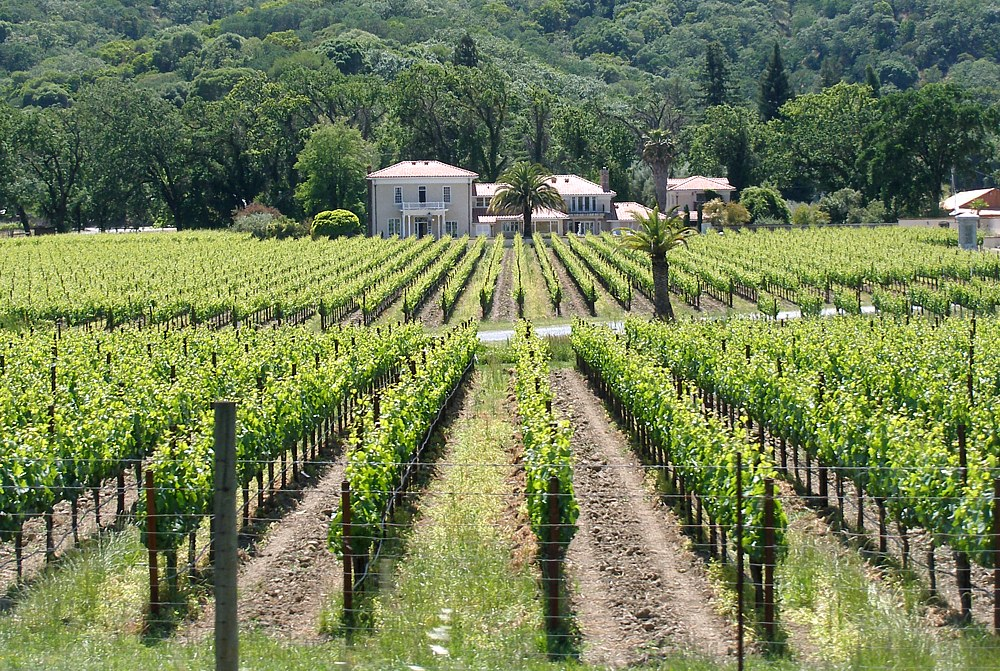
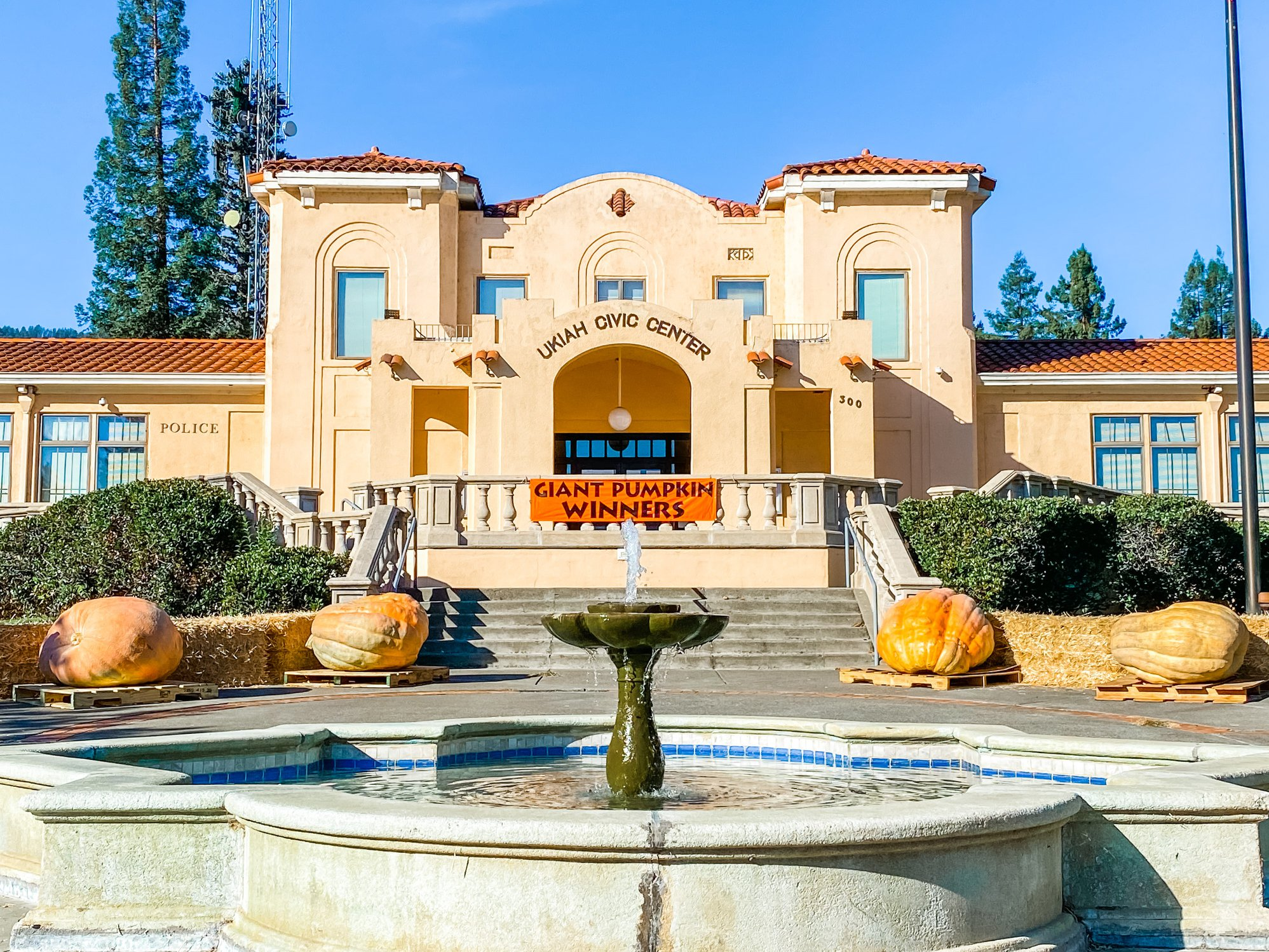
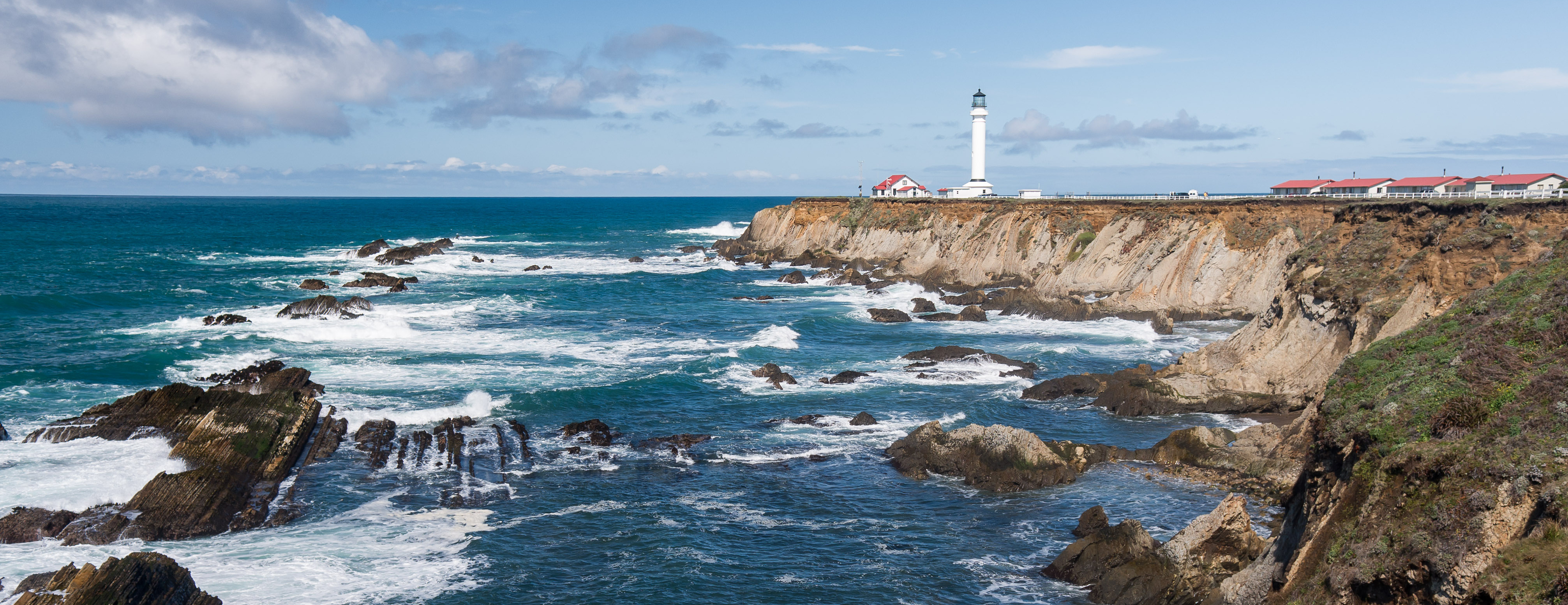
- Mendocino National Forest Mendocino Noyo Harbor Hopland Ukiah Point Arena

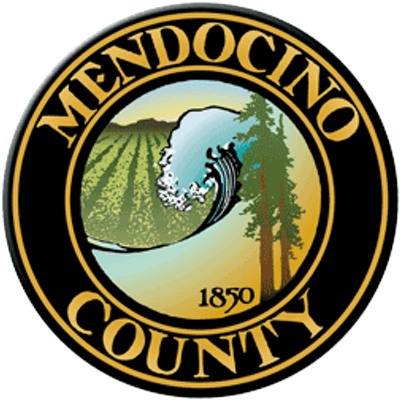
- Seal
- Interactive map of Mendocino County with markers for each of its four incorporated cities: Ukiah (red), Fort Bragg (purple), Point Arena (blue), and Willits (yellow)
- Mendocino County's location within California
- Coordinates (Geographic center of Mendocino County): 39.4692°N 123.3942°W
- Country: United States
- State: California
- Region: North Coast
- Incorporated: February 18, 1850; 176 years ago
- Named for: Antonio de Mendoza, Viceroy of New Spain, 1535–42
- County seat: Ukiah
- Largest city: Ukiah

Government
  - Type: Council–CEO
  - Body: Mendocino County Board of Supervisors
  - Chair: Bernie Norvell
  - Vice Chair: Ted Williams
  - Board of Supervisors: Supervisors: Madeline Cline; Maureen Mulheren; John Haschak; Bernie Norvell; Ted Williams
  - Chief executive officer: Sara Pierce (interim)

Area
  - Total: 3,878 sq mi (10,040 km^{2})
  - Land: 3,506 sq mi (9,080 km^{2})
  - Water: 372 sq mi (960 km^{2})
- Highest elevation: 6,958 ft (2,121 m)

Population (2020)
  - Total: 91,601
  - Estimate (2025): 88,122 ▼
  - Density: 26/sq mi (10/km^{2})

GDP
  - Total: $4.277 billion (2022)
- Time zone: UTC−8 (Pacific Time Zone)
  - Summer (DST): UTC−7 (Pacific Daylight Time)
- Area code: 707
- Congressional district: 2nd
- Website: mendocinocounty.gov

Mendocino County (/ˌmɛndəˈsiːnoʊ/; Mendocino, Spanish for "of Mendoza") is a county located on the North Coast of the U.S. state of California. As of the 2020 United States census, the population was 91,601. The county seat is Ukiah.

Mendocino County consists wholly of the Ukiah, California Micropolitan Statistical Area (μSA) for the purposes of the U.S. Census Bureau. It is located approximately equidistant from the San Francisco Bay Area and California/Oregon border, separated from the Sacramento Valley to the east by the California Coast Ranges. While smaller areas of redwood forest are found farther south, it is the southernmost California county to be included in the World Wildlife Fund's Pacific temperate rainforests ecoregion, the largest temperate rainforest ecoregion on Earth.

The county is noted for its distinctive Pacific Ocean coastline, its location along California's "Lost Coast", redwood forests, wine production, microbrews, and liberal views about the use of cannabis and support for its legalization. In 2009, it was estimated that roughly one-third of the economy was based on the cultivation of marijuana.

Mendocino is one of three Northern California counties to make up the "Emerald Triangle", along with Humboldt and Trinity counties.

== History ==
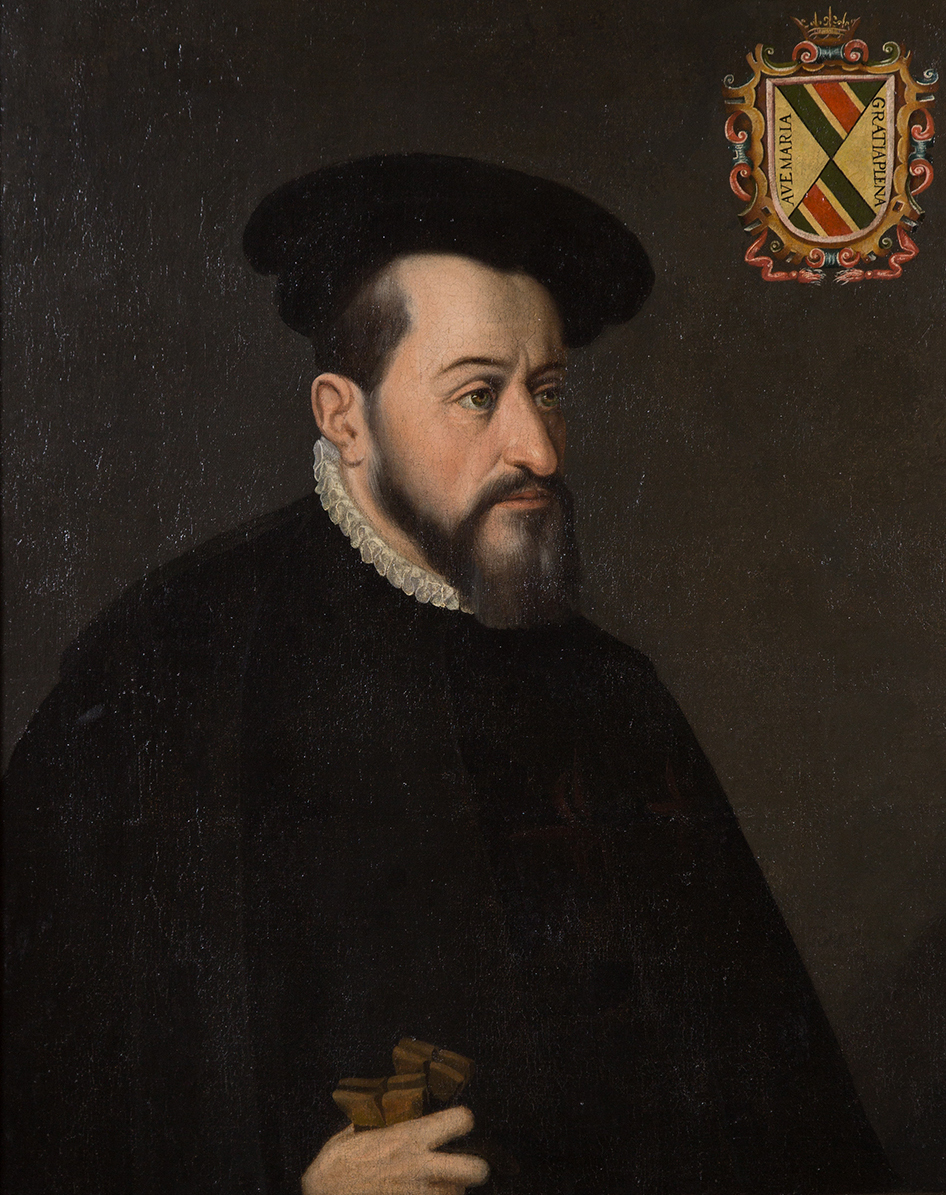
Antonio de Mendoza, the namesake of Mendocino County.

Mendocino County was one of the original counties of California, created in 1850 at the time of statehood. Due to an initially minor settler American population, it did not have a separate government until 1859 and was under the administration of Sonoma County prior to that. Some of the county's land was given to Sonoma County between 1850 and 1860.

The county derives its name from Cape Mendocino (most of which is actually located in adjacent Humboldt County), which was probably named in honor of either Antonio de Mendoza, Viceroy of New Spain, 1535–1542 (who sent the Juan Rodríguez Cabrillo Expedition to this coast in 1542), or Lorenzo Suárez de Mendoza, Viceroy from 1580 to 1583. Mendocino is an adjective derived from the family name of Mendoza, and so means "pertaining to Mendoza".

Neither Spanish nor Mexican influence extended into Mendocino County beyond the establishment of two Mexican land grants in southern Mendocino County: Rancho Sanel in Hopland, in 1844 and Rancho Yokaya that forms the majority of the Ukiah Valley, in 1845.

In the 19th century, despite the establishment of the Mendocino Indian Reservation and Nome Cult Farm in 1856, the county witnessed many of the most serious atrocities in the extermination of the Californian Native American tribes who originally lived in the area, like the Yuki, the Pomo, the Cahto, and the Wintun. The systematic occupation of their lands, the reduction of many of their members into slavery and the raids against their settlements led to the Mendocino War in 1859, where hundreds of Indians were killed. Establishment of the Round Valley Indian Reservation on March 30, 1870, did not prevent the segregation that continued well into the 20th century. Other tribes from the Sierra Nevada mountains were also relocated to the Round Valley Indian Reservation during the "California Trail Of Tears", where the Natives were forced to march in bad conditions to their new home in Round Valley. Many of these tribes thrown together were not on good terms with the other tribes they were forced to live with on the reservation, resulting in tensions still evident today.

=== Boundary dispute with Trinity County ===
In the first half of the 1850's the California State Legislature established that the boundaries of Mendocino and Trinity counties was the 40th parallel north. Both county boards of supervisors hired the surveyor W.H. Fauntleroy to survey the parallel, which he completed on October 30, 1872. The accuracy of the boundary was doubtful, and by 1891 the Mendocino County Board of Supervisors requested the California surveyor-general to survey the line and establish the boundary between the two counties. The new line, as surveyed by Sam H. Rice and approved by the California Attorney General on December 18, 1891, was found to be two miles north of the common boundary surveyed by Fauntleroy, thereby resulting in Trinity County exercising jurisdiction two miles south of the 40th parallel north. Between 1891 and 1907, both counties claimed that the two-mile-wide strip of land belonged to themselves and not the other, with both counties attempting to levy and collect property taxes on land in the strip. In 1907, Trinity County sued Mendocino County in a Tehama County court to settle the dispute. The trial court in Tehama County ruled in favor of Trinity County, even though the land was situated south of the 40th parallel and state law stated that lands south of that parallel belonged to Mendocino County. The appellate court upheld the ruling of the trial court since Section 10 of the special act of March 30, 1872 (Stats. 1871-2, p. 766), which concerned this boundary and was the act under which Fauntleroy acted under, authorized the survey of the theretofore unknown location of the 40th parallel north, stated that "the lines run out, marked and defined as required by this act are hereby declared to be the true boundary lines of the counties named herein", thereby making the law in the political code which defined the boundary as the 40th parallel north only a suggestion and not a fact. The legislature subsequently affirmed this decision, with the modern statute defining the borders of the two counties referencing the survey of Fauntleroy as being the boundary between the two counties instead of the 40th parallel north.

== Geography ==
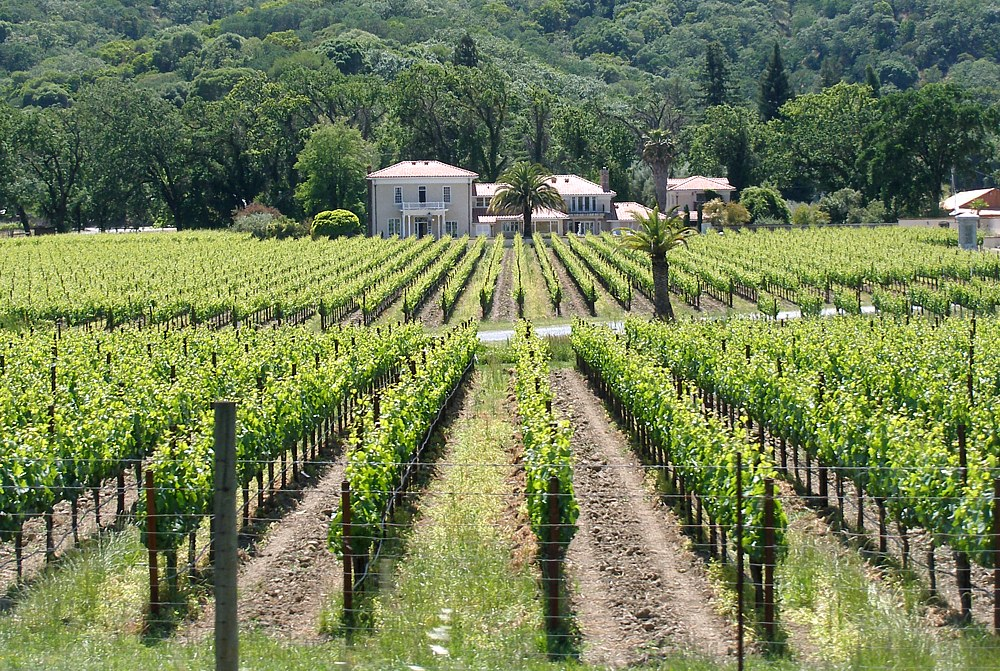
A vineyard in Mendocino County

According to the U.S. Census Bureau, the county has a total area of 3,878 square miles (10,040 km^{2}), of which 3,506 square miles (9,080 km^{2}) is land and 372 square miles (960 km^{2}) (9.6%) is water.

=== Adjacent counties ===
- Humboldt County – north
- Trinity County – north
- Tehama County – northeast
- Glenn County – east
- Lake County – east
- Sonoma County – south

=== Rivers ===
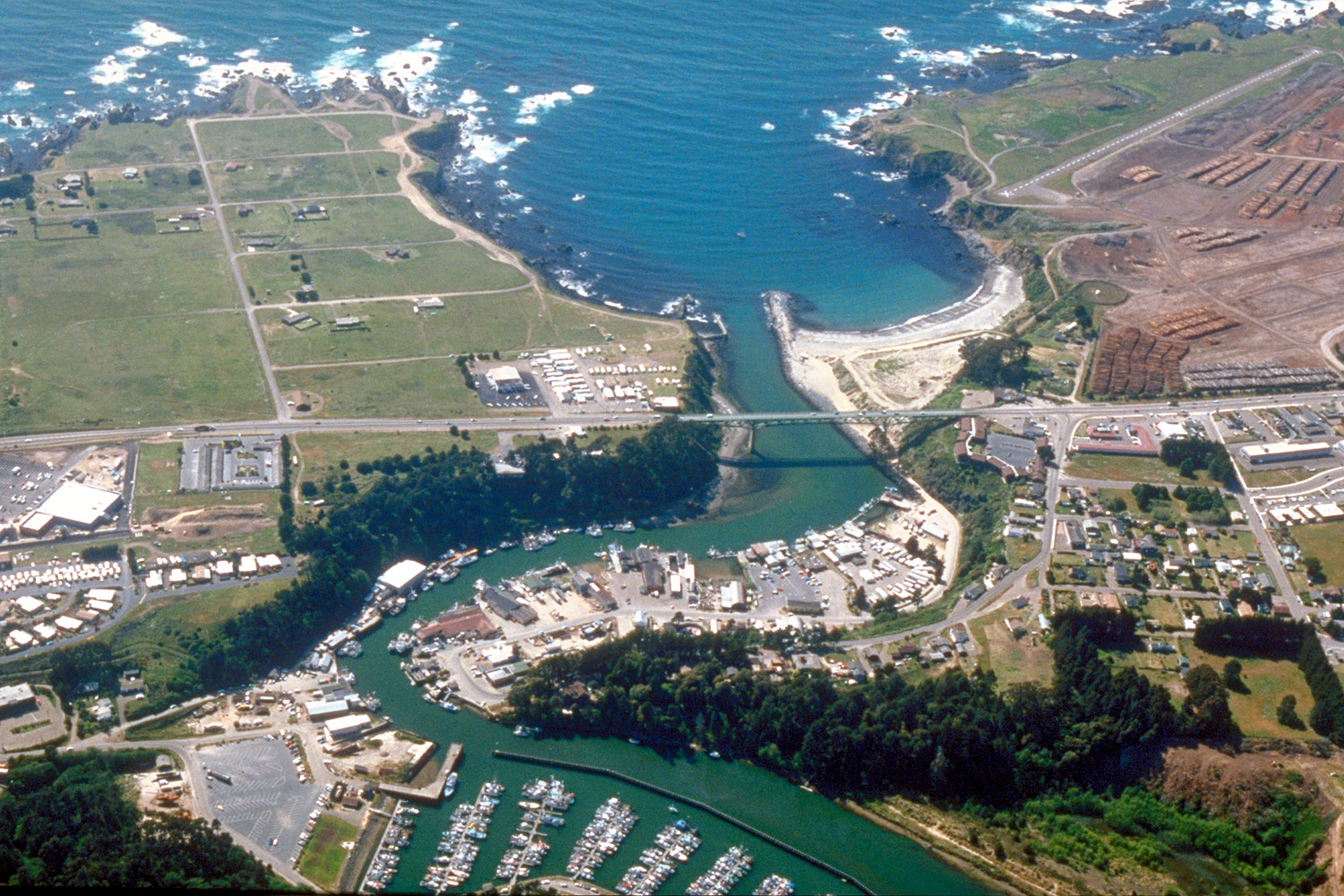
Aerial view of the mouth of the Noyo River on the Pacific Ocean at Fort Bragg

- Albion River
- Alder Creek
- Bear Haven Creek
- Bee Branch Creek
- Bee Tree Creek
- Beebe Creek
- Big River
- Big Salmon Creek
- Eel River (inland)
- Elk Creek
- Gualala River
- Garcia River
- Little River
- Little Salmon Creek
- Navarro River
- Noyo River
- Pudding Creek
- Russian River (inland)
- Ten Mile River
- Virgin Creek
- Usal Creek

=== Beaches ===
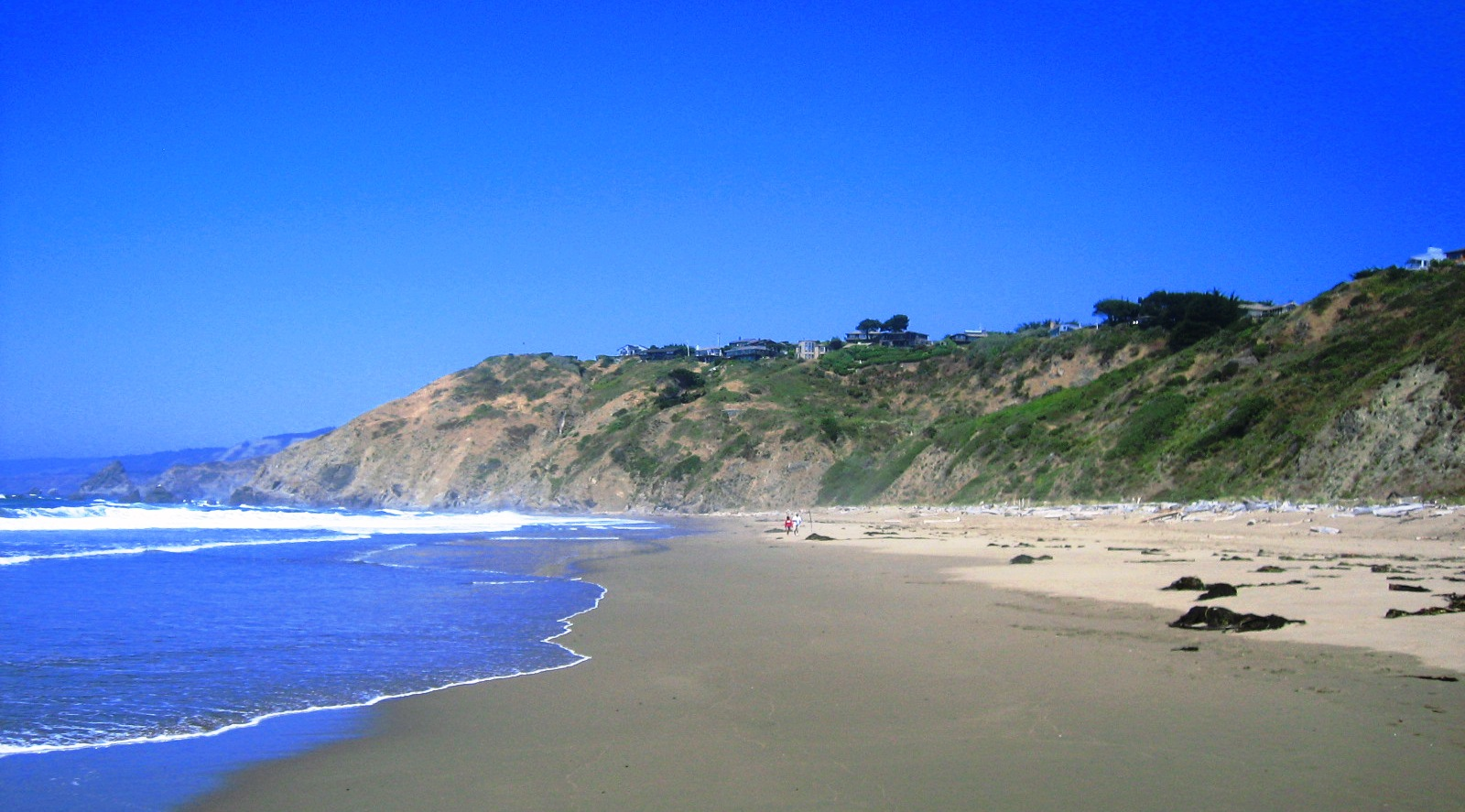
A beach near Elk

- Big River Beach
- Caspar Headlands State Beach
- Van Damme Beach
- Greenwood State Beach
- Seaside Beach
- Westport-Union Landing State Beach
- Manchester State Beach
- Navarro Beach
- Portuguese Beach
- Schooner Gulch State Beach
- Long Valley Creek
- 10 Mile Creek
- Glass Beach

=== National and state protected areas ===
- Admiral William Standley State Recreation Area
- Caspar Headlands State Recreation Area
- Hendy Woods State Park
- Jug Handle State Reserve
- MacKerricher State Park
- Mailliard Redwoods State Natural Reserve
- Manchester State Park
- Mendocino Coast Botanical Gardens
- Mendocino Headlands State Park
- Mendocino National Forest
- Mendocino Woodlands State Park
- Montgomery Woods State Natural Reserve
- Navarro River Redwoods State Park
- Point Arena State Marine Reserve & Point Arena State Marine Conservation Area
- Point Cabrillo Light Station
- Reynolds Wayside Campground
- Round Valley Indian Reservation
- Russian Gulch State Park
- Saunders Reef State Marine Conservation Area
- Sea Lion Cove State Marine Conservation Area
- Sinkyone Wilderness State Park
- Smythe Redwoods State Reserve
- Standish-Hickey State Recreation Area
- Van Damme State Park

== Demographics ==
Historical population
Census	Pop.	Note	%±
1850	55		—
1860	3,967		7,112.7%
1870	7,545		90.2%
1880	12,800		69.6%
1890	17,612		37.6%
1900	20,465		16.2%
1910	23,929		16.9%
1920	24,116		0.8%
1930	23,505		−2.5%
1940	27,864		18.5%
1950	40,854		46.6%
1960	51,059		25.0%
1970	51,101		0.1%
1980	66,738		30.6%
1990	80,345		20.4%
2000	86,265		7.4%
2010	87,841		1.8%
2020	91,601		4.3%
2025 (est.)	88,122	▼	−3.8%
U.S. Decennial Census; 1790–1960 1900–1990; 1990–2000 2010 2020

=== 2020 census ===
As of the 2020 census, the county had a population of 91,601. The median age was 43.2 years. 20.6% of residents were under the age of 18 and 23.1% of residents were 65 years of age or older. For every 100 females there were 100.2 males, and for every 100 females age 18 and over there were 99.2 males age 18 and over.

The racial makeup of the county was 65.0% White, 0.7% Black or African American, 5.1% American Indian and Alaska Native, 2.0% Asian, 0.2% Native Hawaiian and Pacific Islander, 13.9% from some other race, and 13.2% from two or more races. Hispanic or Latino residents of any race comprised 26.1% of the population.

51.5% of residents lived in urban areas, while 48.5% lived in rural areas.

There were 36,280 households in the county, of which 27.7% had children under the age of 18 living with them and 28.0% had a female householder with no spouse or partner present. About 30.1% of all households were made up of individuals and 15.9% had someone living alone who was 65 years of age or older.

There were 41,370 housing units, of which 12.3% were vacant. Among occupied housing units, 59.3% were owner-occupied and 40.7% were renter-occupied. The homeowner vacancy rate was 1.3% and the rental vacancy rate was 3.8%.

=== Racial and ethnic composition ===
Mendocino County, California – Racial and ethnic composition Note: the US Census treats Hispanic/Latino as an ethnic category. This table excludes Latinos from the racial categories and assigns them to a separate category. Hispanics/Latinos may be of any race.
Race / Ethnicity (NH = Non-Hispanic)	Pop 1980	Pop 1990	Pop 2000	Pop 2010	Pop 2020	% 1980	% 1990	% 2000	% 2010	% 2020
White alone (NH)	59,740	67,775	64,581	60,249	56,205	89.51%	84.35%	74.86%	68.59%	61.36%
Black or African American alone (NH)	334	482	471	544	607	0.50%	0.60%	0.55%	0.62%	0.66%
Native American or Alaska Native alone (NH)	2,375	2,900	3,438	3,486	3,528	3.56%	3.61%	3.99%	3.97%	3.85%
Asian alone (NH)	455	866	1,006	1,402	1,730	0.68%	1.08%	1.17%	1.60%	1.89%
Native Hawaiian or Pacific Islander alone (NH)	x	x	107	92	110	0.12%	0.10%	0.12%	0.10%	0.12%
Other race alone (NH)	146	74	152	131	592	0.22%	0.09%	0.18%	0.15%	0.65%
Mixed race or Multiracial (NH)	x	x	2,297	2,432	4,896	x	x	2.66%	2.77%	5.34%
Hispanic or Latino (any race)	3,688	8,248	14,213	19,505	23,933	5.53%	10.27%	16.48%	22.20%	26.13%
Total	66,738	80,345	86,265	87,841	91,601	100.00%	100.00%	100.00%	100.00%	100.00%

=== American Community Survey 2025 data ===
The United States Census Bureau estimated that in 2025, Mendocino County’s population was 88.122. It was also estimated that the county's population was 59,36% Non-Hispanic White, 29,57% Hispanic or Latino, 0,71% Non-Hispanic Black, 2,27% Asian, 3,81% Native American, 0,16% Pacific Islander, and 4,12% Multiracial.

Total	Population	Percentage
Non-Hispanic White	52.309	59,36%
Hispanic or Latino	26.059	29,57%
Non-Hispanic Black	626	0,71%
Asian	2.000	2,27%
Native American	3.356	3,81%
Pacific Islander	140	0,16%
Non-Hispanic Multiracial	3.632	4,12%

=== 2010 census ===
The 2010 United States census reported that Mendocino County had a population of 87,841. The racial makeup of Mendocino County was 67,218 (76.5%) White, 622 (0.7%) African American, 4,277 (4.9%) Native American, 1,450 (1.7%) Asian, 119 (0.1%) Pacific Islander, 10,185 (11.6%) from other races, and 3,970 (4.5%) from two or more races. Hispanic or Latino of any race were 19,505 persons (22.2%).

Population reported at 2010 United States census
The County	Total; Population	White	African; American	Native; American	Asian	Pacific; Islander	other races	two or more races	Hispanic or Latino (of any race)
Mendocino County	87,841	67,218	622	4,277	1,450	119	10,185	3,970	19,505
Incorporated city	Total; Population	White	African; American	Native; American	Asian	Pacific; Islander	other races	two or more races	Hispanic or Latino (of any race)
Fort Bragg	7,273	5,439	51	160	108	14	1,165	336	2,313
Point Arena	449	305	2	1	0	0	118	23	150
Ukiah	16,075	11,592	174	601	412	34	2,385	877	4,458
Willits	4,888	3,862	34	216	68	5	479	224	1,008
Census-designated place	Total; Population	White	African; American	Native; American	Asian	Pacific; Islander	other races	two or more races	Hispanic or Latino (of any race)
Albion	168	150	1	4	5	0	0	8	4
Anchor Bay	340	301	2	5	2	1	12	17	29
Boonville	1,035	630	9	18	7	2	340	29	520
Brooktrails	3,235	2,818	22	87	26	4	109	169	329
Calpella	679	465	3	25	3	0	145	38	256
Caspar	509	474	3	0	8	0	3	21	15
Cleone	618	518	1	3	3	0	79	14	124
Comptche	159	146	0	1	1	0	5	6	10
Covelo	1,255	611	14	475	10	0	49	96	163
Hopland	756	521	4	38	10	0	142	41	263
Laytonville	1,227	839	16	244	10	1	60	57	141
Leggett	122	101	0	3	0	0	0	18	4
Little River	117	113	0	1	0	0	0	3	2
Manchester	195	151	0	4	1	0	29	10	48
Mendocino	894	834	5	8	13	1	6	27	42
Philo	349	171	2	4	5	0	157	10	204
Potter Valley	646	516	2	13	2	0	97	16	154
Redwood Valley	1,729	1,432	7	63	10	1	155	61	305
Talmage	1,130	503	3	27	273	4	278	42	366
Other unincorporated areas	Total; Population	White	African; American	Native; American	Asian	Pacific; Islander	other races	two or more races	Hispanic or Latino (of any race)
All others not CDPs (combined)	48,881	38,588	301	2,492	541	57	4,851	2,051	9,605

=== 2000 census ===
As of the census of 2000, there were 86,265 people, 33,266 households, and 21,855 families residing in the county. The population density was 25 people per square mile (9.7 people/km^{2}). There were 36,937 housing units at an average density of 10 units per square mile (3.9 units/km^{2}). The racial makeup of the county was 80.8% White, 0.6% Black or African American, 4.8% Native American, 1.2% Asian, 0.2% Pacific Islander, 8.6% from other races, and 3.9% from two or more races. 16.5% of the population were Hispanic or Latino of any race. 12.2% were of German, 10.8% English, 8.6% Irish, 6.1% Italian and 5.6% American ancestry according to Census 2000. 84.4% spoke English and 13.2% Spanish as their first language.

There were 33,266 households, out of which 31.4% had children under the age of 18 living with them, 48.9% were married couples living together, 11.7% had a female householder with no husband present, and 34.3% were non-families. 27.0% of all households were made up of individuals, and 10.4% had someone living alone who was 65 years of age or older. The average household size was 2.53 and the average family size was 3.04.

In the county, the population was spread out, with 25.5% under the age of 18, 8.1% from 18 to 24, 25.6% from 25 to 44, 27.1% from 45 to 64, and 13.6% who were 65 years of age or older. The median age was 39 years. For every 100 females there were 98.9 males. For every 100 females age 18 and over, there were 97.1 males.

The median income for a household in the county was $35,996, and the median income for a family was $42,168. Males had a median income of $33,128 versus $23,774 for females. The per capita income for the county was $19,443. About 10.9% of families and 15.9% of the population were below the poverty line, including 21.5% of those under age 18 and 7.7% of those age 65 or over.

== Government ==
As of 2026, the District Attorney of Mendocino County is C. David Eyster, the elected Sheriff-Coroner is Matthew C. Kendall and the interim chief executive officer is Sara Pierce.

Mendocino County is legislatively governed by a board of five supervisors, each with a separate district. The first district is represented by Madeline Cline, and serves the central-eastern region of the county, including Potter Valley, Redwood Valley, Calpella, Talmage, and Hopland. The second district, represented by Maureen Mulheren, who previously served on the Ukiah City Council, serves Ukiah. The third district, in the northeastern quadrant of the county from Willits north to Laytonville and Covelo, is represented by John Haschak. The fourth district covers the northwestern quadrant of the county, including the coast from Caspar northwards through Fort Bragg and over to Leggett; its supervisor is Bernie Norvell, who previously served as the Mayor of Fort Bragg. The supervisor for the fifth district is Ted Williams; his district covers the southern portion of the county, including the coast from Mendocino to Gualala, the Anderson Valley, and the western outskirts of Ukiah.

== Politics ==
=== Voter registration statistics ===
Population and registered voters
Total population	91,601	
Registered voters (Note: Percentage of registered voters with respect to total population. Percentages of party members with respect to registered voters follow.)	54,226	59.2%
Democratic	24,888	45.9%
Republican	12,785	23.6%
Democratic–Republican spread	+12,103	+22.3%
American Independent	2,883	5.3%
Green	775	1.4%
Libertarian	765	1.4%
Peace and Freedom	430	0.8%
Unknown	147	0.3%
Other	85	0.2%
No party preference	11,468	21.1%

==== Cities by population and voter registration ====
Cities by population and voter registration
City	Population	Registered voters	Democratic	Republican	D–R spread	No party preference
Cities by population and voter registration
Fort Bragg	6,983	57.2%	51.7%	21.2%	+30.5%	20.7%
Point Arena	460	60.9%	55%	9.6%	+45.4%	15.7%
Ukiah	16,607	54.6%	45.3%	23.3%	+22%	22.7%
Willits	4,988	57.8%	42.7%	24.6%	+18.1%	21.8%

=== Overview ===
Mendocino is a strongly Democratic county in presidential and congressional elections. The last Republican to win a majority in the county was Californian Ronald Reagan in 1984. However, in the 2016 election, Mendocino County gave Hillary Clinton a reduced margin of victory of any Democrat since Al Gore (though support for third-party candidates more than doubled from 2012). In 2020 the county was won by Joe Biden with an increased margin of victory from the previous election.

United States presidential election results for Mendocino County, California (Note: This total comprised 2,237 votes for Progressive Theodore Roosevelt (who was official Republican nominee in California), 752 votes for Socialist Eugene V. Debs and 141 votes for Prohibition Party nominee Eugene W. Chafin.)
Year	Republican		Democratic		Third party(ies)	
Year	No.	%	No.	%	No.	%
1880	969	42.31%	1,313	57.34%	8	0.35%
1884	1,317	43.71%	1,589	52.74%	107	3.55%
1888	1,708	44.75%	2,005	52.53%	104	2.72%
1892	1,709	41.87%	2,023	49.56%	350	8.57%
1896	2,093	48.92%	2,120	49.56%	65	1.52%
1900	2,192	53.15%	1,861	45.13%	71	1.72%
1904	2,904	61.55%	1,489	31.56%	325	6.89%
1908	2,746	55.56%	1,752	35.45%	444	8.98%
1912	11	0.19%	2,507	44.39%	3,130	55.42%
1916	3,494	46.79%	3,371	45.14%	603	8.07%
1920	4,443	65.83%	1,789	26.51%	517	7.66%
1924	3,465	56.46%	739	12.04%	1,933	31.50%
1928	4,810	63.39%	2,628	34.63%	150	1.98%
1932	3,365	35.23%	5,867	61.43%	319	3.34%
1936	3,670	35.75%	6,432	62.65%	164	1.60%
1940	5,345	42.53%	7,055	56.13%	169	1.34%
1944	4,655	45.89%	5,452	53.75%	36	0.35%
1948	6,368	50.53%	5,553	44.06%	682	5.41%
1952	10,897	60.87%	6,813	38.06%	191	1.07%
1956	10,327	56.94%	7,767	42.82%	43	0.24%
1960	9,301	49.29%	9,476	50.21%	94	0.50%
1964	6,322	34.68%	11,869	65.12%	36	0.20%
1968	8,305	46.39%	7,935	44.32%	1,664	9.29%
1972	11,128	51.01%	9,435	43.25%	1,251	5.73%
1976	9,784	45.49%	10,653	49.53%	1,072	4.98%
1980	12,432	44.05%	10,784	38.21%	5,008	17.74%
1984	16,369	52.09%	14,407	45.85%	646	2.06%
1988	12,979	41.94%	17,152	55.42%	816	2.64%
1992	7,958	21.78%	18,344	50.21%	10,236	28.01%
1996	9,765	29.87%	14,952	45.74%	7,975	24.39%
2000	12,272	35.66%	16,634	48.34%	5,504	16.00%
2004	12,955	33.71%	24,385	63.45%	1,089	2.83%
2008	10,721	26.79%	27,843	69.58%	1,452	3.63%
2012	9,658	27.58%	23,193	66.23%	2,166	6.19%
2016	10,888	29.05%	22,079	58.91%	4,510	12.03%
2020	13,267	30.61%	28,782	66.41%	1,291	2.98%
2024	13,528	34.49%	24,049	61.32%	1,642	4.19%

Federally, Mendocino County is in California's 2nd congressional district, represented by Democrat Jared Huffman.

In the state legislature Mendocino is in the 2nd senatorial district, represented by Democrat Mike McGuire, and the 2nd Assembly district, represented by Democrat Chris Rogers.

As of November 2025, the Mendocino County Clerk reports that Mendocino County has 53,936 registered voters. Of those, 25,192 (46.9%) are registered Democratic; 12,544 (23.4%) are registered Republican; 4,788 (8.1%) are registered with other political parties, and 11,145 (20.8%) declined to state a political party.

In 2000, Mendocino County voters approved Measure G, which calls for the decriminalization of marijuana when used and cultivated for personal use. Measure G passed with a 58% majority vote, making it the first county in the United States to declare prosecution of small-scale marijuana offenses the "lowest priority" for local law enforcement. Measure G does not protect individuals who cultivate, transport or possess marijuana for sale. However, Measure G was passed at the local government level affecting only Mendocino County, and therefore does not affect existing state or federal laws. The city of Berkeley has had a similar law (known as the Berkeley Marijuana Initiative II) since 1979 which has generally been found to be unenforceable.

In 2008, the Mendocino County Board of Supervisors placed Measure B on the June 3 county-wide ballot. After three months of hard-fought campaigning and national attention, voters narrowly approved "B", which repealed the provisions of 2000's Measure G. However, opponents of Measure B intend to continue the challenge in court, as the wording of Measure B relies heavily on S.B. 420's state limitations which were recently ruled unconstitutional by the California supreme court. On July 3, the Sheriff and District Attorneys offices announced that they would not be enforcing the new regulations for the time being, citing pending legal challenges and conflicts with existing state law.

In April 2009, Sheriff Tom Allman issued his department's medical marijuana enforcement policy, which includes the provisions of Measure B and also cites the California Supreme Court Ruling narrowly defining "caregiver" in the state's medical marijuana law.

In 2004, Measure H was passed in Mendocino County with a 56% majority, making it the first county in the United States to ban the production and cultivation of genetically modified organisms.

On November 4, 2008, Mendocino County voted 63.1% against Proposition 8 which amended the California Constitution to define marriage as a union between one man and one woman.

== Crime ==
The following table includes the number of incidents reported and the rate per 1,000 persons for each type of offense.

Population and crime rates
Population	87,525	
Violent crime	520	5.94
Homicide	5	0.06
Forcible rape	31	0.35
Robbery	46	0.53
Aggravated assault	438	5.00
Property crime	777	8.88
Burglary	469	5.36
Larceny-theft	792	9.05
Motor vehicle theft	99	1.13
Arson	22	0.25

=== Cities by population and crime rates ===
Cities by population and crime rates
City	Population	Violent crimes	Violent crime rate per 1,000 persons	Property crimes	Property crime rate per 1,000 persons
Fort Bragg	7,317	34	4.65	367	50.16
Ukiah	16,172	108	6.68	481	29.74
Willits	4,917	32	6.51	71	14.44

A coroner's jury ruled that the 2018 Hart family crash in Mendocino County was deliberate.

== Media ==
Mendocino County is considered part of the San Francisco Bay Area television market, and primarily receives the major Bay Area TV stations.

The county is also served by local and regional newspapers as well as a community radio stations. Community radio stations include KZYX, operating out of Philo, and KLLG, operating out of the Little Lake Grange in Willits. The Humboldt County-based KMUD is also receivable in large parts of the county. Local independent newspapers include the online news service The Mendocino Voice, and The Laytonville Observer, the Anderson Valley Advertiser, the Willits Weekly and the Independent Coast Observer. Four formerly independent newspapers are now owned by the national conglomerate media company Digital First Media; they are: The Ukiah Daily Journal, The Mendocino Beacon, the Willits News, and The Fort Bragg Advocate-News. These four papers have seen a precipitous decline in the size of editorial staff and in coverage over the past several years, in keeping with the nationwide tactics of DFM. The Sonoma County-based Press Democrat also covers the area.

== Education ==
=== Community colleges ===
- Mendocino College:
  - Main campus, Ukiah
  - North County Center, Willits
  - Coast Center, Fort Bragg
- Pacific Union College's Albion Biological Field Station

=== Universities ===
- Dharma Realm Buddhist University

=== K-12 education ===
School districts include:

Unified:

- Anderson Valley Unified School District
- Fort Bragg Unified School District
- Laytonville Unified School District
- Leggett Valley Unified School District
- Mendocino Unified School District
- Potter Valley Community Unified School District
- Round Valley Unified School District
- Southern Humboldt Joint Unified School District
- Ukiah Unified School District
- Willits Unified School District

Secondary:

- Point Arena Joint Union High School District

Elementary:

- Arena Union Elementary School District
- Manchester Union Elementary School District

== Transportation ==
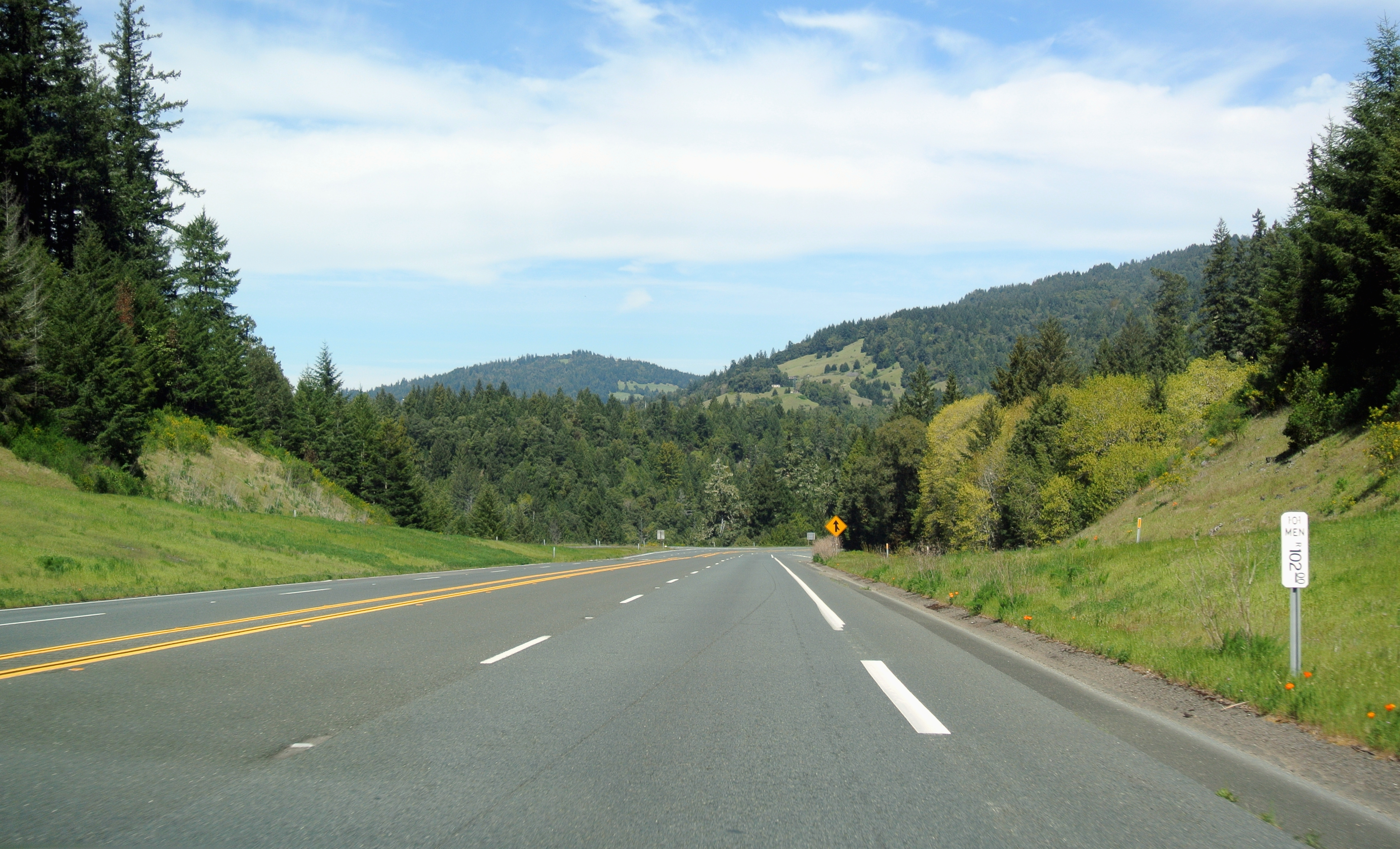
US 101 in Mendocino County

=== Major highways ===
- State Route 1
- U.S. Route 101
- State Route 20
- State Route 128
- State Route 162
- State Route 175
- State Route 222 (unsigned)
- State Route 253
- State Route 271

=== Public transportation ===
==== Bus ====
The Mendocino Transit Authority provides local and intercity bus service within Mendocino County. Limited service also connects with transit in Sonoma County. Greyhound Bus Lines currently serves Ukiah.

Amtrak Thruway operates connecting bus service to Ukiah, Willits and Laytonville.

The historic Skunk Train is a heritage railway (that formerly connected Fort Bragg, California with Willits) using steam locomotives.

=== Airports ===
- Ukiah Municipal Airport is a general aviation airport owned by the City of Ukiah. It is located south of downtown Ukiah.
- Little River Airport is a general aviation airport serving the Mendocino coast.
- Willits Municipal Airport is a general aviation airport serving the Willits / Little Lake Valley area. Located in the Brooktrails subdivision area west of Willits.
- Round Valley Airport is a general aviation airport serving the Covelo / Round Valley area.
- Boonville Airport (California) is a general aviation airport serving the Boonville / Anderson Valley area.
- Ocean Ridge Airport is a privately owned general aviation airport serving the Gualala area.

For commercial service, passengers in Mendocino County need to go to Eureka, one county to the north in Humboldt County, or to Sonoma County Airport in Santa Rosa, Sonoma County, one county to the south. More comprehensive service is available from Sacramento to the east or San Francisco, well to the south.

Emergency services for the largely unincorporated county are coordinated through Howard Forest Station, a local Cal Fire station just south of Willits.

== Communities ==
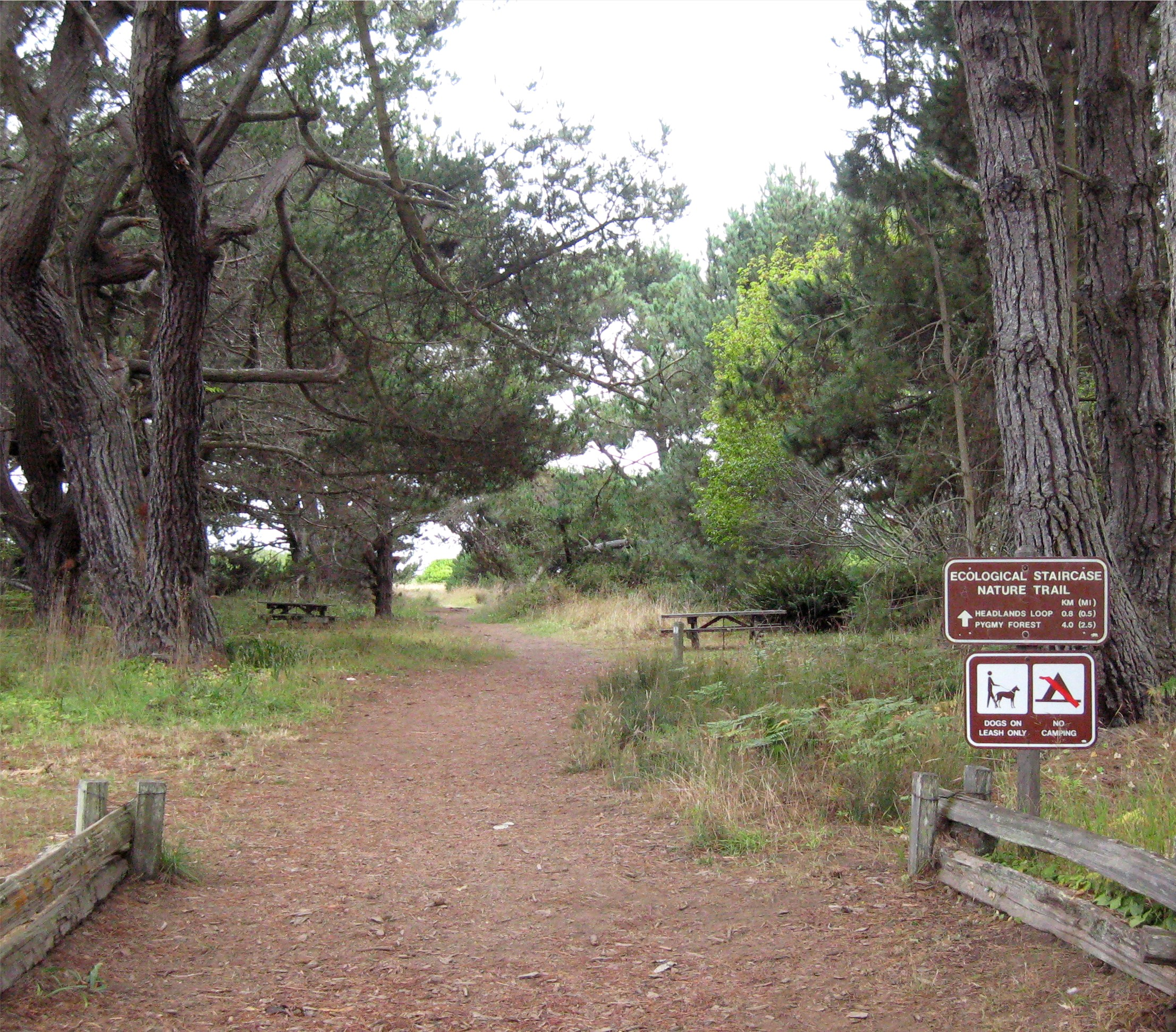
Ecological staircase trail in Jug Handle State Nature Reserve

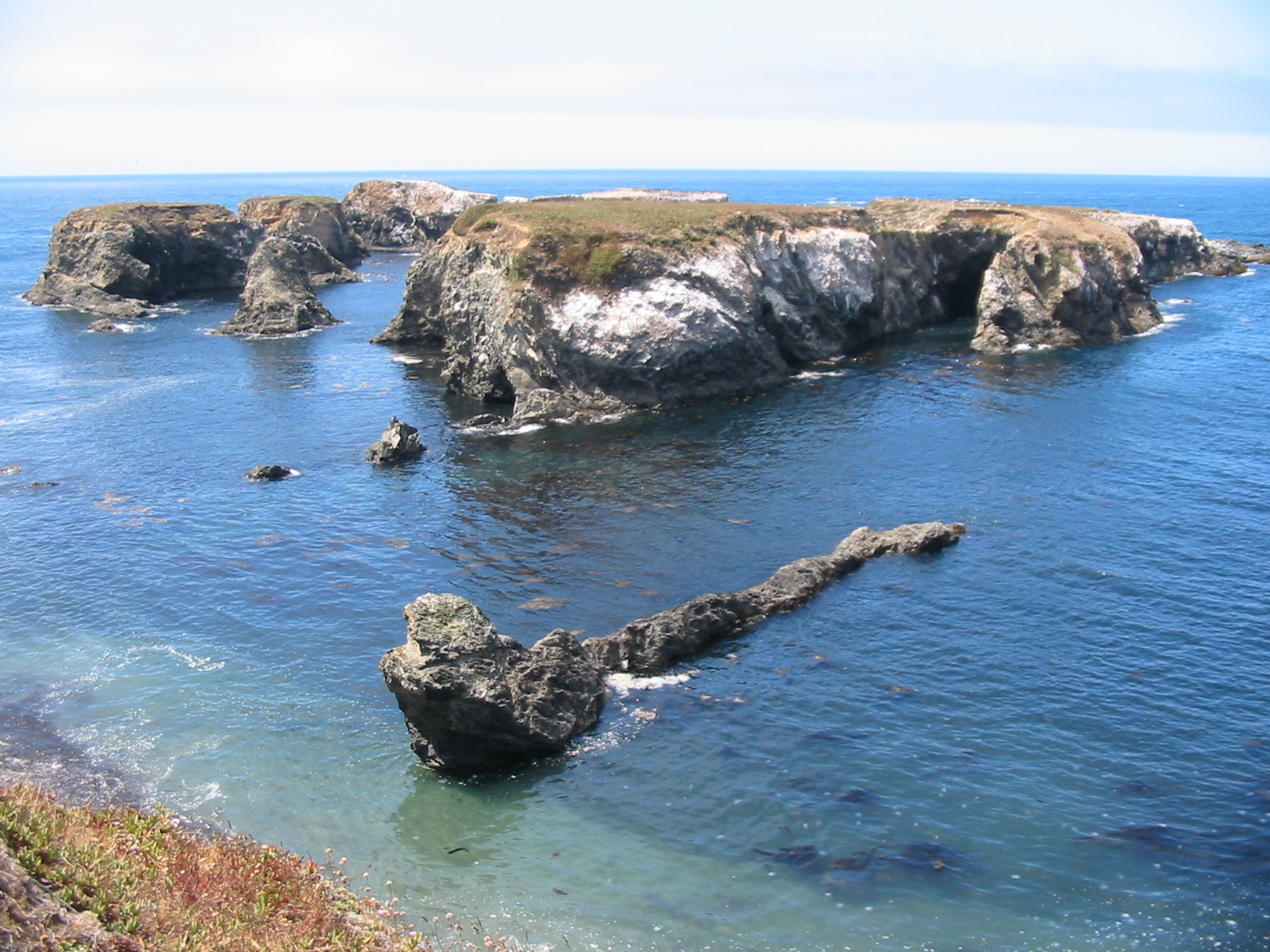
Islands off the Mendocino coast

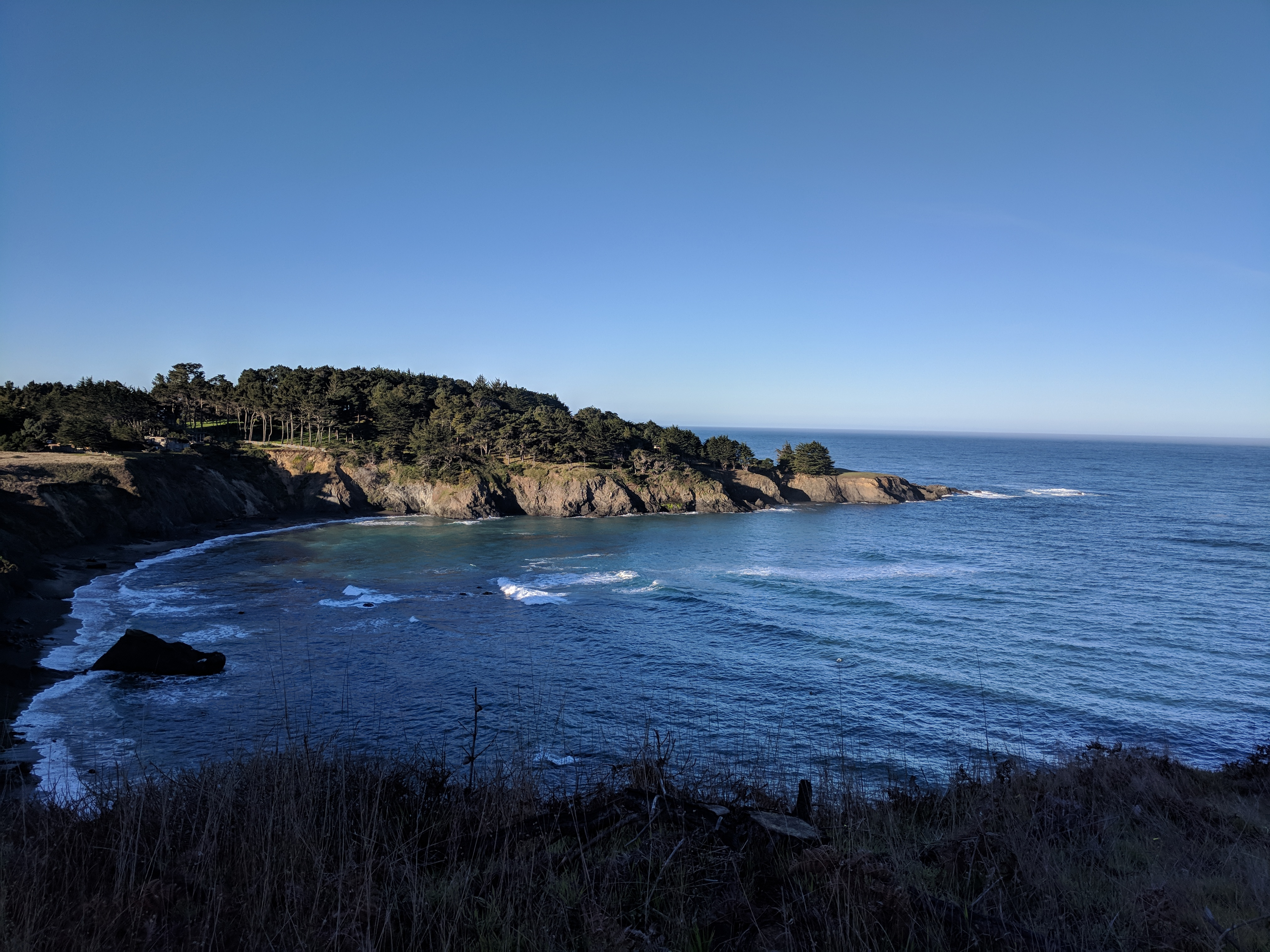
Mendocino Grove

=== Cities ===
- Fort Bragg
- Point Arena
- Ukiah (county seat)
- Willits

=== Census-designated places ===
- Albion
- Anchor Bay
- Boonville
- Brooktrails
- Calpella
- Caspar
- Cleone
- Comptche
- Covelo
- Hopland (formerly Sanel)
- Laytonville
- Leggett
- Little River
- Manchester
- Mendocino
- Philo
- Potter Valley
- Redwood Valley
- Talmage

=== Unincorporated communities ===
- Branscomb
- Dos Rios
- Elk
- Gualala
- Inglenook
- Longvale
- Navarro
- Noyo
- Old Hopland
- Piercy
- Pine Grove
- Rockport
- Wanhala
- Westport
- Yorkville

=== Indian reservations ===
Mendocino County has nine Indian reservations lying within its borders, the fourth-most of any county in the United States (after San Diego County, California; Sandoval County, New Mexico; and Riverside County, California).

- Coyote Valley Reservation
- Guidiville Rancheria
- Hopland Rancheria
- Laytonville Rancheria
- Manchester-Point Arena Rancheria
- Pinoleville Rancheria
- Redwood Valley Rancheria
- Round Valley Reservation (partly in Trinity County)
- Sherwood Valley Rancheria

=== Population ranking ===
The population ranking of the following table is based on the 2010 Census and 2020 Census data for Mendocino County.

† county seat

Rank	City/Town/etc.	Municipal type	Population (2010 Census)	Population (2020 Census)
1	† Ukiah	City	16,075	16,607
2	Fort Bragg	City	7,273	6,983
3	Willits	City	4,888	4,988
4	Brooktrails	CDP	3,235	3,632
5	Redwood Valley	CDP	1,729	1,843
6	Covelo	CDP	1,255	1,394
7	Laytonville	CDP	1,227	1,152
9	Talmage	CDP	1,130	986
8	Boonville	CDP	1,035	1,018
10	Mendocino	CDP	894	932
13	Hopland	CDP	756	661
11	Calpella	CDP	679	799
12	Potter Valley	CDP	646	665
14	Cleone	CDP	618	622
15	Caspar	CDP	509	500
17	Point Arena	City	449	460
18	Round Valley Reservation (partially in Trinity County)	AIAN	401	456
19	Philo	CDP	349	319
16	Anchor Bay	CDP	340	473
21	Redwood Valley Rancheria	AIAN	238	238
25	Laytonville Rancheria	AIAN	212	155
22	Manchester-Point Arena Rancheria	AIAN	212	188
24	Manchester	CDP	195	159
26	Albion	CDP	168	153
29	Sherwood Valley Rancheria	AIAN	168	119
23	Comptche	CDP	159	167
28	Coyote Valley Reservation	AIAN	144	127
27	Pinoleville Rancheria	AIAN	129	142
31	Leggett	CDP	122	77
30	Little River	CDP	117	94
32	Guidiville Rancheria	AIAN	52	50
20	Hopland Rancheria (Pomo Indians)	AIAN	38	253

== In popular culture ==
"Mendocino" by the Sir Douglas Quintet was released in December 1968 and reached number 27 in the U.S. Billboard Hot 100 by early 1969, spending 15 weeks on the chart.

Kate McGarrigle's song "(Talk to Me of) Mendocino" is one of the songs on the McGarrigles' 1975 debut album; it has been covered by Linda Ronstadt on her 1982 album Get Closer, by English singer-songwriter John Howard on his 2007 EP, and by Bette Midler on her 2014 album It's the Girls.

A song written by Matt Serletic and Bernie Taupin, "Mendocino County Line", which was released in 2002, is about a love that could not last and cites the Mendocino County Line in the chorus.

Many films and movies have been filmed in and around Mendocino County, including Dying Young, The Russians Are Coming, Overboard, The Dunwich Horror, The Karate Kid Part III, Dead & Buried, Forever Young, Same Time Next Year, Racing with the Moon, Pontiac Moon, and The Majestic.

== See also ==
- National Register of Historic Places listings in Mendocino County, California
- California Historical Landmarks in Mendocino County, California
- Sequoia County, California
