= Oak Fire (2020) =

2020 wildfire in Northern California

- Part of the 2020 California wildfires
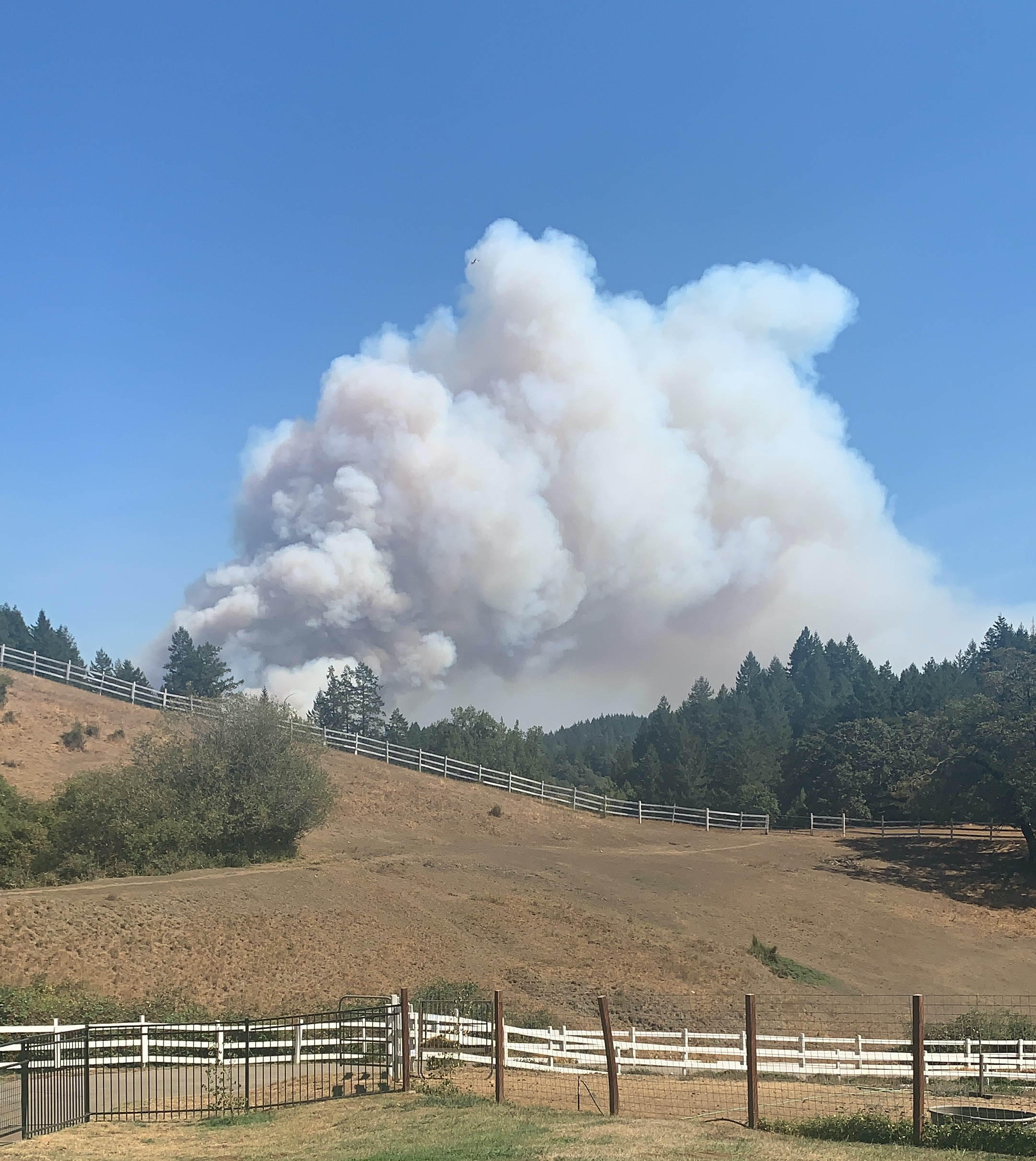
- Oak Fire from Brooktrails on September 7, 2020
- Date: September 7, 2020 –; September 14, 2020
- Location: Brooktrails, Mendocino County, California, United States
- Coordinates: 39.4935°N 123.3965°W

Statistics
- Burned area: 1,100 acres (445 ha)
- Land use: Residential

Impacts
- Evacuated: 3,200
- Structures lost: 56 structures destroyed; 1 structures damaged
- Cost: $2,100,000

Ignition
- Cause: Under investigation

Map
- Location of Oak Fire in California

The Oak Fire was a wildfire that burned north of Brooktrails in Mendocino County, California in the United States. The fire was first reported on September 7, 2020, and was contained on September 14, 2020. It burned 1,100 acres (445 ha). The fire resulted in the evacuation of over 3,200 people just north of the city of Willits. It damaged 1 and destroyed 56 structures. The cause of the fire remains under investigation.

== Events ==
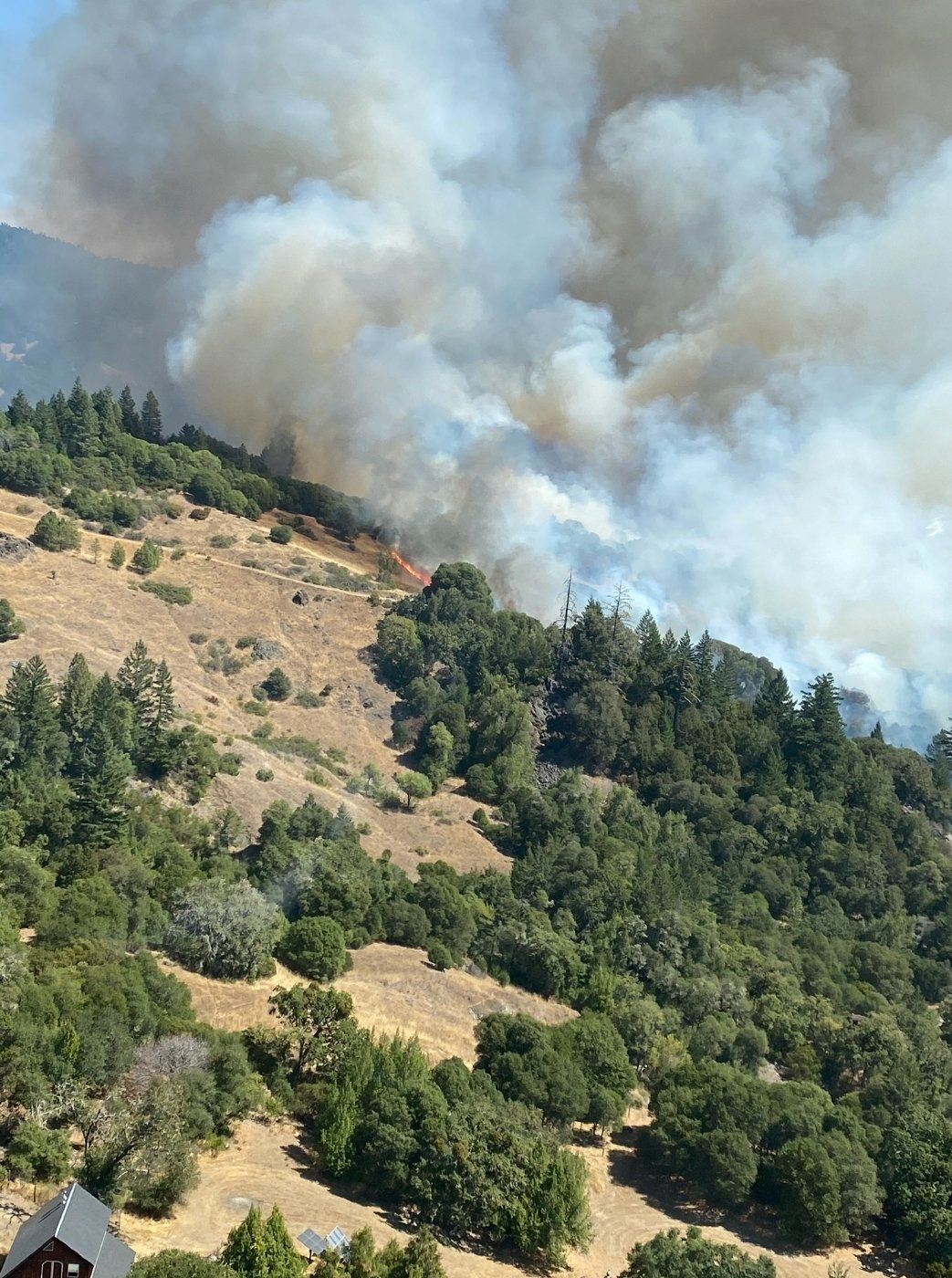
Oak Fire in Brooktrails on September 7.

The Oak Fire was first reported at 12:16 PM on September 7, 2020, burning in near Big John Rd. and Skyview Rd. north of Brooktrails near Willits. Residents reported hearing and feeling explosions around the time of the fire being reported. Burning in a mix of grass, brush, oak and conifer, the fire began spreading in the residential area and mandatory evacuations were put in place for the entire Brooktrails community and surrounding roads, impacting over 3,200 people. Willits High School was named an evacuation center. That evening, the fire had grown to 700 acres (283 ha), moving northwards. The fire crossed U.S. Route 101 that night but was quelled quickly. More evacuations were announced for remaining unevacuated areas of Brooktrails and Baechtel Grove Middle School was opened as a second evacuation center.

The next day, September 8, evacuations remained in place and the Willits and Laytonville school districts were closed. Crews focused on fire suppression and building containment lines in anticipation of a red flag warning anticipated to last until the following morning. As of that evening, the fire had burned 863 acres (349 ha) and was ten percent contained. Damage inspection began on September 9, with the fire at 25 percent containment. A large smoke cloud laying atop the region, due to the many fires burning in Northern California, helped quell fire activity. Highway 101 was opened in the evening.

Evacuation orders were lifted for the majority of Brooktrails, with the exception of the highest impact areas in the heart of the fire zone. Better mapping led to an increase in the reported acreage burned at 1,100 acres (445 ha). Cal Fire acknowledged that lessons learned from the 2020 Redwood Valley Fire, which killed 9 people, helped ensure that the Oak Fire was quickly quelled and had a smaller impact.

== Impact ==
The Oak Fire resulted in the mandatory evacuations of over 3,200 people in the Brooktrails community adjacent to Willits on September 7. The majority of residents were allowed to return four days later, on September 10. The fire threatened and eventually crossed Highway 101, resulting in the highway's closure starting September 7. The highway re-opened on September 9. Willits High School and Baechtel Grove Middle School are serving as evacuation centers. Hotels, RV parks and campgrounds in Mendocino County were filled to capacity by the morning of September 8 with evacuees. The fire damaged 1 structure and destroyed 56.

The poor air quality and widespread evacuations led to Willits Unified School District, Laytonville Unified School District and Mendocino College's Willits campus canceling classes for the week.
