= MacKerricher State Park =

State park in California, United States

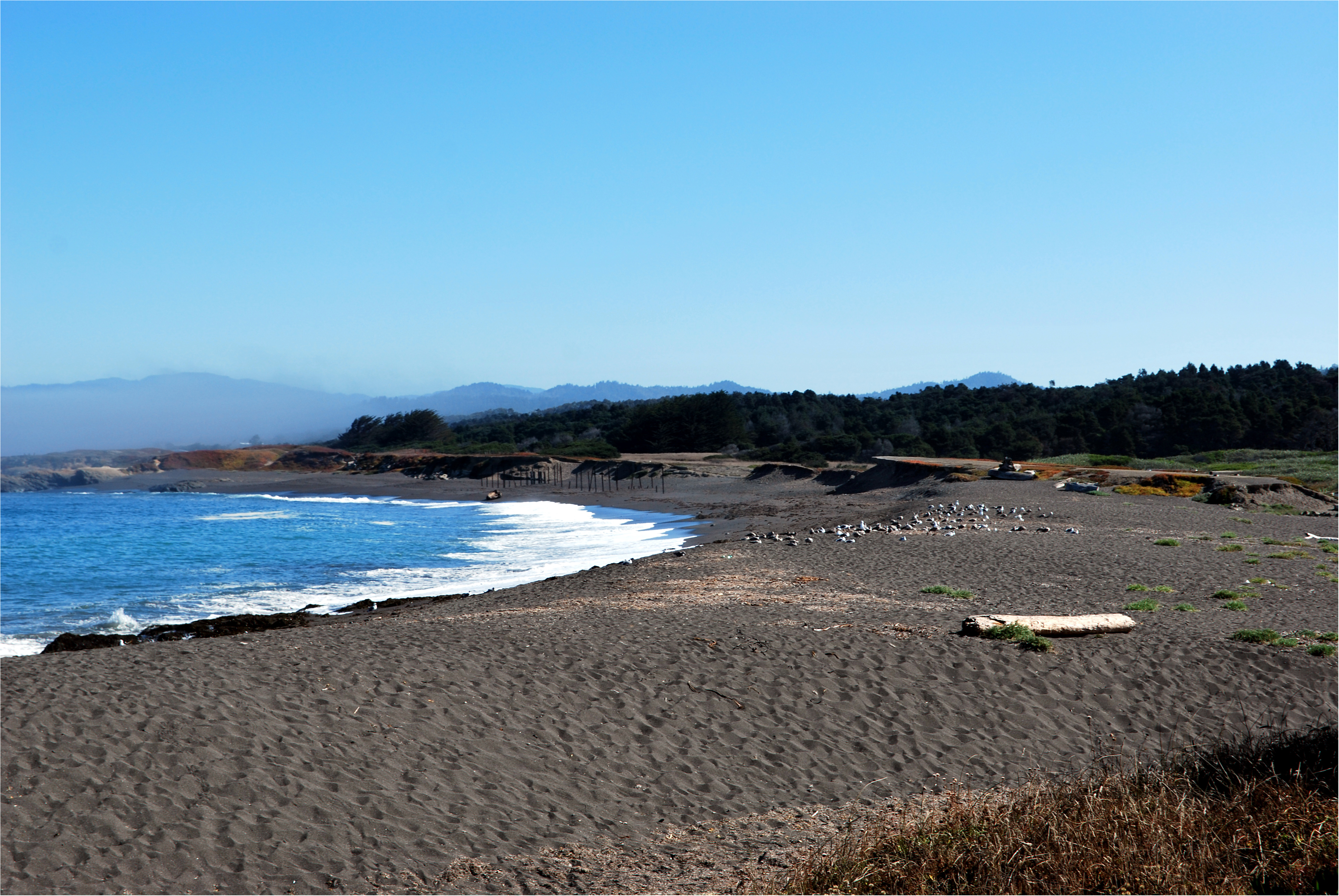

- Location within California Location within the United States
- Location: Mendocino County, California
- Nearest city: Fort Bragg, California
- Coordinates: 39°29′36″N 123°47′37″W
- Area: 2,299 acres (930 ha)
- Established: 1952
- Governing body: California Department of Parks and Recreation

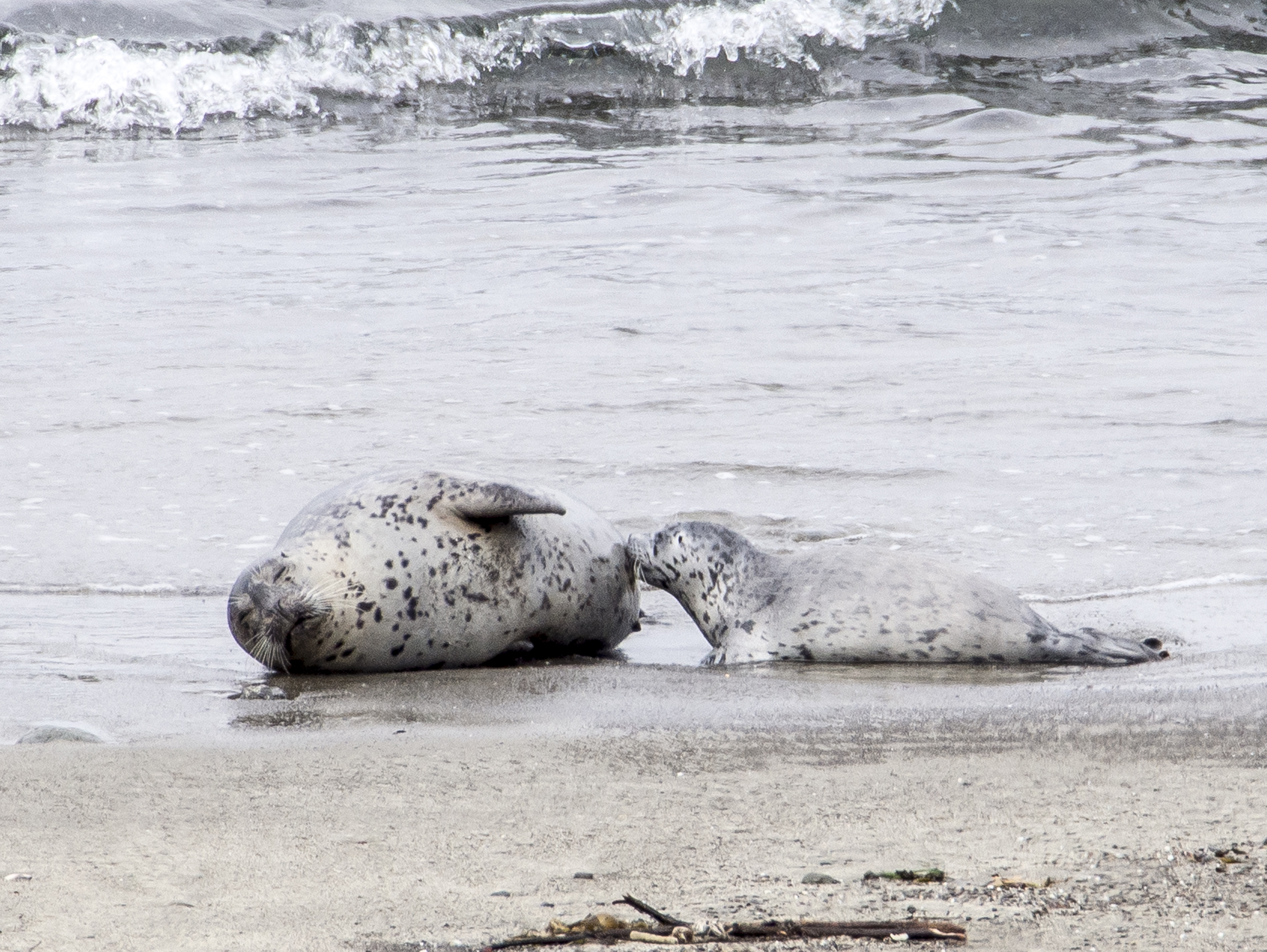
Harbor seal nursing her pup on MacKerricher Beach

MacKerricher State Park is a state park in California in the United States. It is located 3 miles (4.8 km) north of Fort Bragg in Mendocino County. It covers 9 miles (14 km) of coastline and contains several types of coastal habitat, including beaches, dunes, headlands, coves, wetlands, tide pools, forest, and a freshwater lake.

== Natural features ==
The northern coastline of the park is a long, sloping beach, and the southern section is made up of rocky cliffs and flats separating smaller strips of beach. Inland from the ocean is Lake Cleone, a former brackish marsh that was closed off by the construction of a road and became a 30-acre (12 ha) freshwater lake. Much of the northern section of the park is occupied by the Inglenook Fen Ten Mile Dunes Preserve, a sensitive dune complex with wetland and terrestrial vegetation zones. Laguna Point is a peninsula near the middle of the park. The Ten Mile River marks the upper boundary of the park, and several creeks drain run through the landscape and into the Pacific Ocean.

The headlands are covered in grasses and wildflowers. Wooded areas just inland have stands of bishop pine (Pinus muricata), shore pine (Pinus contorta), and Douglas fir (Pseudotsuga menziesii). The park contains 95% of the entire distribution of the rare Mendocino spineflower (Chorizanthe howellii), which grows in the protected dunes of the Inglenook Preserve. Animals in the area include harbor seals, which haul out on the rocks to sun. Gray whales on their annual migration are visible from shore between December and April, providing whale watching opportunities. Other mammals include black-tailed deer, raccoons, gray foxes, and occasionally mountain lions. There are many forms of tide pool life. There are more than 90 species of birds, including migratory waterfowl and permanent residents such as ospreys, great blue herons, ring-necked ducks, and mallards. The tidewater goby (Eucyclogobius newberryi) is an endangered species of fish that lives in the local creeks and rivers. Some of these waterways were recently designated as critical habitat for the fish, and the park may be expanded to preserve it.

== History ==
Indigenous peoples of California, including the Pomo and Yuki peoples, lived in or traveled through the region, utilizing resources such as seaweed, shellfish, and acorns. The Mendocino Indian Reservation was established in the area. Canadian newlyweds Duncan and Jessie MacKerricher moved to the area in 1864. They hired a staff of native people to work on their ranch, which produced butter, potatoes, and draft horses. In 1916 a logging branch of the California Western Railroad was built northward along the coast from the Union Lumber Company Fort Bragg sawmill to the Ten Mile River and up the middle fork of the river to Camp 6. Trains brought logs from the Ten Mile River to the Fort Bragg sawmill until the rails were replaced by a haul road for logging trucks in 1949, when descendants of Duncan and Jessie MacKerricher sold the MacKerricher property to the state of California, which made it a state park.

== Recreation ==
Parks staff leads hikes and whale-watching ventures. It maintains campgrounds and other facilities. Lake Cleone is available for fishing. There are trails for walking, cycling, and horseback riding. Glass Beach, at the southern end of the park, is famous for its fields of sand-polished glass pebbles. They are remnants of garbage that was piled on the beach when it was used as a dump by area residents in the 1950s and 1960s. After decades of friction in the tides, the discarded, broken glass has been reduced to smooth, attractive trinkets sought by casual collectors.

== MacKerricher Coastal Trail ==
A 4.75 mi (7.64 km) rail trail segment of the California Coastal Trail uses the former railroad grade later converted to a haul road for logging trucks. The southern end of the trail is a timber trestle over Pudding Creek, and the trail parallels the Pacific coast north to Ward Avenue. The 9 mi (14 km) haul road was abandoned when 7,000 ft (2,100 m) of the road's asphalt concrete pavement was washed out by flooding in 1983. The haul road has not been subsequently maintained, and the portion north of the washout is being destroyed by the park as a habitat restoration measure. Leashed dogs are allowed on the paved trail, but excluded from the dune areas to protect the snowy plover.

== See also ==
- List of beaches in California
- List of California state parks
- Virgin Creek, a stream whose mouth is within the park
