= Glass Beach =

Glass Beach may refer to:

- Glass Beach (Benicia, California)
- Glass Beach (Fort Bragg, California)
- Glass Beach (Eleele, Hawaii)
- Glass Beach (band)
