= Beachcombing =

Looking for beach collectables

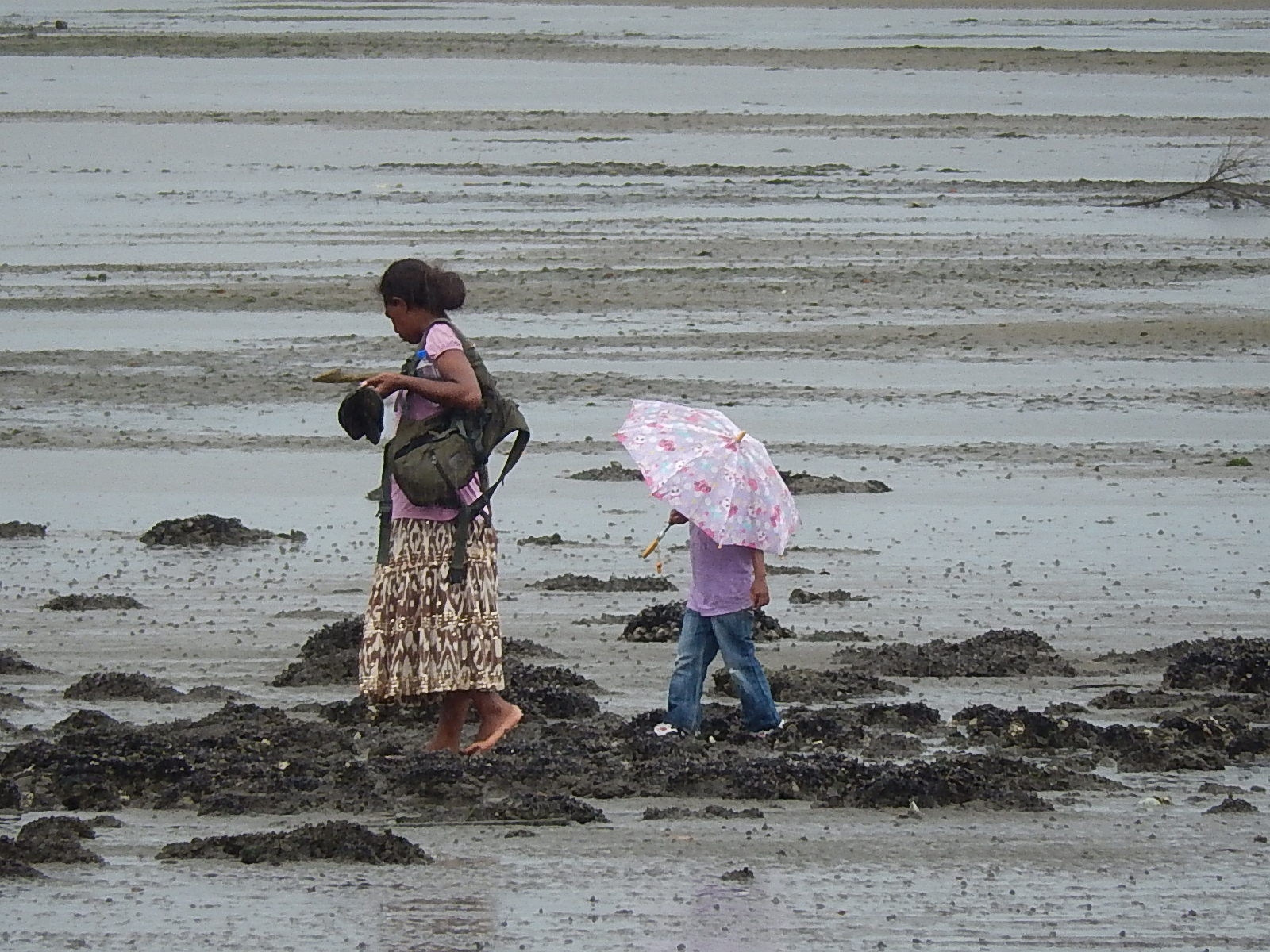
Beachcombing in Suva, Fiji

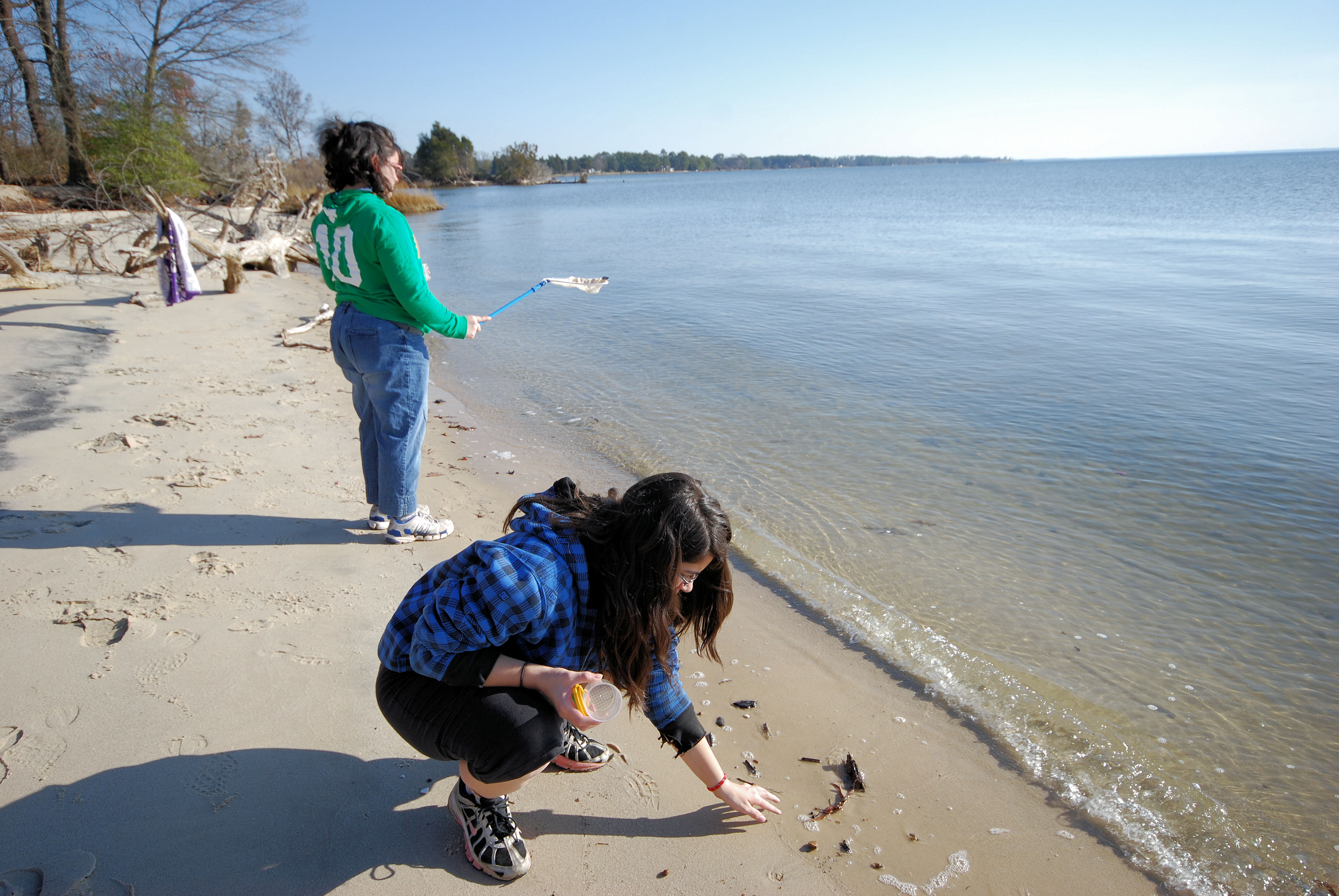
Beachcombing at Belle Isle State Park in Virginia, United States

Beachcombing is an activity that consists of an individual "combing" (or searching) the beach and the intertidal zone, looking for things of value, interest or utility. A beachcomber is a person who participates in the activity of beachcombing.

Despite these general definitions, beachcombing and beachcomber are words with multiple, but related, meanings that have evolved over time.

== Historical usage ==
The first appearance of the word "beachcombers" in print was in Richard Henry Dana Jr.'s Two Years Before the Mast (1840) and later referenced in Herman Melville's Omoo (1847). It described a population of Europeans who lived in South Pacific islands, "combing" the beach and nearby water for flotsam, jetsam, or anything else they could use or trade. When a beachcomber became totally dependent upon coastal fishing for his sustenance, or abandoned his original culture and set of values ("went native"), then the term "beachcomber" was synonymous with a criminal, a drifter, or a bum. While the vast majority of beachcombers were simply unemployed sailors, many may have chosen to live in Pacific island communities; as described by Herman Melville in Typee, or Harry Franck in the book Vagabonding Around the World.

After enduring a voyage of danger and hardship, it was not uncommon for a few sailors to desert a whaling ship when it arrived in Tahiti or the Marquesas and reside, at least for a while, in the South Sea islands of Polynesia. If another beachcomber was ready to take his place in order to get home, the captain might let the disgruntled crewman go; otherwise, the captain would offer the natives a reward to find and return the deserter, and deduct the reward, plus interest, from the deserter's pay. In other words, the deserter, if caught, would end up working the entire voyage for no pay at all, or even return home in debt to his employers. In Typee, Melville deserted, not once but twice, before signing on as a crewman on a Navy frigate, without fear of repercussions.

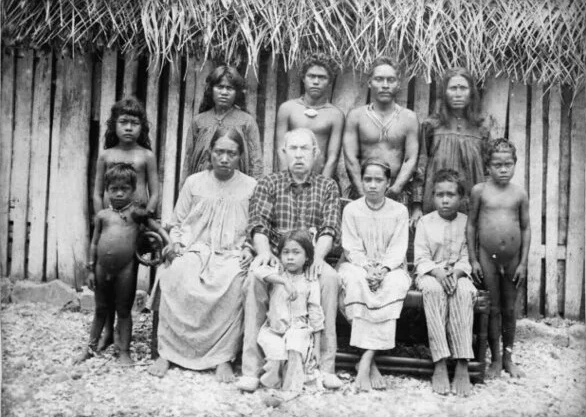
William Harris with his Nauran family, 1887

Some beachcombers traded between local tribes, and between tribes and visiting ships. Charles Savage led a small group of beachcombers as mercenaries in the service of the Bau Island chieftain Naulivou and quickly showed their worth in fights with his enemies. Some lived on the rewards for deserters, or found replacement crewmen either through persuasion or through shanghaiing. Many, such as David Whippy, also served as mediators between hostile native tribes as well as between natives and visiting ships. Whippy deserted his ship in 1820 and lived among the cannibal Fijis for the rest of his life. The Fijis would sometimes capture the crew of a stranded ship for ransom, and eat them if they resisted. Whippy would try to rescue them but sometimes found only roasted bones. Ultimately he became American consul to Fiji, and left many descendants among the islands.

There had always been a small number of castaways in the South Pacific since the earliest Spanish explorers, but the numbers increased dramatically in the early 19th century with the beginning of the whaling era circa 1819. It is estimated that 75% of beachcombers were sailors, particularly whalemen, who had jumped ship. They were predominantly British but with an increasing number of Americans, particularly in Hawaii and the Carolines. Perhaps 20% were English convicts who had been transported to Australia and escaped from the penal colonies there.

It is estimated that in 1850 there were over 2,000 beachcombers throughout Polynesia and Micronesia. The Polynesia and Melanesia communities were usually receptive to beachcombers and castaways who were absorbed into the local community, usually by formal adoption or by marriage, with the beachcombers and castaways often being considered a status symbol of the local chief. Beachcombers who returned to Europe conveyed tattoo styles of the Pacific islands.

The social and commercial role of beachcombers ended when missionaries arrived, and with the growth of a commercial community with European (palagi) traders, resident on each island, who were the representatives of trading companies. Many beachcombers made the transition to becoming island traders.

== Other languages ==
In Uruguay, a similar term has been naturalized into the Spanish form Bichicome. According to folk etymology, the word traces its origins to the English term and refers to poor or lower-class people. The Spanish form also draws on the similarities to the Spanish bicho (small animal/insect) and comer (eat). Similarly, the term has entered the Greek slang through sailors, in the form "pitsikómis" (πιτσικόμης). The Russian word бич (and a rarer form бичкомбер, бичкомер) appeared not later than 1930s, in the sense of temporarily unemployed sailor, hanging about in the port and living from hand to mouth; nowadays it means a vagabond or a hobo.

== Archaeology ==
In archaeology the beachcombing lifestyle is associated with coastal shell-middens that sometimes accumulate over many hundreds if not thousands of years. Evidence at Klasies River Caves in South Africa, and Gulf of Zula in Eritrea, show that a beachcombing option is one of the earliest activities separating anatomically modern human Homo sapiens from the ancestral subspecies of Homo erectus.

== Modern usage ==
Many modern beachcombers follow the "drift lines" or "tide lines" on the beach and are interested in the (mostly natural) objects that the sea casts up. For these people, "beachcombing" is the recreational activity of looking for and finding various curiosities that have washed in with the tide: seashells of every kind, fossils, pottery shards (sea pottery), historical artifacts, sea beans (drift seeds), sea glass (beach glass), driftwood, and messages in bottles. Items such as lumber, plastics, and all manner of things that have been lost or discarded by seagoing vessels will be collected by some beachcombers, as long as the items are either decorative or useful in some way to the collector. (However, this usually does not include the great bulk of marine debris, most of which is neither useful nor decorative.) Edmund James Banfield is an example of the modern beachcomber in his residence on Dunk Island in the early twentieth century where he studied and wrote about the vegetation, bird and sea life of the island.

Sophisticated recreational beachcombers use knowledge of how storms, geography, ocean currents, and seasonal events determine the arrival and exposure of rare finds. They also practice eco-conservation and do not kill mollusks for their shells, dig holes in the sand, or gouge cliff faces for fossils or reefs for coral specimens. Many beachcombers serve as excellent stewards of the seashore, working with government agencies to monitor shore erosion, dumping and pollution, and reef and cliff damage, etc.

Recognized beachcomb experts today include oceanographer Curtis Ebbesmeyer (Flotsametrics and the Floating World); eco-educator Dr. Deacon Ritterbush (A Beachcomber’s Odyssey); sea glass experts Richard LaMotte (Pure Sea Glass) and C.S. Lambert (Sea Glass Chronicles); geologist Margaret Carruthers (Beach Stones); shell specialists Chuck and Debbie Robinson (The Art of Shelling), and zoologist Dr. Blair Witherington and Dawn Witherington, (Florida's Living Beaches: A Guide for the Curious Beachcomber).

=== Log salvage ===
Along the coast of British Columbia in Canada, beachcombing or log salvage is the occupation of retrieving stray logs from the sea for resale to the lumber industry. It has been an activity since the 1880s and is still carried out under licence from the province.

== See also ==
- Drift whale
- Message in a bottle
- Strandloper
- Wrecking (shipwreck)
