= Sea pottery =

Broken pottery found on beaches

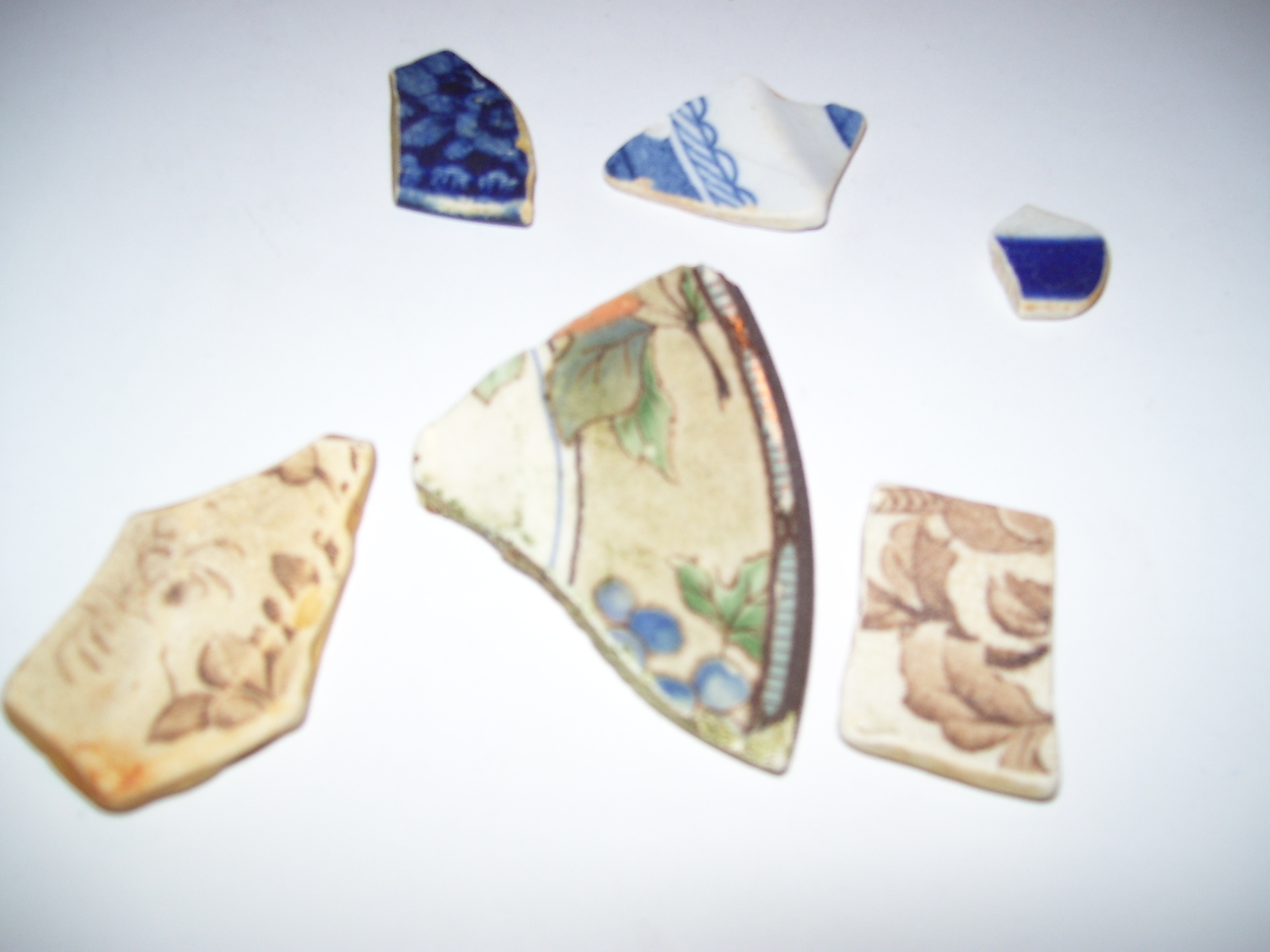
Sea pottery in several colors and patterns featuring flowers and other designs

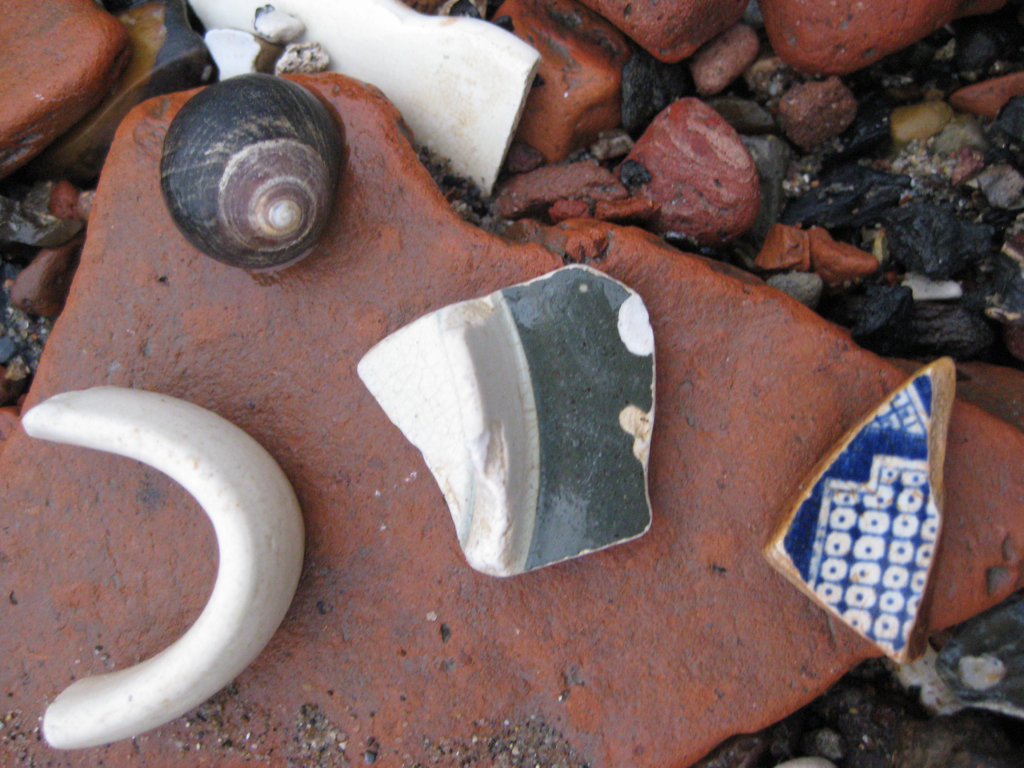
Pottery shards found while mudlarking on the Thames Foreshore

Sea pottery (also known as sea china, sea porcelain or beach pottery) is pottery that is broken into worn pieces and shards and found on beaches along oceans or large lakes. Sea pottery has been tumbled and smoothed by the water and sand, creating small pieces of smooth, frosted pottery. It is often collected with more common sea glass by beachcombers.

== Origins ==
Sea pottery originates from pottery, including earthenware, stoneware and porcelain which breaks into smaller pieces and is smoothed by the acidity and motion of an ocean or lake. The sand or grit polishes the edges like a natural tumbler. Some sea pottery contains discernible patterns, such as flowers, figures, historic places and scenes, or hallmarks, factory stamps and dates which allow the pottery to be dated using pottery reference guides.

Sea pottery shards can give insights into historical trade routes, manufacturing techniques, and daily life in previous centuries. Pottery pieces can be traced back to specific manufacturers and periods, providing information for historians and archaeologists. As an example of the significance of sea pottery in global history, there is an abundance of sea pottery, or "Chaney," buried in the beaches of St. Croix in the US Virgin Islands. The term "Chaney" blends "china" and "money," referencing the broken pieces of European pottery brought over by colonial powers including, England, France, the Netherlands, and Denmark. These shards ended up in the earth through various means: discarded by sailors avoiding taxes, shattered in rituals rooted in European traditions, tossed away as plantation refuse, or trampled into the ground during nineteenth-century labor uprisings. Chaney is a layered symbol of colonialism, ownership, and historical disruption.

== Collectors ==
Collecting sea pottery has become a popular hobby among beachcombers and collectors, with finds being valued not only for their aesthetic appeal but also for the historical context they provide.

Sea pottery is often used in household decorations and furnishings as well as jewellery. Some enthusiasts fill jars with sea pottery to display. As plastics and Tupperware became more utilized during the 20th century, glass and ceramics became less popular.

== Environmental impact ==
Sea pottery highlights issues related to marine debris and ocean pollution. Many pieces of sea pottery originated from discarded or shipwrecked items, demonstrating the long history of human impact on marine environments. Collectors and environmentalists often work together to clean up beaches, finding sea pottery while also removing harmful debris.

Efforts to conserve and protect coastal environments play a crucial role in preserving sea pottery. Beach clean-ups and educational programs help raise awareness about marine pollution and the importance of protecting oceans. Conservationists emphasize responsible collecting practices to ensure that natural habitats are not disturbed.

== Notable locations ==
Certain locations around the world are renowned for their abundance of sea pottery. Beaches in the United Kingdom, such as Seaham Beach in County Durham, and sites in the United States, like Glass Beach in California, are famous for their rich deposits of sea pottery and glass. These sites attract tourists and collectors alike, eager to find unique pieces.
