= Glass Beach (ʻEleʻele, Hawaii) =

Beach consisting of sea glass in Hawaii

Coordinates: 21°53′53″N 159°35′2″W

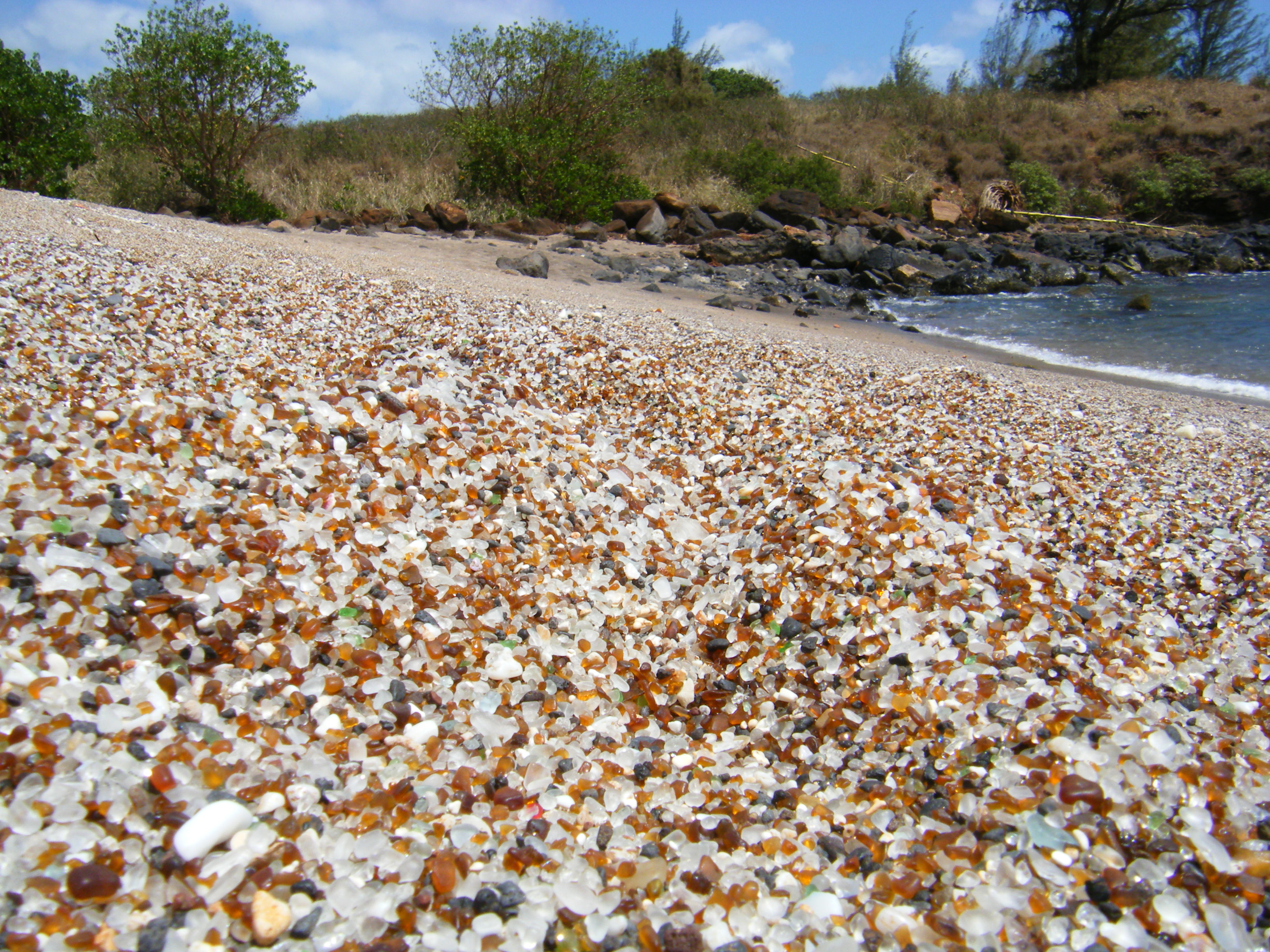
Glass Beach in Hanapepe, Hawaii

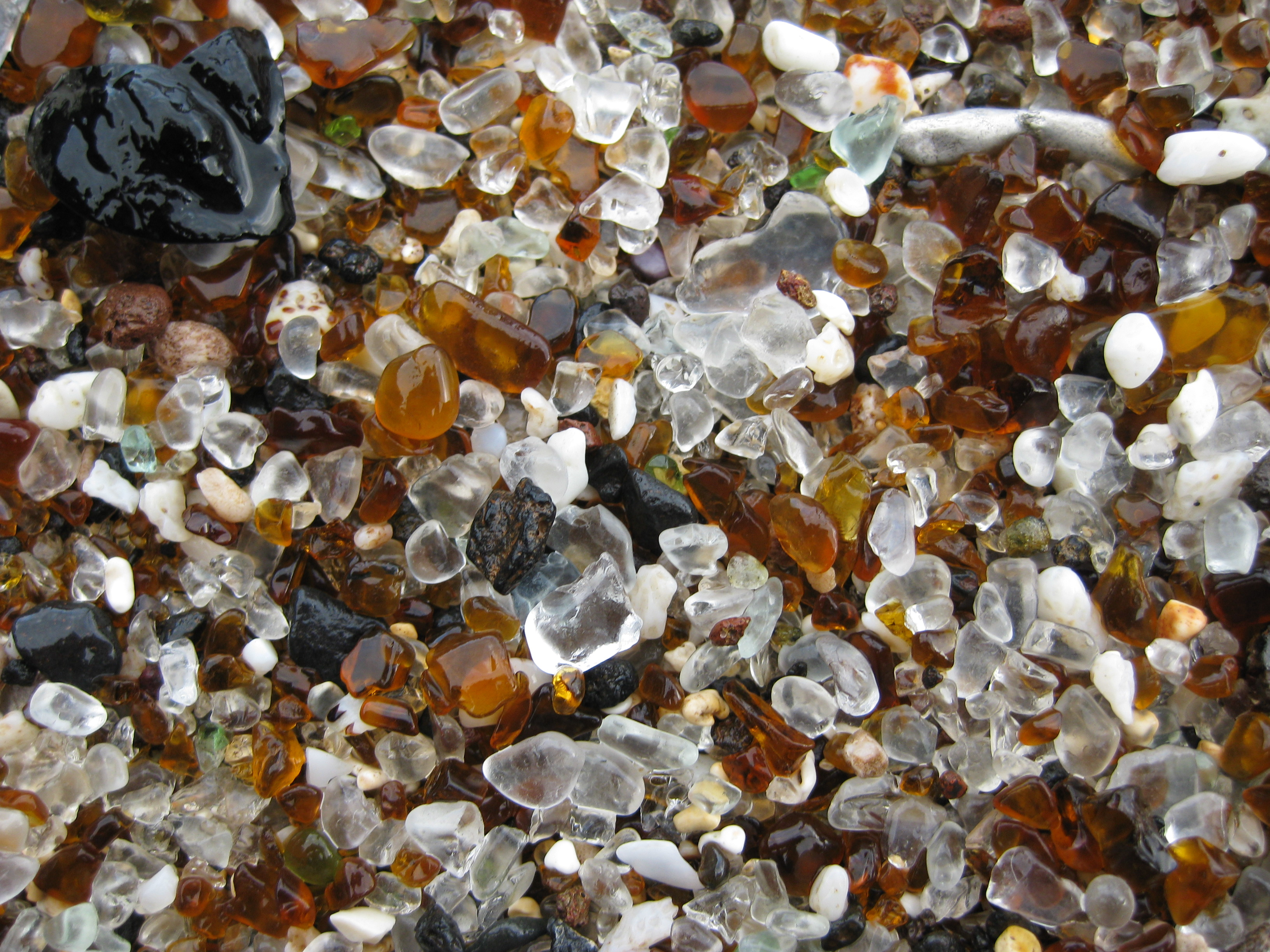
A close-up of the sea glass

Glass Beach is a beach in ʻEleʻele, an industrial area in Kauai, Hawaii, that is made of sea glass. It is in Hanapepe Bay, near Port Allen Harbor. The beach's regular rock is basalt, but the sea glass formed after years of discarded glass.

== See also ==
There are similar beaches in Fort Bragg and Benicia, California.
