= Star sand =

Marine sediment made of foraminifera remains

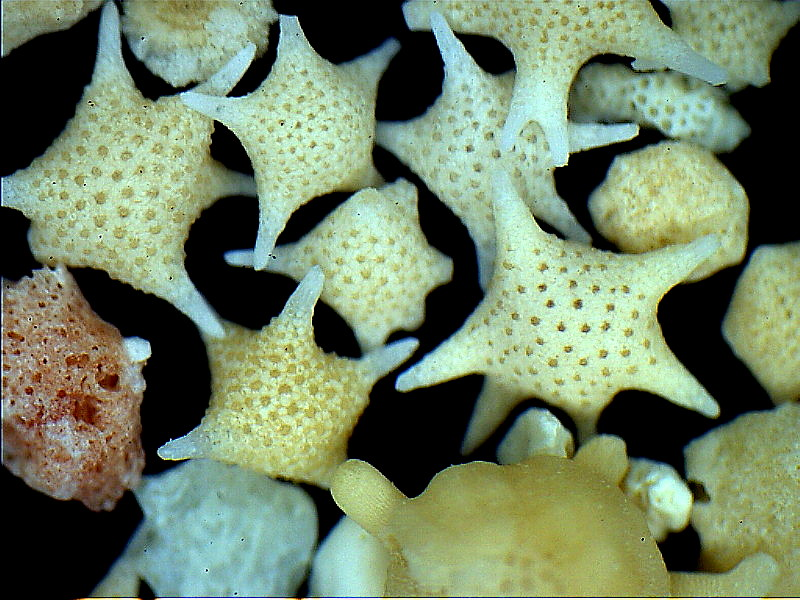
Magnified star sand found in Okinawa

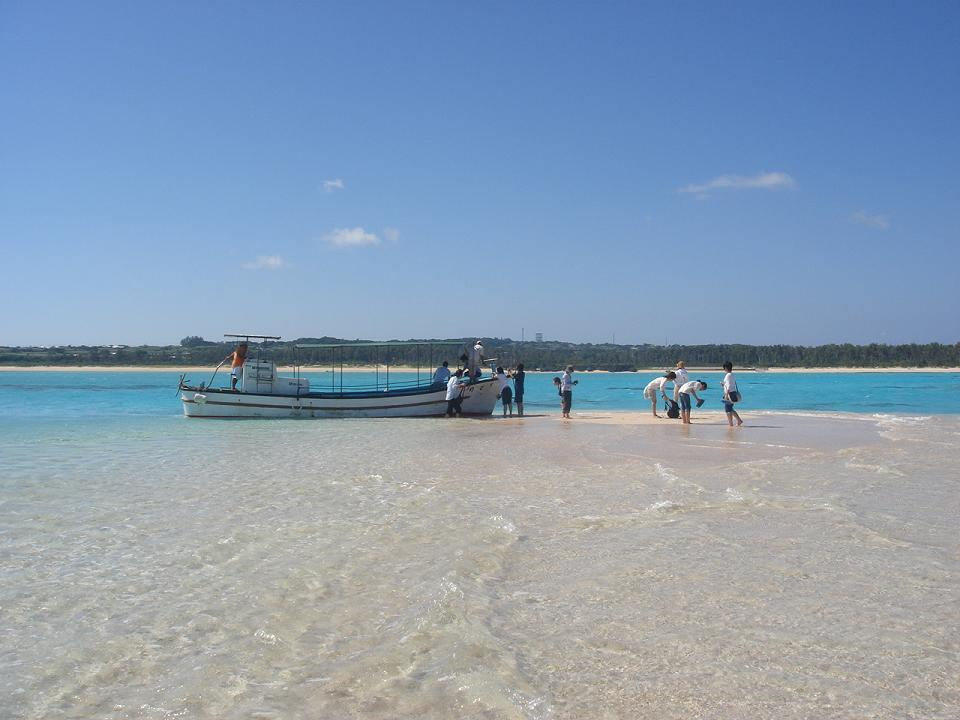
Yurigahama beach on Yoronjima is famous for its star sand

Star sand (Japanese: 星砂, romanized: hoshizuna, lit. 'star-sand'), also known as living sand, is a rare sand-like substance made up of the star-shaped skeletal remains of marine foraminifera in the family Calcirinidae. When the Calcirinids die, their skeletons are swept from their reef habitats and accumulate by the billions on shore. A Japanese myth holds that grains of star sand are the skeletons of descendants of the North Star and the Southern Cross, fallen to the waters of Okinawa and killed by a serpent sent by the god of the sea. Star sand is found on shores throughout the west and south Pacific, including in the Indonesian archipelago, the Okinawa Islands, and Raine Island. Development of star sand causes beaches to "grow" over time as a result of the forams' life cycle, with annual rates of calcium carbonate production as high as 1 kg/m^{2} near coral reef margins in the Pacific. Because of this, laboratory production of star sand for beach renourishment has been developed in Japan. The Japanese government has cultured star sand at Okinotorishima to build the islet into a more stable atoll and thus to strengthen Japan's legal claim to the surrounding waters, which otherwise would belong to China. Up to three quarters of the sediment mass of Tuvalu is star sand. Bottles of star sand are sold as souvenirs. Arenophiles acquire samples of star sand through trade with other enthusiasts. Collection of large quantities of star sand for commercial purposes from the Great Barrier Reef is prohibited. Since 1979, the erosion of individual grains of Baculogypsina sphaerulata star sand has been used as a metric of littoral drift in Japan, with scientists using the lengths of the skeletal spines to reconstruct the origins and travel distances of sediment deposits. A similar process of measuring star sand spines was used in 2012 to study depositional processes on Raine Reef in the Great Barrier Reef.

== See also ==
- Conchology
- Glass Beach (Fort Bragg, California)
