= Sea glass =

Glass weathered by the ocean

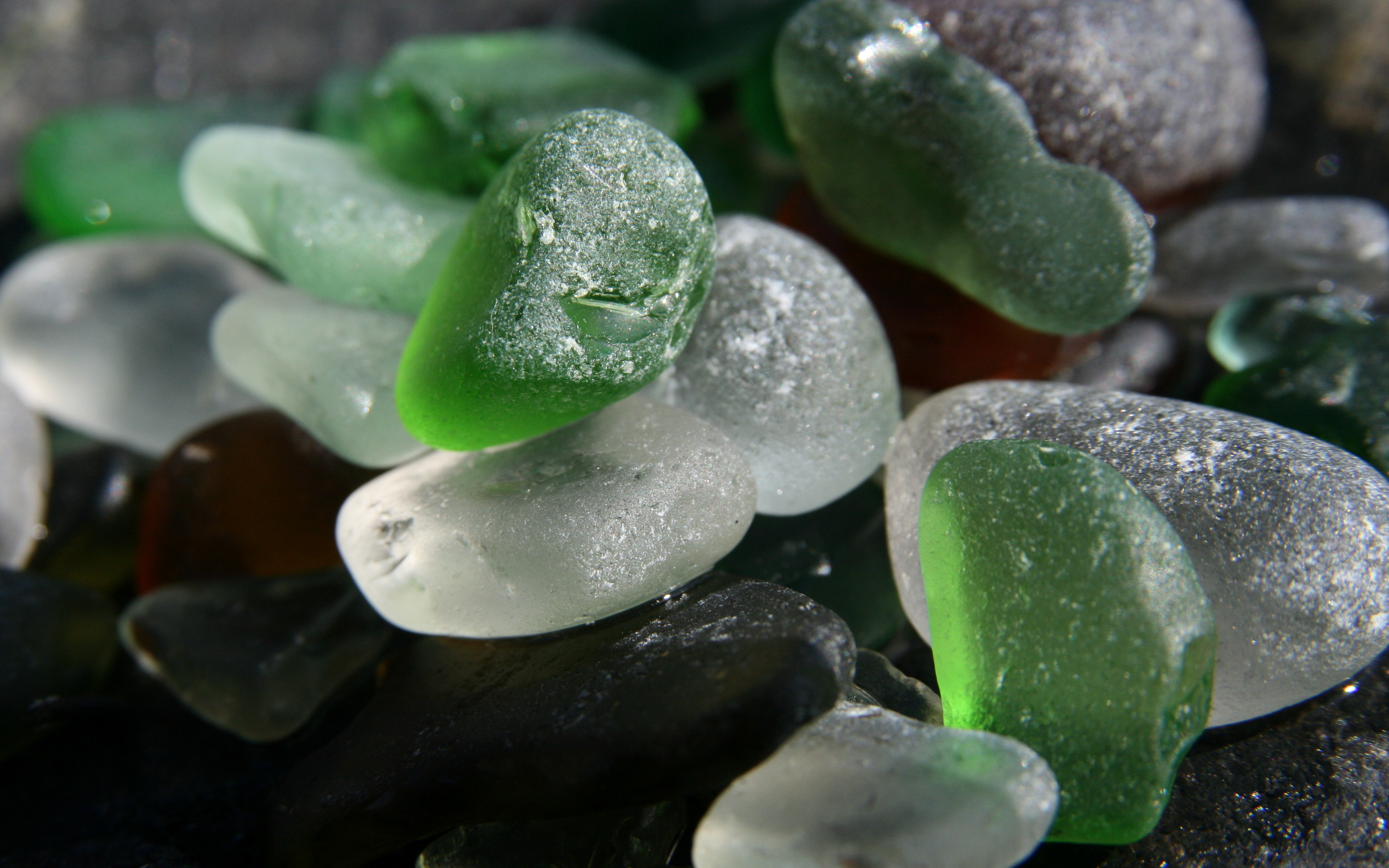
Green and white sea glass

Sea glass is physically polished and chemically weathered glass found on beaches along bodies of salt water. It consists of fragments of drinkwares or other human-made vessels, which often have the appearance of tumbled stones. Weathering produces natural frosted glass. Sea glass is used for decoration, most commonly in jewelry. Beach glass is physically polished and chemically weathered glass found on beaches along bodies of fresh water and is often less frosted in appearance than sea glass. Sea glass takes 20–40 years, and sometimes as much as 100–200 years, to acquire its characteristic texture and shape. It is also colloquially referred to as drift glass from the longshore drift process that forms the smooth edges. In practice, the two terms are used interchangeably.

== Formation ==
Sea glass begins as normal shards of broken glass that are then persistently tumbled and ground until the sharp edges are smoothed and rounded. In this process, the glass loses its slick surface but gains a frosted appearance over many years.

Naturally produced sea glass ("genuine sea glass") originates as pieces of glass from broken bottles, broken tableware, or even shipwrecks, which are rolled and tumbled in the ocean for years until all of their edges are rounded off, and the slickness of the glass has been worn to a frosted appearance. Then, the glass will wash to shore where it may be collected.

== Colors ==
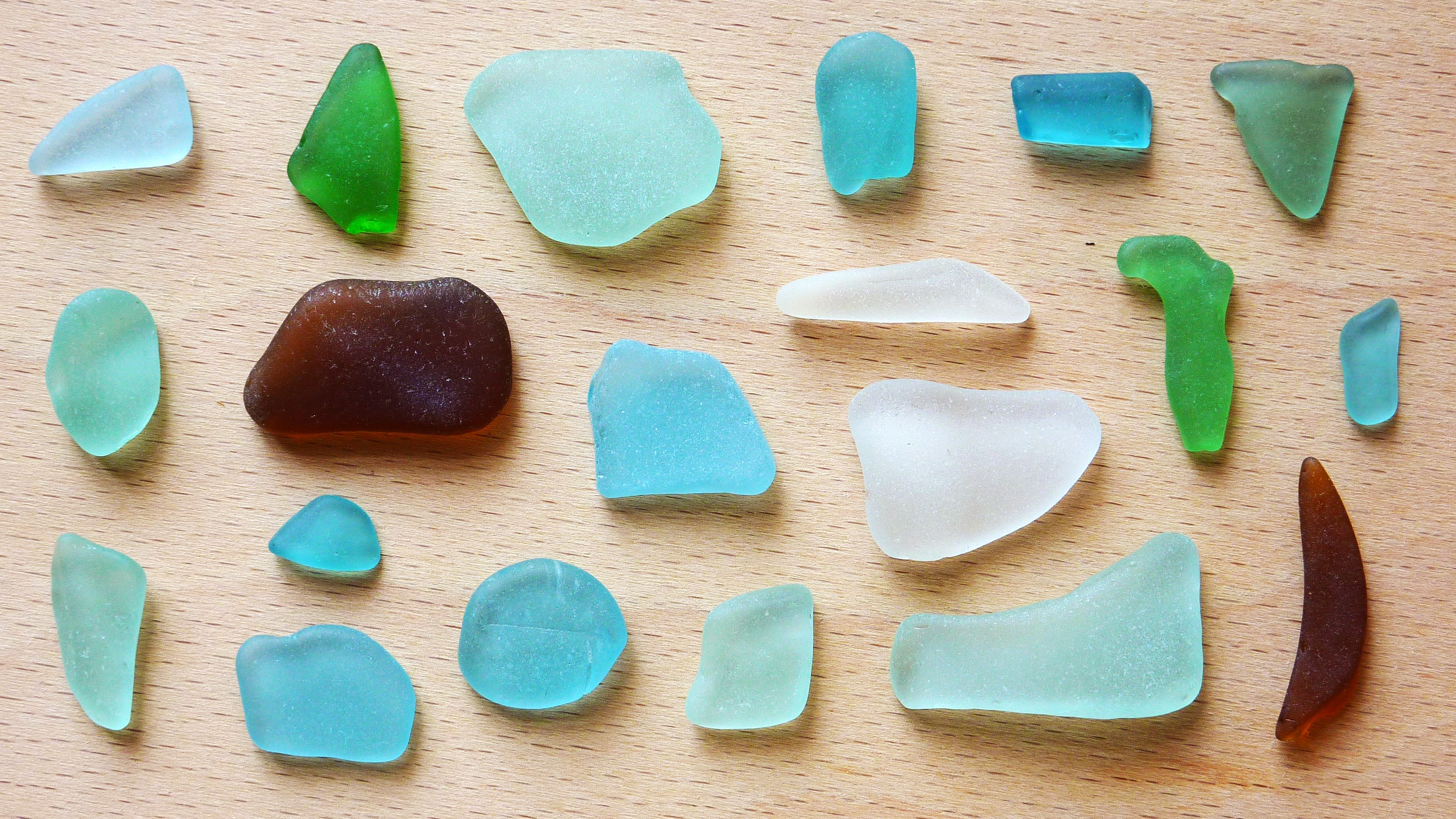
Assorted colors of sea glass

The color of sea glass is determined by its original source, and most sea glass comes from bottles. Besides pieces of glass, colored sea pottery pieces are often also found.

The most common colors of sea glass are kelly green, brown, white, and clear that come predominantly from bottles of beer, juices and soft drinks and fishing floats. The clear or white glass also comes from clear plates and glasses, windshields, windows, and assorted other sources.

Less common colors include jade, amber (from bottles for whiskey, medicine, spirits, and early laundry bleach), golden amber or amberina (mostly from bottles for spirits), lime green (from 1960s bottles for soda), forest green, and ice- or soft blue (from bottles for soda, medicine, ink, and fruit jars from the late 19th and early 20th centuries, windows, and windshields). These colors are found about once for every 25 to 100 pieces of sea glass found.

Uncommon colors of sea glass include a type of green, which comes primarily from early to mid-1900s bottles of Coca-Cola, Dr Pepper, and RC Cola as well as from bottles of beer. Soft green colors could come from bottles of ink, fruit, and baking soda. These colors are found once in every 50 to 100 pieces.

Purple sea glass is very uncommon, as is citron, opaque white (from milk bottles), cobalt blue and cornflower blue (from early milk of magnesia bottles, poison bottles, artwork, Bromo-Seltzer and Vicks VapoRub containers), and aqua (from Ball Mason jars and certain 19th century glass bottles). These colors are found once for every 200 to 1,000 pieces found.

Extremely rare colors include gray, pink (often from Great Depression-era plates), teal (often from Mateus wine bottles), black (older, very dark olive green glass), yellow (often from 1930s Vaseline containers), turquoise (from tableware and art glass), red (often from old Schlitz bottles, car tail lights, dinnerware, or nautical lights, it is found once in about every 5,000 pieces), and orange (the least common type of sea glass, found once in about 10,000 pieces). These colors are found once for every 1,000 to 10,000 pieces collected. Some shards of black glass are quite old, originating from thick eighteenth-century gin, beer, and wine bottles.

=== Antique black sea glass ===
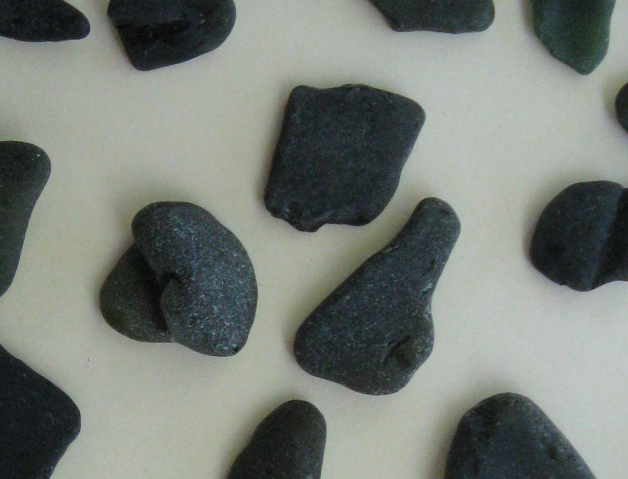
"Black" sea glass collected in Jamaica. Under good lighting the green shade of the original glass before weathering can be seen.

Old black glass bottles that had iron slag added during production to increase strength and opaqueness were at times broken in shipment.

== Artificial ==
In order to make artificial sea glass, a tumbler, sand, and glass are necessary.

A number of characteristics highlight the differences between artificial sea glass and natural sea glass, starting with the coloration and surface texture of each piece. An example of natural sea glass will usually have a frosty, almost powdery texture at different points. One of the most reliable indicators for natural sea glass is a C-shaped design all over the outside of the sample. If the design is located on the piece, it is authentic sea glass, since artificial glass will typically not have that particular design. Sea glass usually comes from broken glass bottles or other household items, so pieces found on beaches will not be perfectly shaped, unlike artificial sea glass, often sold as beach glass.

== See also ==
- Glass Beach (Fort Bragg, California)
- Sea pottery
- Star sand
