= Glass Beach (Fort Bragg, California) =

Beach in northern California, USA

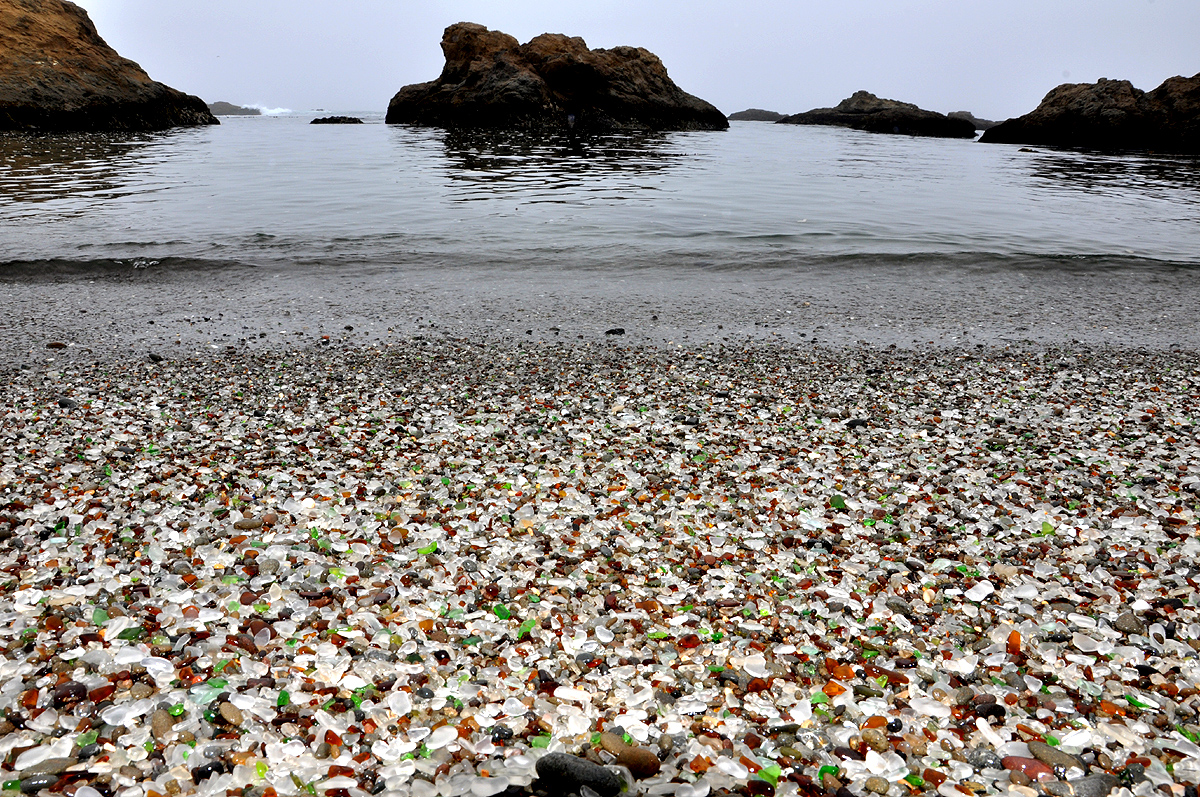

- Location within California Location within the United States
- Location: Mendocino County, California
- Nearest city: Fort Bragg, California
- Coordinates: 39°27′13″N 123°48′47″W
- Area: 38 acres (15 ha)
- Established: 1959
- Governing body: California Department of Parks and Recreation

Glass Beach is a beach adjacent to MacKerricher State Park near Fort Bragg, California, named from a time when it was abundant with sea glass created from years of dumping garbage into an area of coastline near the northern part of the town.

== History ==
In 1906, Fort Bragg residents established an official water dump site behind the Union Lumber Company onto what is now known as "Site 1". Most water-fronted communities had water dump sites discarding glass, appliances, and even vehicles. Locals referred to it as "The Dumps." Fires were often lit using Molotov cocktails to reduce the size of the trash pile.

When the original dump site filled up in 1943, the site was moved to what is now known as "Site 2", the active dump site from 1943 until 1949. When this beach became full in 1949, the dump was moved north to what is now known as "Glass Beach", which remained an active dump site until 1967.

The California State Water Resources Control Board and city leaders closed this area in 1967. Various cleanup programs were undertaken through the years to correct the damage. Over the next several decades, what was biodegradable in the dump sites simply degraded and all the metal and other items were eventually removed and sold as scrap or used in art. The pounding waves broke down the glass and pottery and tumbled those pieces into the small, smooth, colored pieces that often become jewelry-quality, which cover Glass Beach and the other two glass beaches (former dump sites) in Fort Bragg.

There are three Glass Beach sites in Fort Bragg where trash was dumped into the ocean between 1906 and 1967. Site Two (1943–1949) and Three (1949–1967 – "Glass Beach") are located at the end of the path that begins on the corner of Elm Street and Glass Beach Drive. These sites are accessible by foot and by a short climb down the cliffs surrounding the beach. Site One (1906–43) is .25 miles (0.40 kilometers) south of Site Two and has become accessible by foot as of January 2015 when the northern section of the new Coastal Trail in Fort Bragg opened.

In 1998, the private owner of the property began a five-year process of working with the California Coastal Conservancy and the California Integrated Waste Management Board for the cleanup and sale of the property to the state. Following completion of the clean up, the California Department of Parks and Recreation purchased the 38-acre (15-hectare) property adjacent to Glass Beach, and it was incorporated into MacKerricher State Park in October 2002.

All of the actual "Glass Beach", Site 3, is adjacent to MacKerricher State Park. All entities in California end at the mean high water mark (MHW), according to Article 10 of the state constitution. In Fort Bragg, the mean high water mark is 5.2 feet (1.6 meters), and all of Glass Beach, Site 3, is below that water mark. Sites 1 & 2 are located south of "Glass Beach" and do not abut the state park area, though they abut the new city park area, which also ends at the mean high water mark (MHW).

== Tourism ==
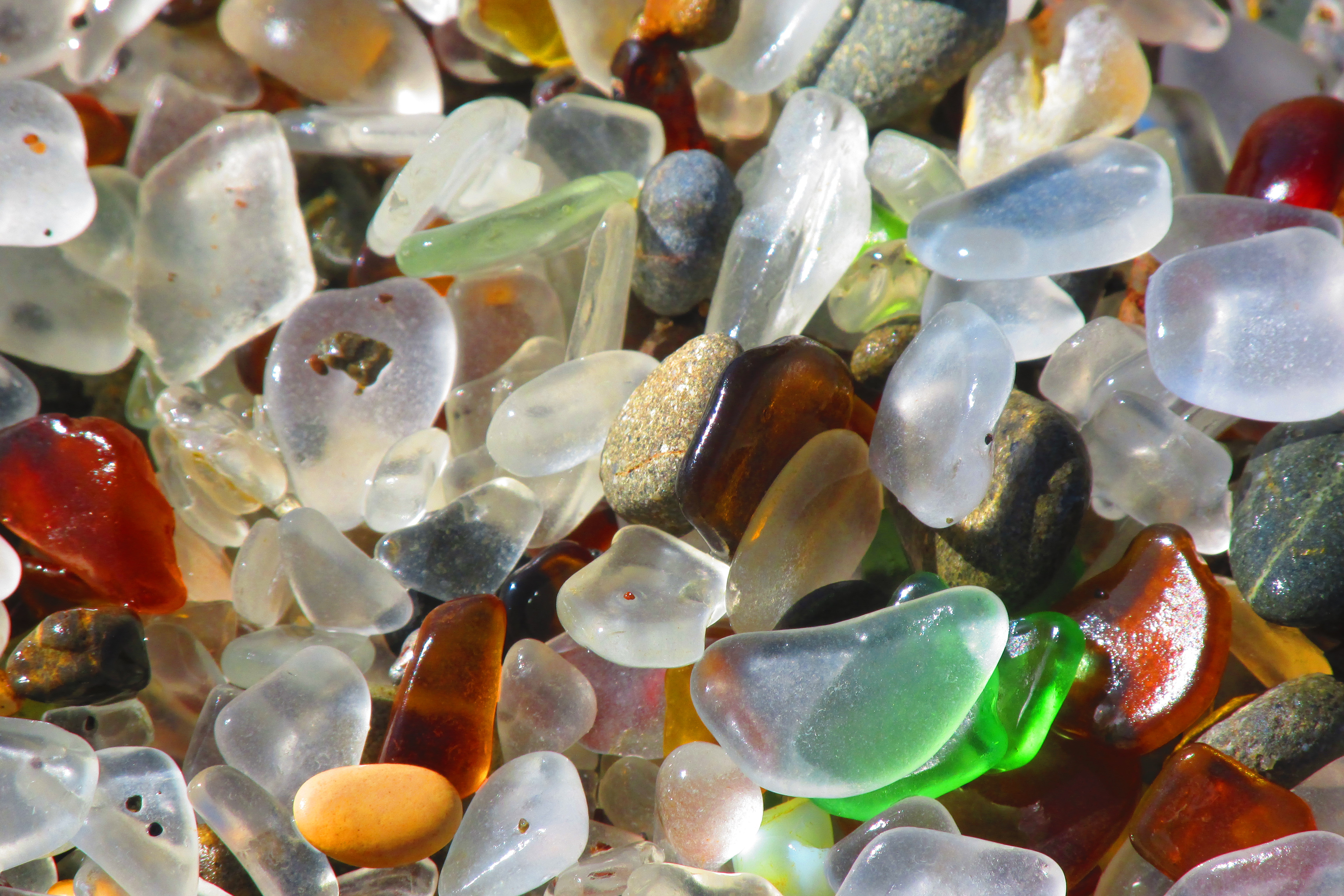
Rounded glass at the beach

The beach is now visited by tens of thousands of tourists yearly. Collecting is discouraged by State Park Rangers on the section of "Glass Beach" adjacent to the state park, where they ask people to leave what little glass is left for others to enjoy, although most of the sea glass is now found on the other two glass beaches outside the state park area.

About 1,000 to 1,200 tourists visit Fort Bragg's glass beaches each day in the summer. Most collect some glass. Because of this and also because of natural factors (wave action is constantly grinding down the glass), the glass is slowly diminishing. There is currently a movement by Captain J. H. (Cass) Forrington to replenish the beaches with discarded glass. Captain Forrington, founder, owner and curator of the local Sea Glass Museum, is a strong advocate for a full-time research facility studying the benefits to the marine environment of the minerals used to make and clarify the glass, with a supporting aquarium that highlights the rich diversity of life found in Fort Bragg's waters, with the ultimate goal of promoting the formation of glass reefs to initiate new food chains worldwide on all the badly depleted continental shelves. Fort Bragg currently trucks its glass over the Sierra Nevada mountains to a landfill in Sparks, Nevada, even though 90 percent of the 7-foot (2.1 m) depth of glass that used to cover Glass Beach, Site 3, was locally recycled, being used in things like the pathways to the Guest House Museum and Skunk Train, and in art like the beautiful back-lit mosaic created by high school students that adorns one of the local temples. On December 10, 2012, the City Council of the City of Fort Bragg discussed the beach glass depletion and declined to move forward with replenishment efforts due to the cost and perceived likelihood that required permits would not be approved.

Similar beaches are found in Benicia, California, and Eleele, Hawaii.

== Plants and animals ==
Several endangered and protected native plants occur at Glass Beach including hybrid Menzies' wallflower.

== Composition and impact ==
The composition of Glass Beach sands include quartz, mafic minerals and feldspar intermingled with well rounded glass components of white, brown and green grains (Kerwin 1997). Besides glass, Fort Bragg's iconic beach is also made up of tin pieces (Bascom 1960). In fact, the composition of Fort Bragg is so interesting that researchers are showing the benefits of creating replicated beaches like Fort Bragg in Southern California, Louisiana and Florida (Wildman 2018). The density and size of the items like tin on the beach create a sufficient and sustainable aggregate (Bascom 1960). Fort Bragg has inspired the idea using RCGC (known as recycled crushed glass cullet) as a beach aggregate (Kerwin 1997).

== Gallery ==
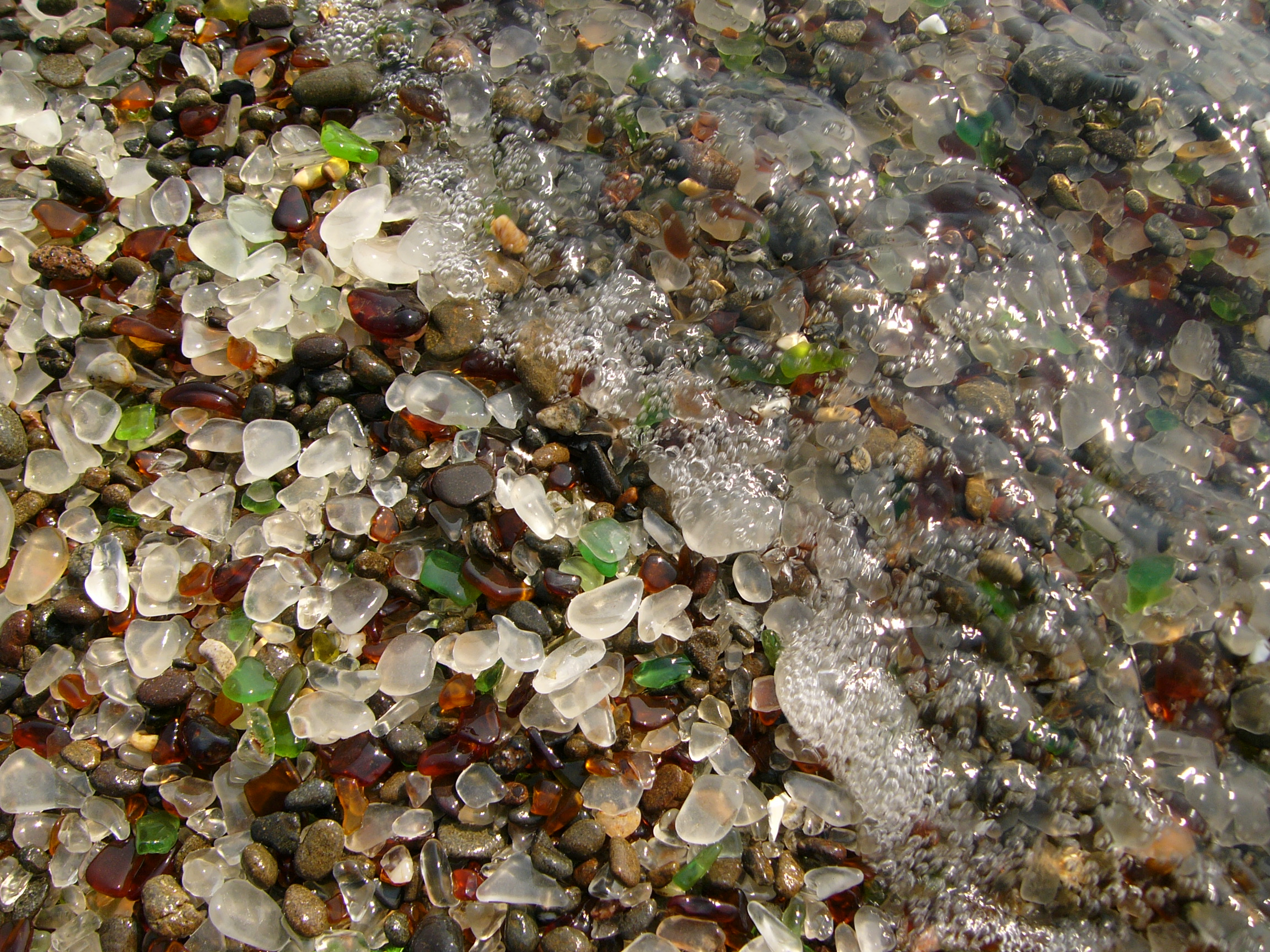
A small wave on the beach

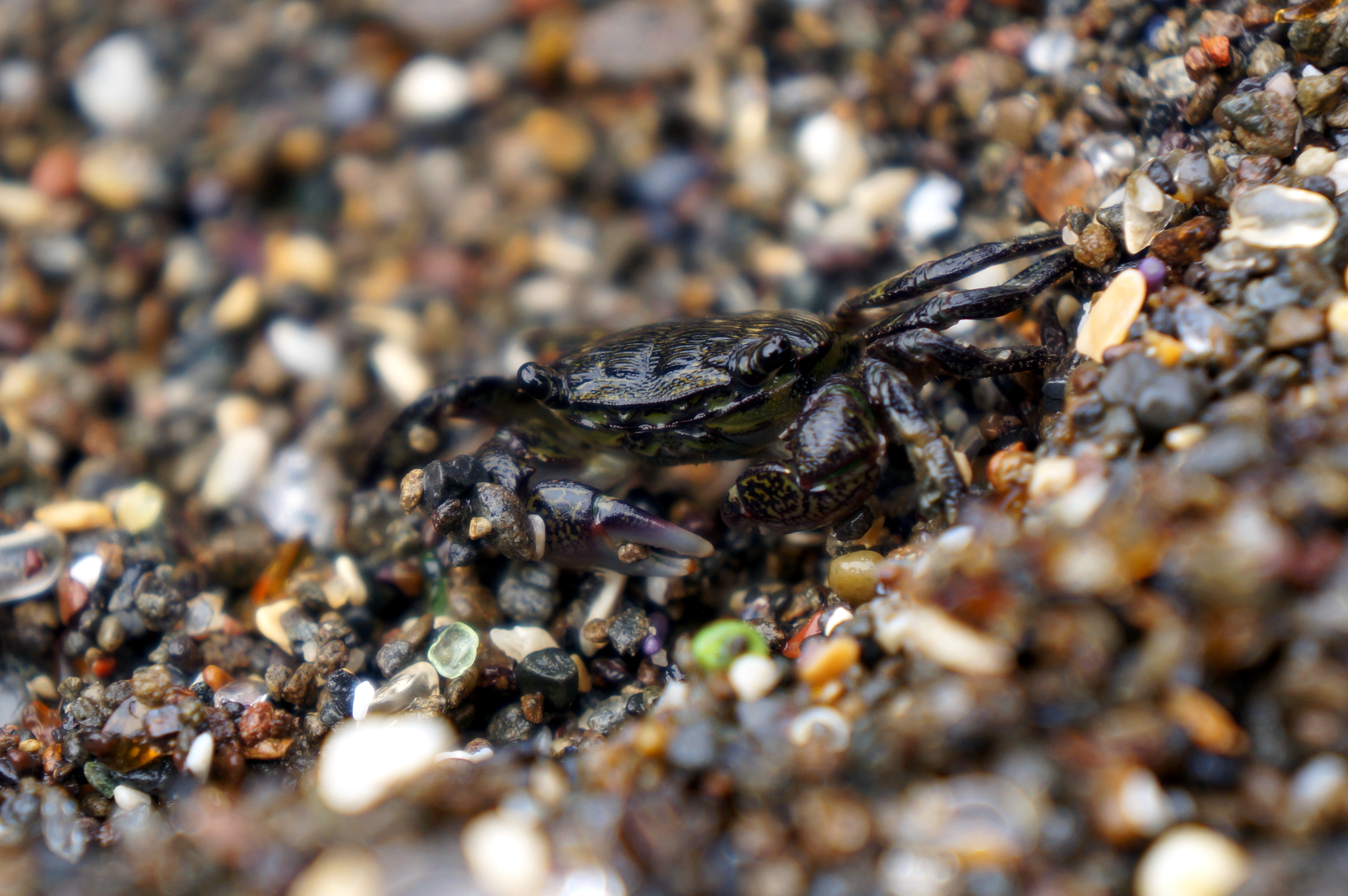
A striped shore crab scurrying around in Glass Beach

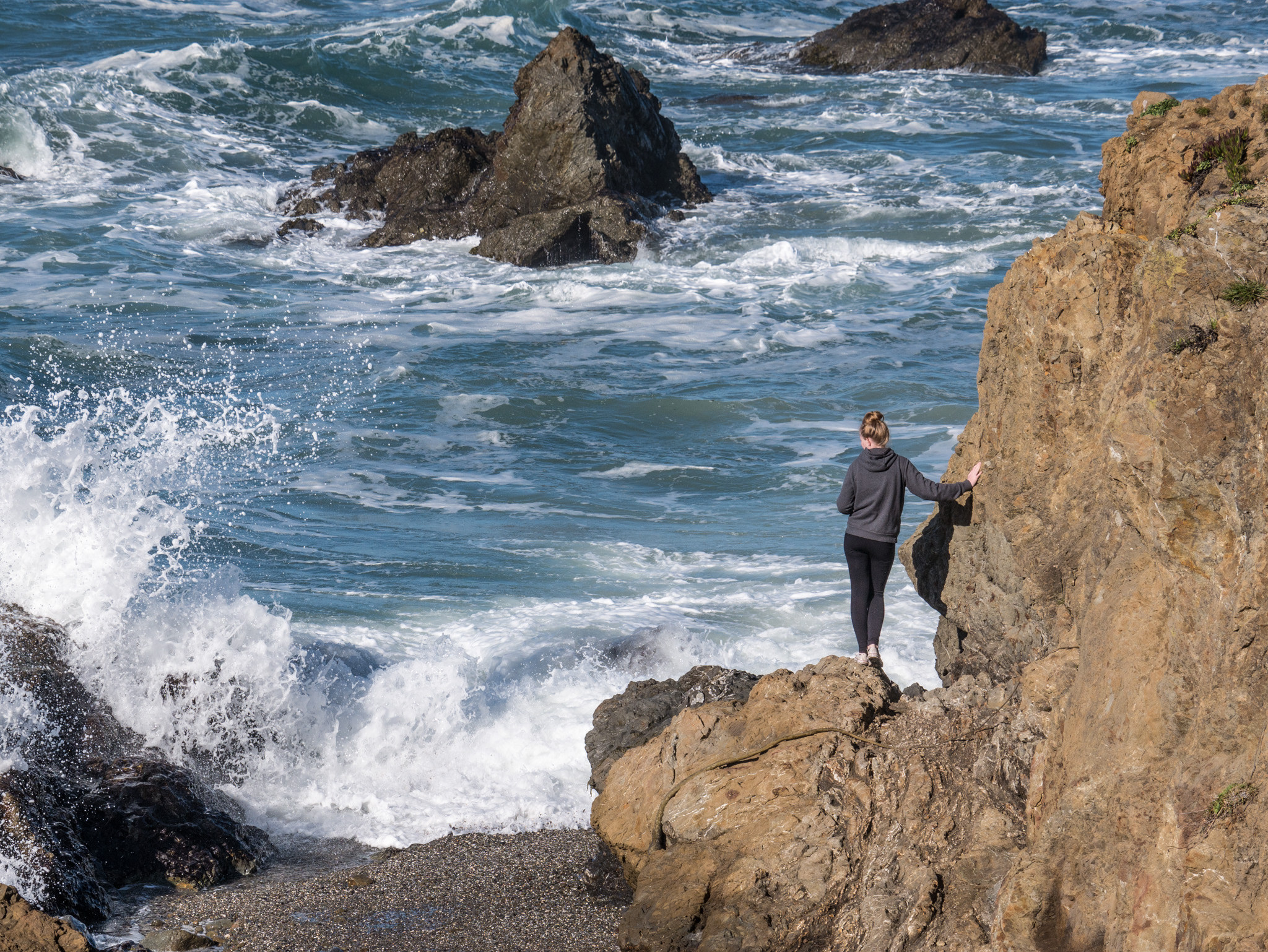
Girl standing on a rock at Glass Beach

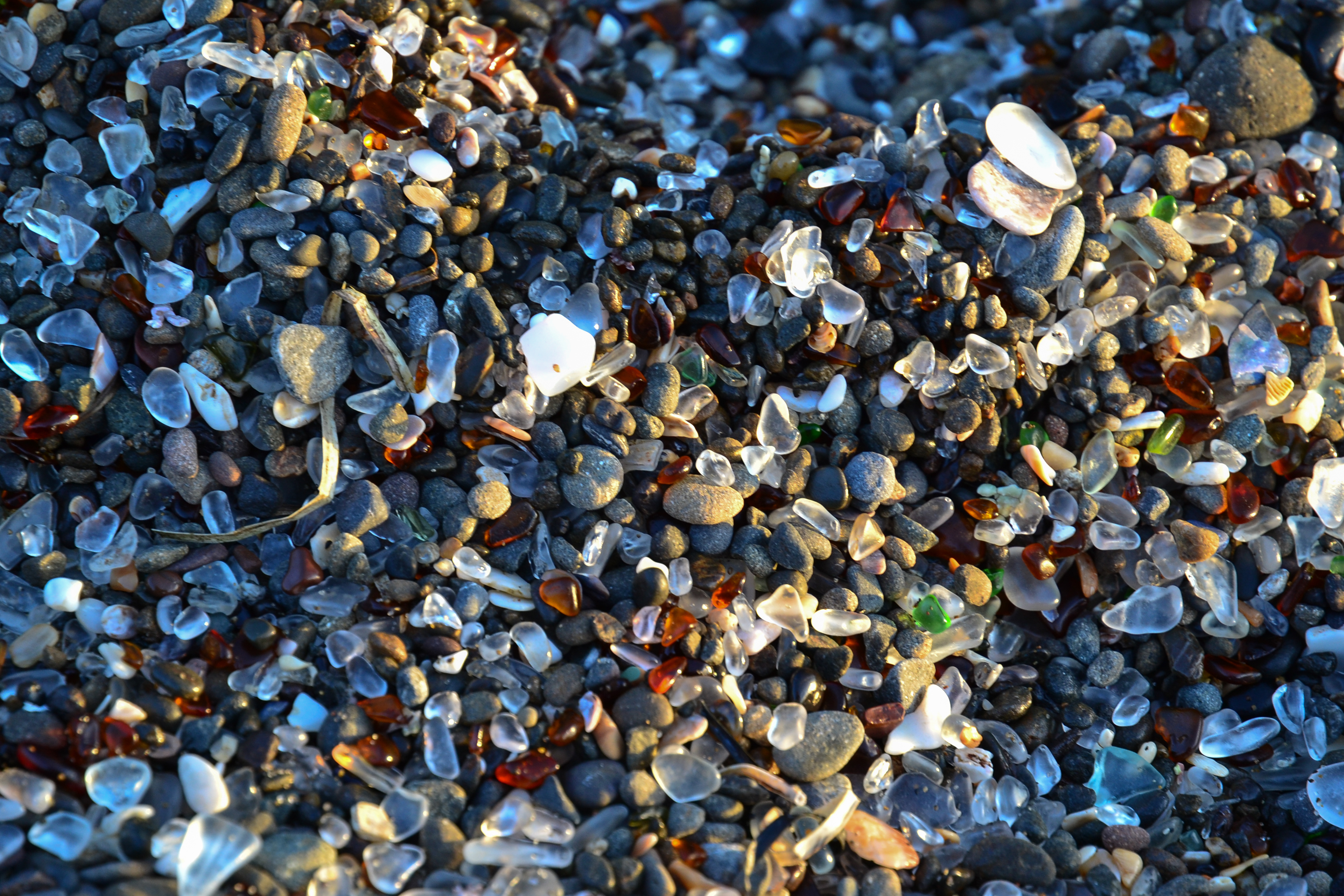
Mixed composition of Fort Bragg Glass Beach

== See also ==
- Star sand
