= 1977 =

1977 in various calendars
- Gregorian calendar: 1977; MCMLXXVII
- Ab urbe condita: 2730
- Armenian calendar: 1426; ԹՎ ՌՆԻԶ
- Assyrian calendar: 6727
- Baháʼí calendar: 133–134
- Balinese saka calendar: 1898–1899
- Bengali calendar: 1383–1384
- Berber calendar: 2927
- British Regnal year: 25 Eliz. 2 – 26 Eliz. 2
- Buddhist calendar: 2521
- Burmese calendar: 1339
- Byzantine calendar: 7485–7486
- Chinese calendar: 丙辰年 (Fire Dragon); 4674 or 4467 — to — 丁巳年 (Fire Snake); 4675 or 4468
- Coptic calendar: 1693–1694
- Discordian calendar: 3143
- Ethiopian calendar: 1969–1970
- Hebrew calendar: 5737–5738
- Hindu calendars
- Vikram Samvat: 2033–2034
- Shaka Samvat: 1898–1899
- Kali Yuga: 5077–5078
- Holocene calendar: 11977
- Igbo calendar: 977–978
- Iranian calendar: 1355–1356
- Islamic calendar: 1397–1398
- Japanese calendar: Shōwa 52 (昭和５２年)
- Javanese calendar: 1908–1909
- Juche calendar: 66
- Julian calendar: Gregorian minus 13 days
- Korean calendar: 4310
- Minguo calendar: ROC 66 民國66年
- Nanakshahi calendar: 509
- Thai solar calendar: 2520
- Tibetan calendar: མེ་ཕོ་འབྲུག་ལོ་ (male Fire-Dragon); 2103 or 1722 or 950 — to — མེ་མོ་སྦྲུལ་ལོ་ (female Fire-Snake); 2104 or 1723 or 951
- Unix time: 220924800 – 252460799

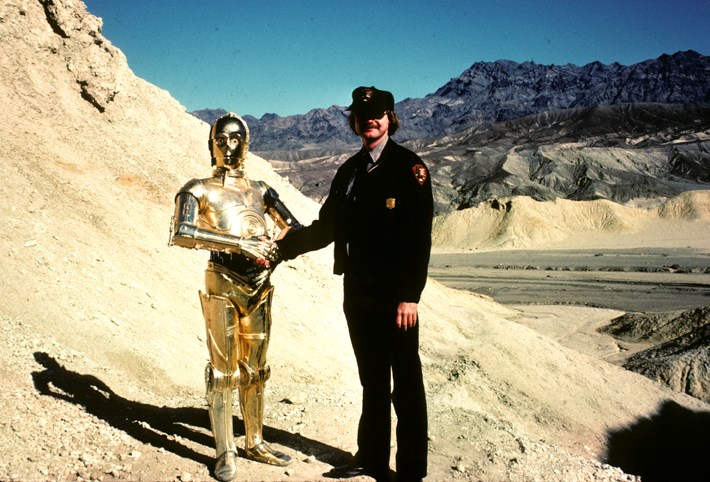
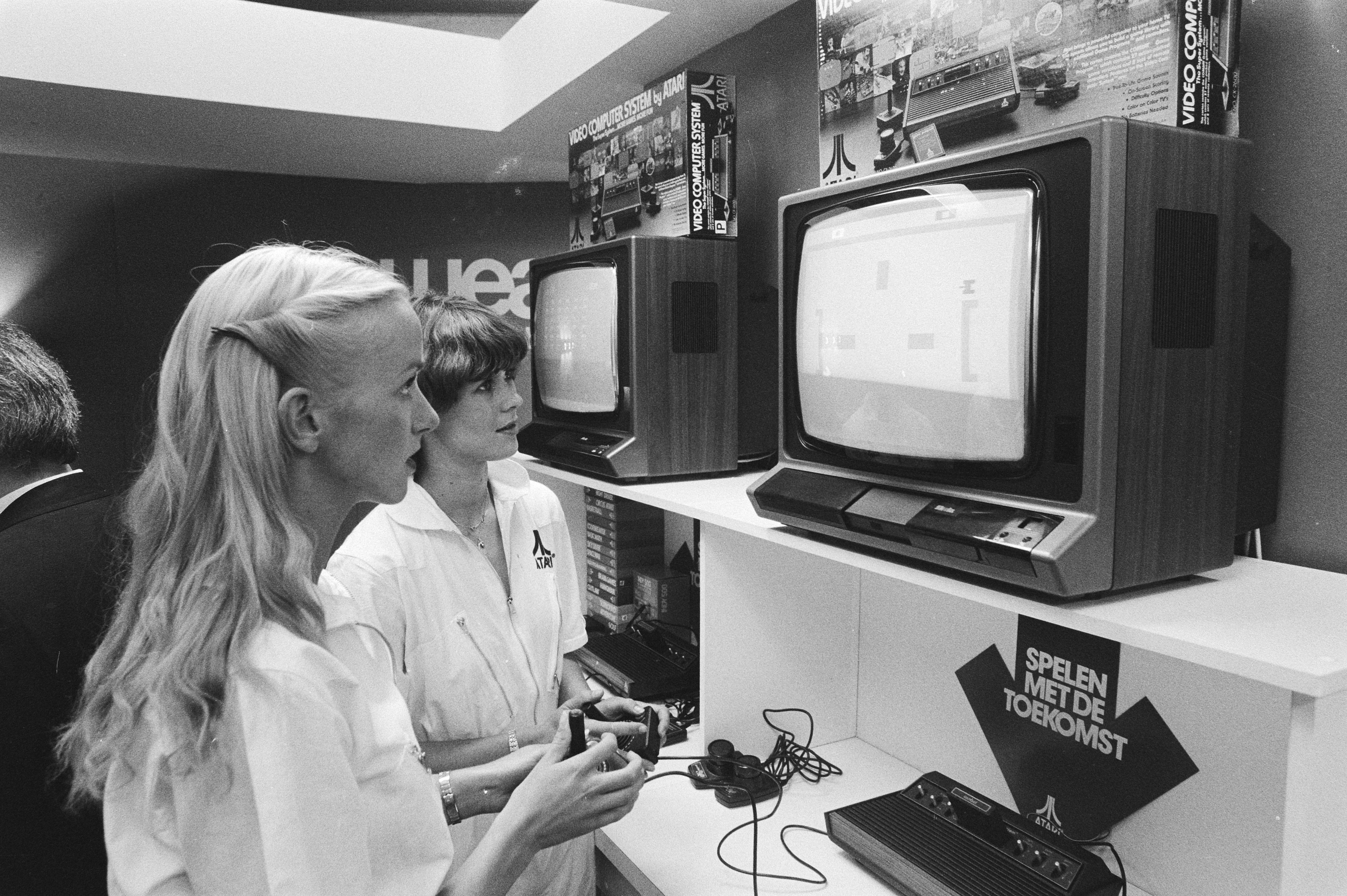
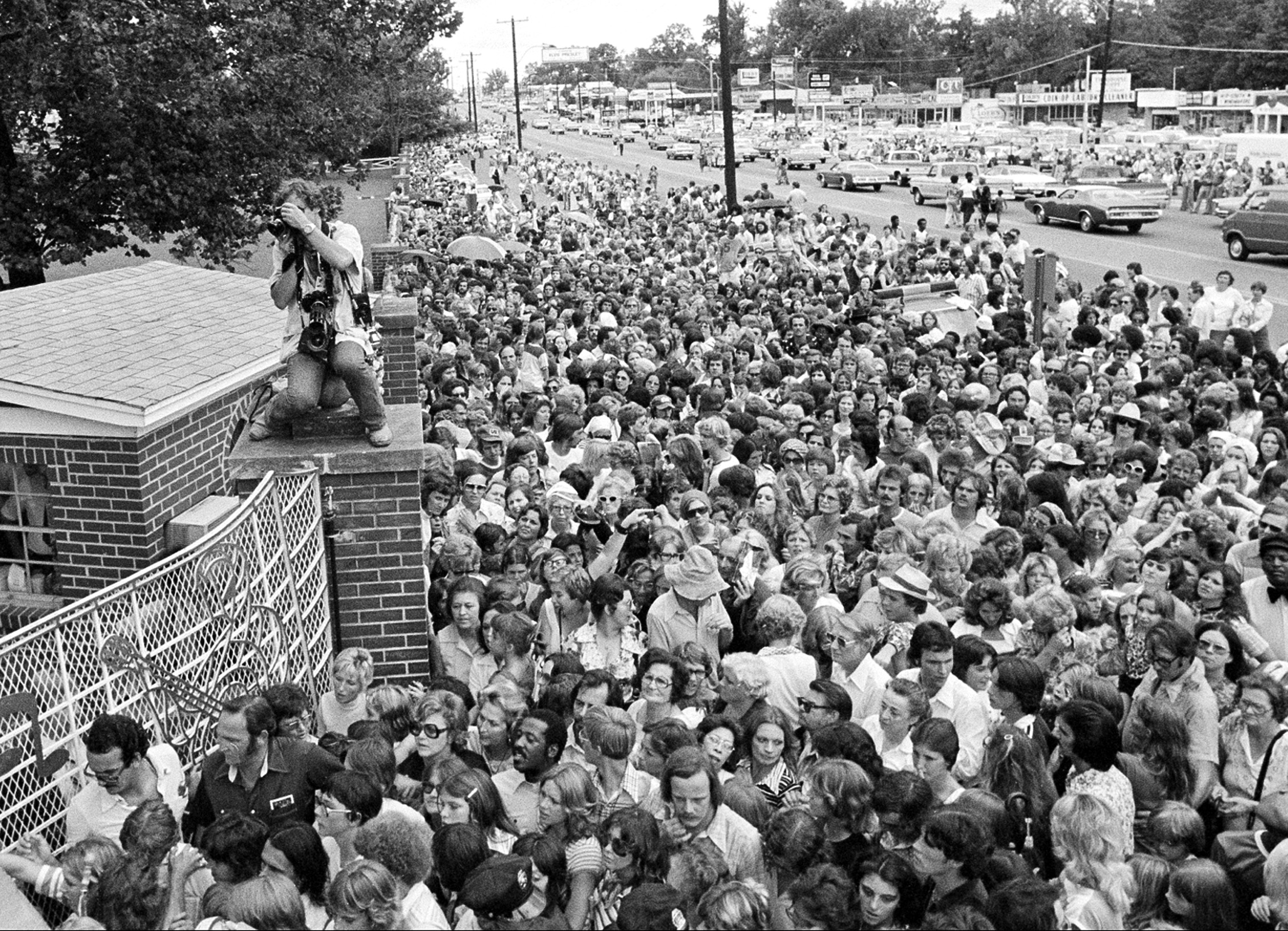
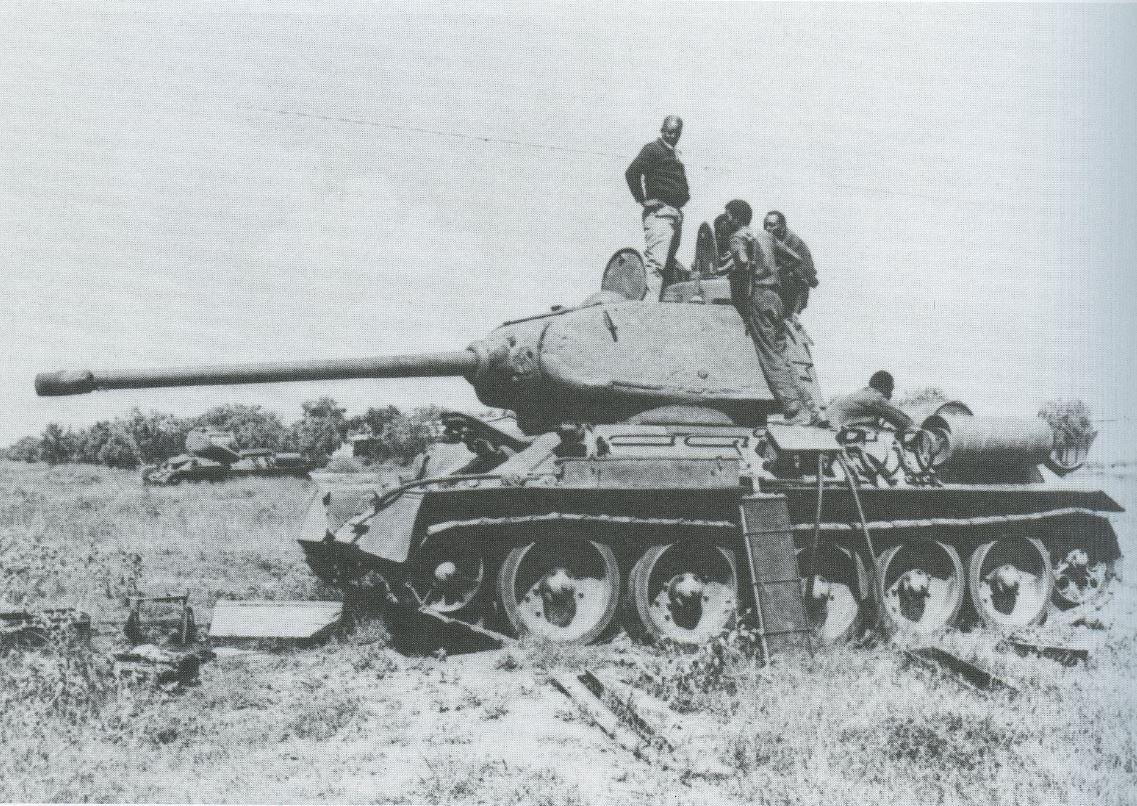
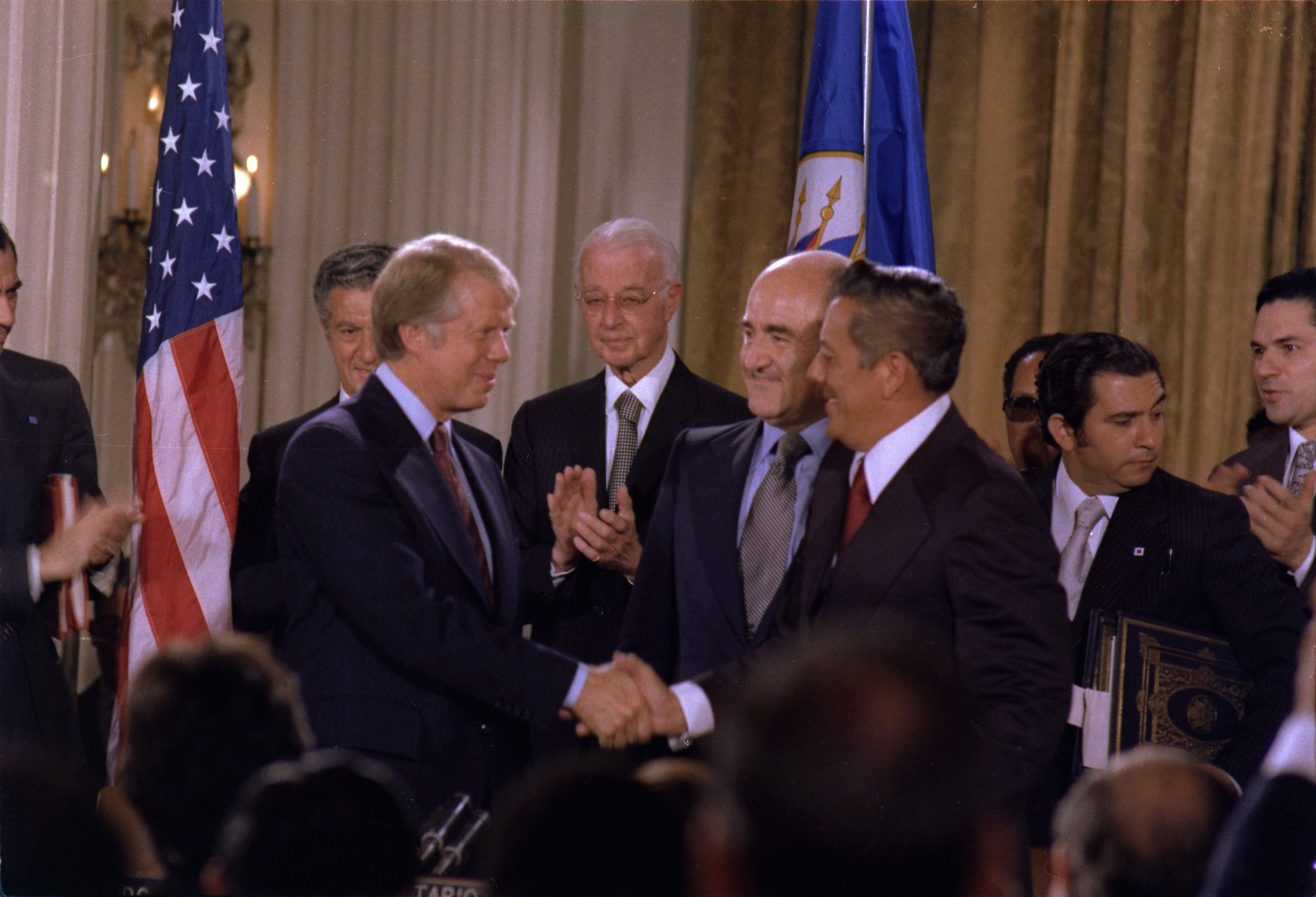
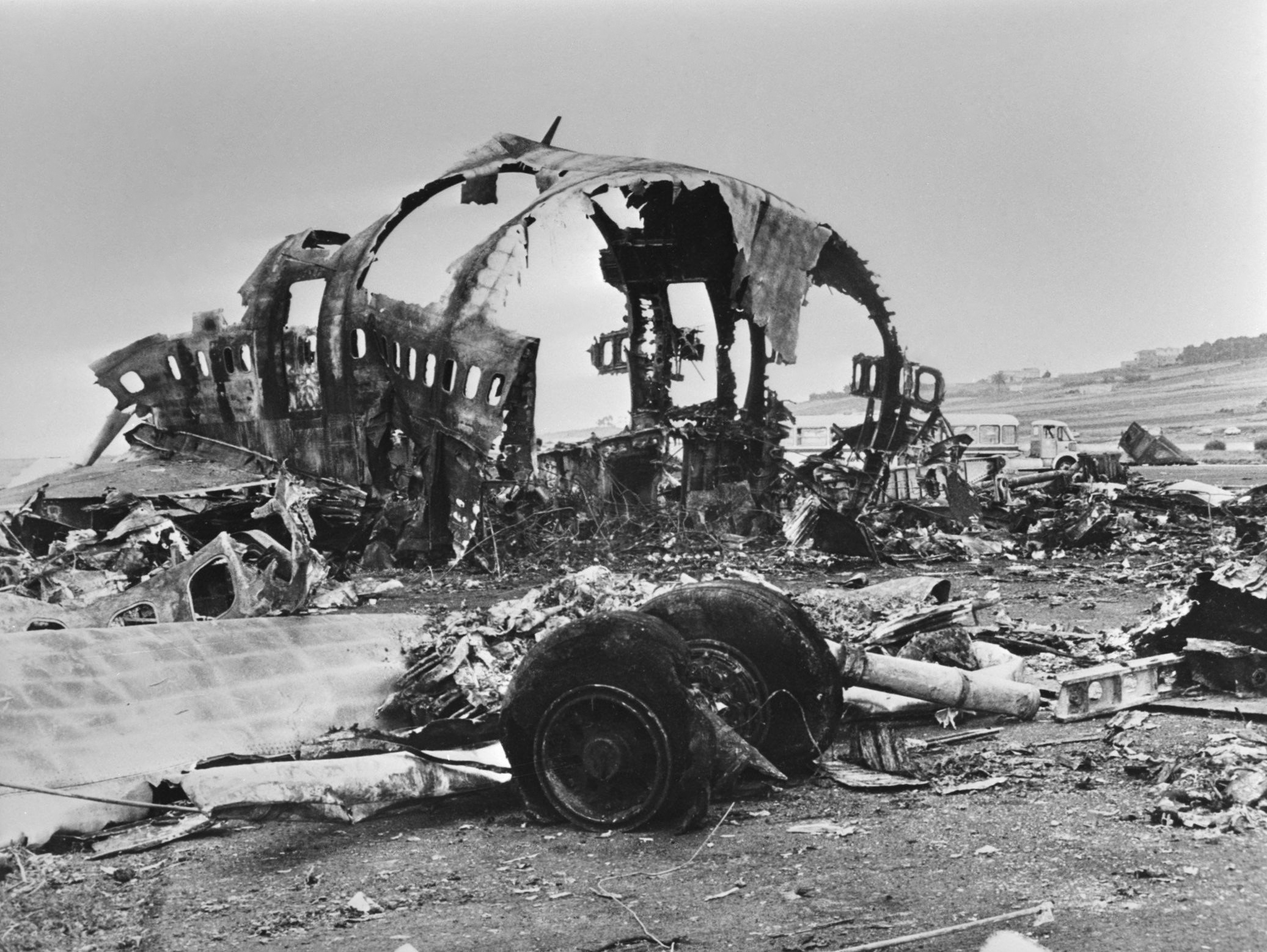
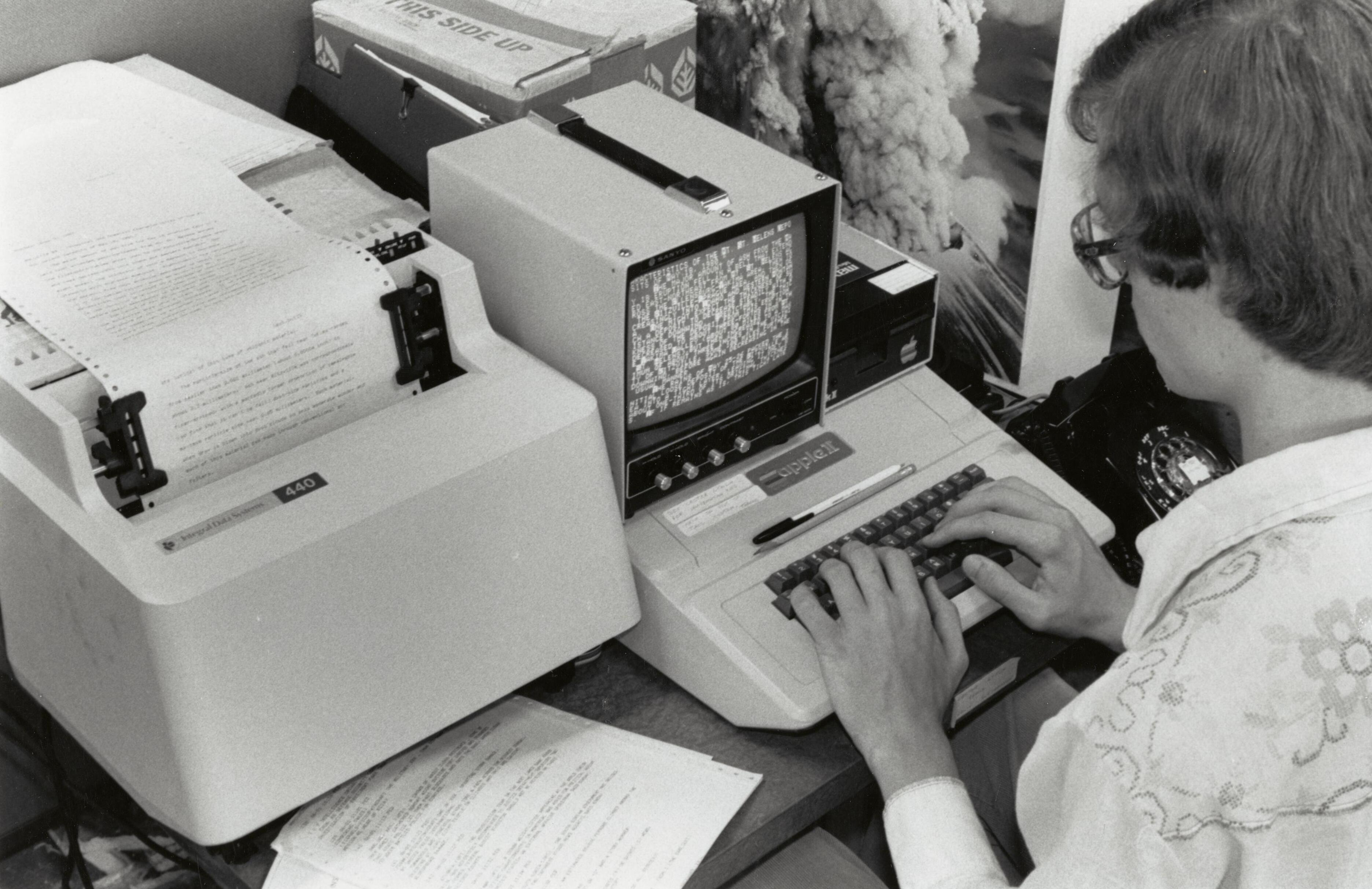
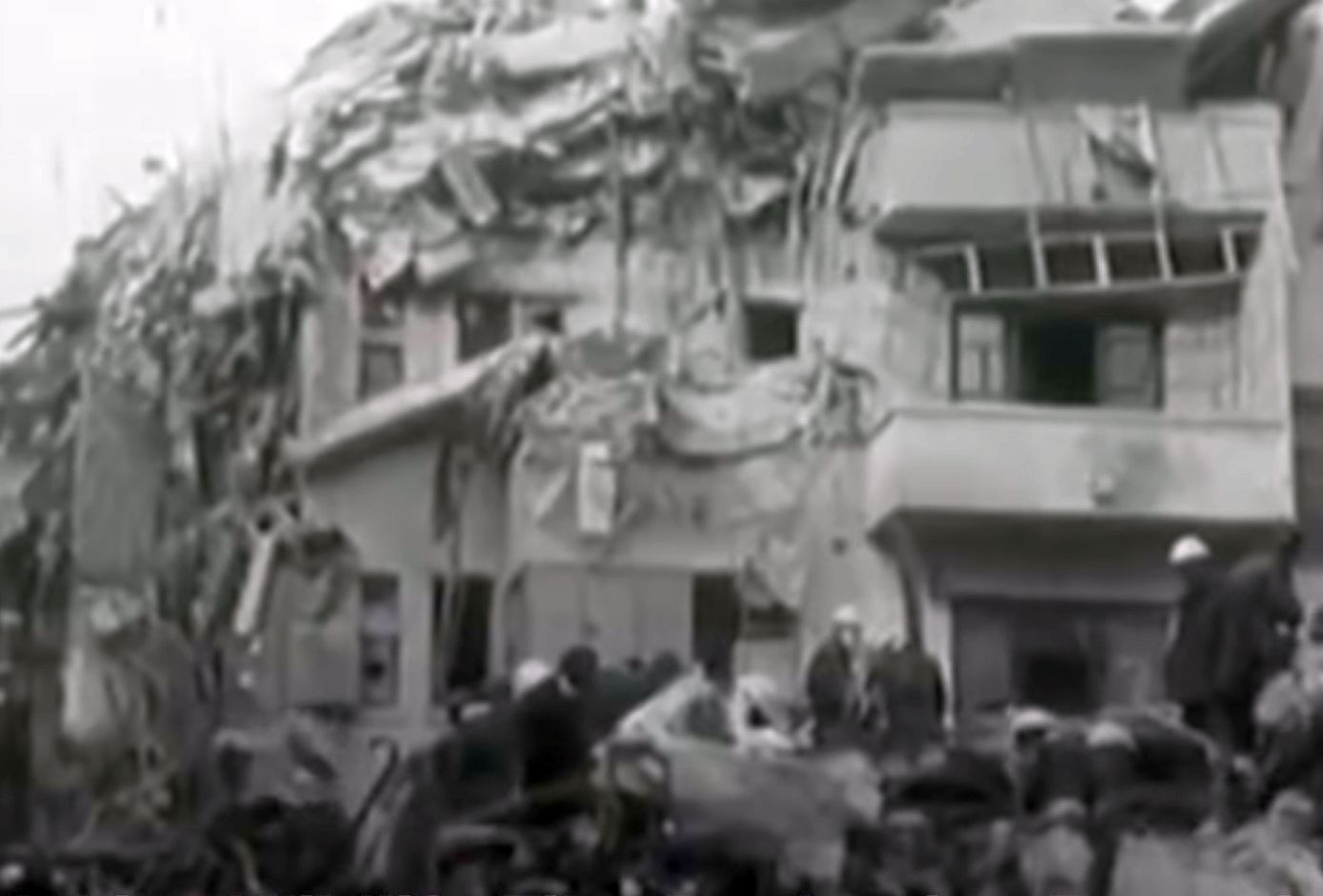
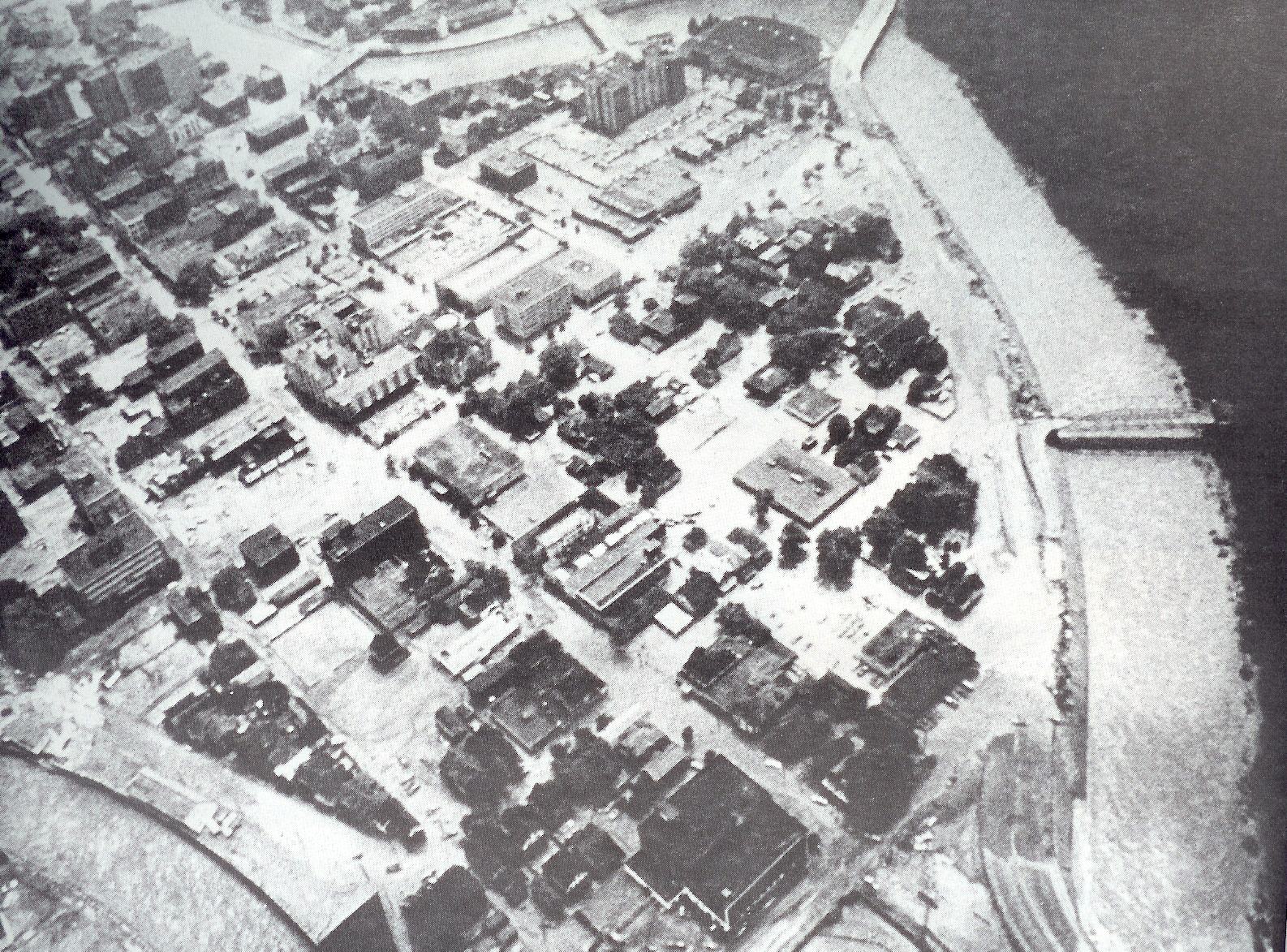
From top to bottom, left to right: Star Wars is released; the Atari Video Computer System is released; Elvis Presley dies at Graceland; the Ogaden War erupts as Somalia invades Ethiopia’s Ogaden region; the Torrijos–Carter Treaties set the framework for Panama Canal transfer; the Tenerife airport disaster kills 583 when two Boeing 747s collide; the Apple II is released; the 1977 Vrancea earthquake in Romania kills thousands and causes widespread destruction; and the Johnstown flood of 1977 kills 84 in Pennsylvania.

1977 (MCMLXXVII) was a common year starting on Saturday of the Gregorian calendar, the 1977th year of the Common Era (CE) and Anno Domini (AD) designations, the 977th year of the 2nd millennium, the 77th year of the 20th century, and the 8th year of the 1970s decade.

== Events ==
=== January ===
- January 8 – Three bombs explode in Moscow within 37 minutes, killing seven. The bombings are attributed to an Armenian separatist group.
- January 10 – Mount Nyiragongo erupts in eastern Zaire (now the Democratic Republic of the Congo).
- January 11 – The first episode of Finnish children's TV show Pikku Kakkonen ("Little Number Two") is aired on Yle TV2.
- January 17 – 49 Navy and Marine enlisted members on a landing craft from the USS Trenton and USS Guam are killed by a collision in Barcelona harbour, Spain.
- January 18
  - Scientists identify a previously unknown bacterium as the cause of the mysterious Legionnaires' disease.
  - Australia's worst railway disaster at Granville, a suburb of Sydney, leaves 83 people dead.
  - SFR Yugoslavia Prime minister Džemal Bijedić, his wife and 6 others are killed in a plane crash in Bosnia and Herzegovina.
- January 19 – An Ejército del Aire CASA C-207C Azor (registration T.7-15) plane crashes into the side of a mountain near Chiva, on approach to Valencia Airport in Spain, killing all 11 people on board.
- January 20 - Jimmy Carter is sworn in as the 39th President of the United States after defeating Gerald Ford in the 1976 election.
- January 23 – Prime Minister Indira Gandhi of India calls for fresh elections to the Lok Sabha, and releases all political prisoners.
- January 24 – The Massacre of Atocha occurs, during the Spanish transition to democracy.

=== February ===
- February 2 – The Congress Party of India, led by Indira Gandhi, splits with Jagjivan Ram and other senior leaders, forming Congress for Democracy. This party later merges with the Janata Party.
- February 3 – In northern Japan a blizzard piles snow on rooftops, causing many to collapse killing at least 31 people.
- February 4 – Eleven CTA commuters are killed when an elevated train derails from the Loop in central Chicago, United States.
- February 7 – The Soviet Union launches Soyuz 24 (Viktor Gorbatko, Yury Glazkov) to dock with the Salyut 5 space station.
- February 18

- American Space Shuttle program: First test flight of Space Shuttle Enterprise mated to the Boeing 747 Shuttle Carrier Aircraft.
- The Xinjiang 61st Regiment Farm fire started during Chinese New Year when a firecracker ignites wreaths to the late Mao Zedong, killing 694 people, mostly children. It remains the deadliest fire in China.

- February 23 – Óscar Romero, an outspoken opponent of violence, becomes Archbishop of San Salvador, El Salvador.
- February 28 – Queen Elizabeth II opens the New Zealand Parliament in person, after Parliament is summoned for a special short session to allow her to deliver the Speech from the Throne.

=== March ===
- March 4 – The 1977 Vrancea earthquake in the Vrancea Mountains of Romania kills over 1,500 people.
- March 8 – The Australian parliament is opened by Elizabeth II in her capacity as Queen of Australia.
- March 9 – Hanafi Siege: Approximately a dozen armed Hanafi Movement members take over 3 buildings in Washington, D.C., killing 1 person and taking 149 hostages (the hostage situation ends 2 days later).
- March 10 – The rings of Uranus are discovered.
- March 12 – The Centenary Test between Australia and England begins at the Melbourne Cricket Ground.
- March 19 – Results of elections to the Indian Parliament are declared. Indira Gandhi's Congress Party is routed by the opposition Janata alliance.
- March 21 – Prime Minister Indira Gandhi withdraws the state of emergency which was implemented on June 25, 1975.
- March 27 – Tenerife disaster: A collision between KLM and Pan Am Boeing 747s at Tenerife, Canary Islands, kills 583 people. This becomes the deadliest accident in aviation history.

=== April ===
- April 2 – Horse racing: Red Rum wins a record third Grand National at Aintree Racecourse in the UK.
- April 4 – Southern Airways Flight 242 crashes on a highway in New Hope, Georgia, United States, killing 72 people.
- April 7 – German Federal Prosecutor Siegfried Buback and his driver are shot by Red Army Faction members while waiting at a red light near his home in Karlsruhe. The "Ulrike Meinhof Commando" later claims responsibility.

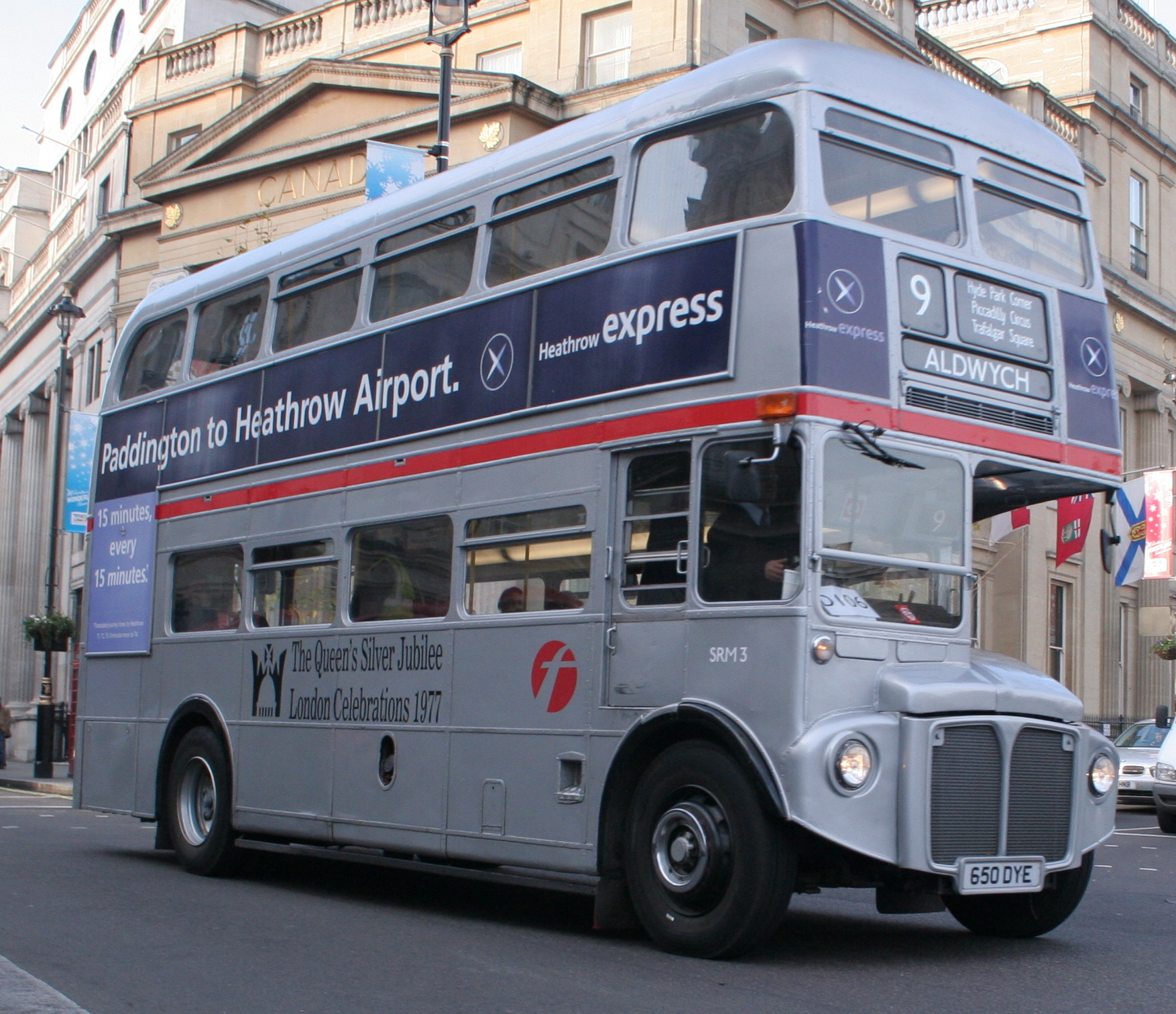
April 11: UK Silver Jubilee (25 red buses painted silver)

- April 9 – Spain legalizes the Communist Party of Spain, which had been outlawed since 1939.
- April 11 – London Transport's Silver Jubilee AEC Routemaster buses are launched.
- April 17 – Belgian prime minister Leo Tindemans' Christian Social Party gains eight seats in the lower house in parliamentary elections.
- April 18 – An annular solar eclipse was visible in Africa, and was the 29th solar eclipse of Solar Saros 138.
- April 24 – In northern Bangladesh, a cyclone kills 13 people and injures about 100 others.
- April 28 – A federal court in Stuttgart, West Germany, sentences Red Army Faction members Andreas Baader, Gudrun Ensslin, and Jan-Carl Raspe to life imprisonment.
- April 30 – The Cold War between Cambodia and Vietnam evolves into the Cambodian–Vietnamese War.

=== May ===
- May 1 – The Taksim Square massacre in Istanbul results in 34 deaths and hundreds of injuries.
- May 12 – Portugal and Israel establish diplomatic relations.
- May 14 – An IAS Cargo Boeing 707 airplane crash in Lusaka, Zambia, kills all six on board.
- May 16 – A 20-passenger S-61L topples sideways at takeoff from the roof of the Pan Am Building in Midtown Manhattan. Four passengers are killed by the turning rotors and a woman at street level is killed by a falling blade.
- May 17 – The Likud Party, led by Menachem Begin, wins the national elections in Israel.
- May 23
  - Scientists report using bacteria in a lab to make insulin via gene splicing.
  - Moluccan terrorists take over a school in Bovensmilde, northern Netherlands (105 hostages), and a passenger train on the Bovensmilde–Assen route nearby (90 hostages) at the same time. The children are released on May 26. On June 11, Dutch Royal Marines storm the train, and six terrorists and two hostages are killed.
- May 25 - Star Wars is released in the United States by director George Lucas. It immediately became a major pop culture phenomenon, and became a major box office hit for the next 6 years.
- May 27
  - The 1977 Aeroflot Ilyushin 62 airplane crash in Cuba kills 69 people.
  - A demonstration and coup attempt in Angola takes place. Thousands are killed by the government and Cuban forces.
- May 28 – The Beverly Hills Supper Club in Southgate, Kentucky, United States, is engulfed in fire; 165 are killed inside.
- May 29 – Indianapolis 500: A. J. Foyt becomes the first driver to win the race four times.

=== June ===
Flag of Djibouti

- June 5 – A bloodless coup installs France-Albert René as President of the Seychelles.
- June 15 – Spain has its first democratic elections, after 41 years of Francoist Spain.
- June 21 – Bülent Ecevit, of CHP forms the new government of Turkey (40th government since the founding of the Turkish republic, but fails to receive the vote of confidence).
- June 25 – The 1977 Rugby League World Cup culminates in Australia's 13–12 victory over Great Britain at the Sydney Cricket Ground before about 24,450 spectators.
- June 27
  - Djibouti receives its independence from France.
  - Constitution for the Federation of Earth is adopted by the second session of the World Constituent Assembly, held at Innsbruck, Austria.
- June 30 – The Southeast Asia Treaty Organization is permanently disbanded.

=== July ===
- July 1
  - The East African Community is dissolved.
  - The Championships, Wimbledon (tennis) – Virginia Wade wins the women's singles title in the centenary year of the tournament, Wade's first and only Wimbledon title and her third and final Grand Slam title overall; she remains the last British woman to win the singles title at Wimbledon.
- July 5 – General Muhammad Zia-ul-Haq overthrows Zulfikar Ali Bhutto, the first elected Prime Minister of Pakistan.
- July 9 – The Pinochet dictatorship in Chile organises the youth event of Acto de Chacarillas, a ritualised act reminiscent of Francoist Spain.
- July 10 – A temperature of 48.0 °C (118.4 °F), a record for continental Europe, is recorded in Greece.
- July 13
  - Somalia declares war on Ethiopia, starting the Ethio-Somali War.
  - New York City is affected by a complete electricity blackout lasting through the following day that results in citywide looting and other criminal activity, including arson.
- July 21–24 – The Libyan–Egyptian War, sparked by a Libyan raid on Sallum, begins.
- July 21 – Süleyman Demirel, of AP forms the new government of Turkey (41st government a three-party coalition, so-called second national front (Turkish: Milliyetçi cephe)).
- July 22 – The purged Chinese Communist leader Deng Xiaoping is restored to power nine months after the "Gang of Four" was expelled from power in a coup d'état.
- July 27 – The Soviet Politburo orders Boris Yeltsin to demolish the Ipatiev House, where Tsar Nicholas II of Russia and his family were shot in 1918. Yeltsin later refers to this as a barbarian act.
- July 30 – Left-wing German terrorists Susanne Albrecht, Brigitte Mohnhaupt and Christian Klar assassinate Jürgen Ponto, chairman of the Dresdner Bank in Oberursel, West Germany.

=== August ===
- August 4 – U.S. president Jimmy Carter signs legislation creating the United States Department of Energy.
- August 9 – The military-controlled government of Uruguay announces that it will return the nation to civilian rule through general elections in 1981 for a president and Congress.
- August 12 – The NASA Space Shuttle, named Enterprise, makes its first test free-flight from the back of a Boeing 747 Shuttle Carrier Aircraft.
- August 15
  - The Big Ear, a radio telescope operated by Ohio State University as part of the SETI project, receives a radio signal from deep space; the event is named the Wow! signal for a notation made by a volunteer on the project.
  - Nazi war criminal Herbert Kappler escapes from the Caelian Hill military hospital in Rome.
- August 17 – The Soviet icebreaker Arktika becomes the first surface ship to reach the North Pole.
- August 20 – Voyager program: The United States launches the Voyager 2 spacecraft.
- August 26 – The National Assembly of Quebec passes the Charter of the French Language (Law 101, La charte de la langue française) making French the official language of the Canadian province of Quebec.

=== September ===
- September 4 – The Golden Dragon massacre, involving rival Chinatown gangs, takes place in San Francisco, United States. Five are killed.
- September 5
  - Voyager program: Voyager 1 is launched after a brief delay.
  - German Autumn: Employers Association President Hanns Martin Schleyer is kidnapped in Cologne, West Germany. The kidnappers kill three escorting police officers and his chauffeur. They demand the release of Red Army Faction prisoners.
- September 7 – Torrijos-Carter treaties: Treaties between Panama and the United States on the status of the Panama Canal are signed. The U.S. agrees to transfer control of the canal to Panama at the end of the 20th century.
- September 8 – Interpol issues a resolution against the copyright infringement of video tapes and other material, which is still cited in warnings on opening pre-credits of videocassettes and DVDs.
- September 10 – Murderer Hamida Djandoubi is the last person executed by guillotine in France (at Marseille) and the last legal beheading in the Western world.
- September 15 – Optical fiber is first used to carry live telephone traffic, as an Italian company in Turin, Centro Studi e Laboratori Telecomunicazioni (CSELT) begins operation of two telephone exchanges.
- September 18 – Courageous (U.S.), skippered by Ted Turner, sweeps the Australian challenger Australia in the 24th America's Cup yacht race at Newport, Rhode Island.
- September 19
  - Under pressure from the Carter Administration, President of Nicaragua Anastasio Somoza Debayle lifts the state of siege in Nicaragua.
  - North Korean agents abduct Yutaka Kume from Noto Peninsula starting the North Korean abductions of Japanese citizens.
- September 20 – The Petrozavodsk phenomenon is observed in the Soviet Union and some northern European countries.
- September 28 – The Porsche 928 debuts at the Geneva Motor Show.

=== October ===
- October 1 – Energy Research and Development Administration combines with the Federal Energy Administration to form United States Department of Energy.
- October 7
  - The Soviet Union adopts its third Constitution. The Soviet National Anthem's lyrics are returned after a 24-year period, with Joseph Stalin's name omitted.
  - Pelé plays his final professional football game, as a member of the New York Cosmos.
- October 13 – German Autumn: Four Palestinians hijack Lufthansa Flight 181 to Somalia and demand the release of 11 Red Army Faction members.
- October 17–18 – German Autumn: GSG 9 troopers storm the hijacked Lufthansa passenger plane in Mogadishu, Somalia; three of the four hijackers die.
- October 18 – German Autumn: Red Army Faction members Andreas Baader, Jan-Carl Raspe and Gudrun Ensslin commit suicide in Stammheim prison; Irmgard Möller fails (their supporters still claim they were murdered). They are buried on October 27.
- October 19 – German Autumn: Kidnapped industrialist Hanns Martin Schleyer is found murdered in Mulhouse, France.
- October 20 – Three members of the rock band Lynyrd Skynyrd die in a charter plane crash outside Gillsburg, Mississippi, three days after the release of their fifth studio album Street Survivors.
- October 21 – The European Patent Institute is founded.
- October 23 – The president of Catalonia, Josep Tarradellas, returns to Barcelona from exile and the autonomous government of Catalonia, the Generalitat, is restored.
- October 26
  - The last natural smallpox case is discovered in Merca district, Somalia. The WHO and the CDC consider this date the anniversary of the eradication of smallpox, a great success of vaccination and, by extension, of modern science.
  - Space Shuttle program: Last test taxi flight of Space Shuttle Enterprise, over California.
- October 27 – British punk band Sex Pistols release Never Mind the Bollocks, Here's the Sex Pistols on the Virgin Records label. Despite refusal by major retailers in the UK to stock it, it enters the UK Album Charts at number one the week after its release.
- October 28 – Hong Kong police attack the ICAC headquarters.

=== November ===
- November 1 – 2060 Chiron, first of the outer Solar System asteroids known as Centaurs, is discovered by Charlie Kowal.

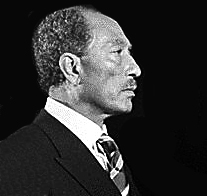
November 19: Anwar Sadat meets Menachem Begin in Israel.

November 22: TCP/IP links 3 of 111 ARPANET nodes.

- November 2 – The worst storm in Athens' modern history causes havoc across the Greek capital and kills 38 people.
- November 6 – The Kelly Barnes Dam, located above Toccoa Falls Bible College near Toccoa, Georgia, United States, fails, killing 39 people.
- November 8
  - Greek archaeologist Manolis Andronikos discovers the tomb of Philip II of Macedon at Vergina.
  - San Francisco elects City Supervisor Harvey Milk, the first openly gay elected official of any large city in the U.S.
- November 9 – Gen. Hugo Banzer, president of the military government of Bolivia, announces that the constitutional democracy will be restored in 1978 instead of 1980 as previously provided.
- November 19
  - Egyptian President Anwar Sadat becomes the first Arab leader to make an official visit to Israel, when he meets with Israeli prime minister Menachem Begin, seeking a permanent peace settlement.
  - TAP Portugal Flight 425 crashes at Madeira Airport, Funchal, Portugal, killing 131 and leaving 33 survivors.
- November 22
  - British Airways inaugurates regular London to New York City supersonic Concorde service.
  - The TCP/IP test succeeds, connecting 3 ARPANET nodes (of 111), in what eventually becomes the Internet protocol. See Packet Radio Van
- November 30 – The International Fund for Agricultural Development (IFAD) is founded as a specialized agency of the United Nations.

=== December ===
- December – The Colombo Plan for Co-operative Economic and Social Development in Asia and the Pacific (CESDAP) is implemented.
- December 4
  - Jean-Bédel Bokassa, president of the Central African Republic, crowns himself emperor.
  - Malaysian Airline System Flight 653 is hijacked and crashes in Tanjung Kupang, Johor, Malaysia, killing all 100 passengers and crew on board.
- December 6 – South Africa grants independence to Bophuthatswana, although it is not recognized by any other country.
- December 10 – 1977 Australian federal election: Malcolm Fraser's Liberal/National Country Coalition government is re-elected with a slightly reduced majority, defeating the Labor Party led by former Prime Minister Gough Whitlam. Consequently, Whitlam resigns as ALP leader after holding the job for nearly 11 years; he is replaced by former treasurer Bill Hayden.
- December 13 – a chartered Douglas DC-3 aircraft carrying the University of Evansville basketball team to Nashville, Tennessee, crashes in rain and dense fog about 90 seconds after takeoff from Evansville Regional Airport; 29 people die in the crash, including 14 members of the team and head coach Bob Watson.
- December 18 – SA de Transport Aérien Flight 730, an international charter service from Zurich to Funchal Airport (Madeira), hits the sea during a landing attempt. Many of the 36 who die drown, trapped inside the sinking aircraft. Twenty-one people survive with the help of rescuers and by swimming to the shore.
- December 19 – The M_{w} 5.9 Bob–Tangol earthquake rocks Iran, killing at least 584 people and injuring 1,000.
- December 20 – Djibouti and Vietnam join the United Nations.
- December 22 – A grain elevator explodes in Westwego, Louisiana, United States, killing 36 people.

== Births ==
=== January ===
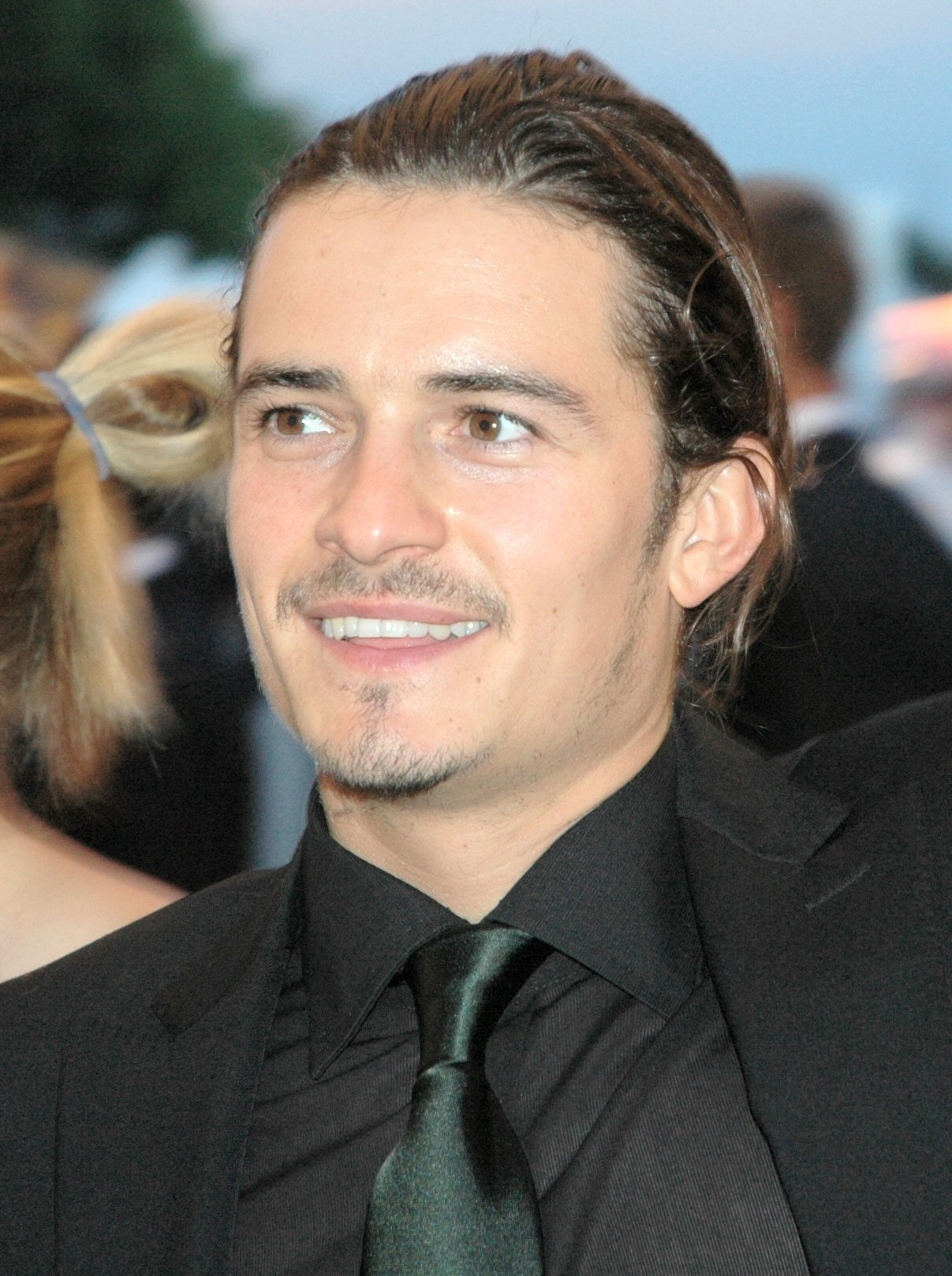
Orlando Bloom

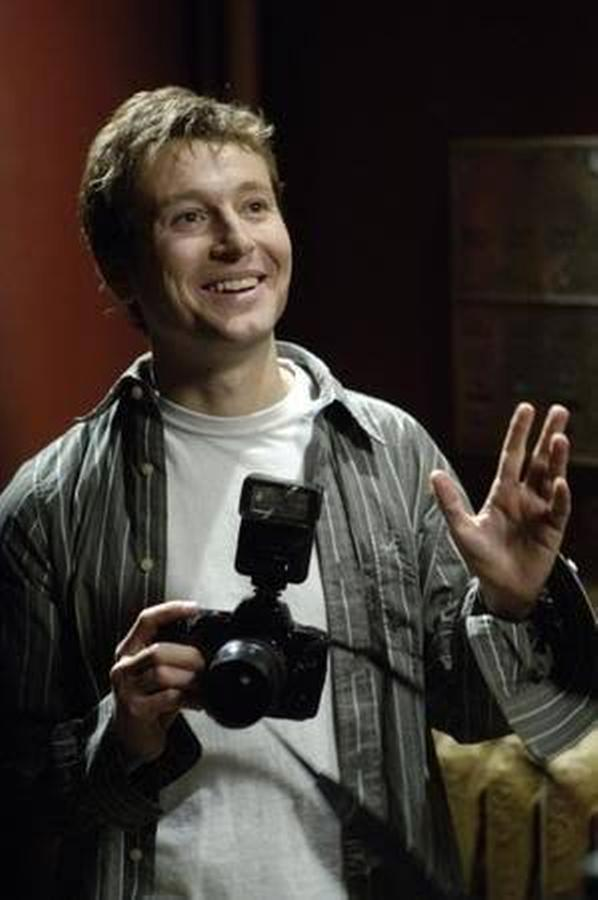
Leigh Whannell

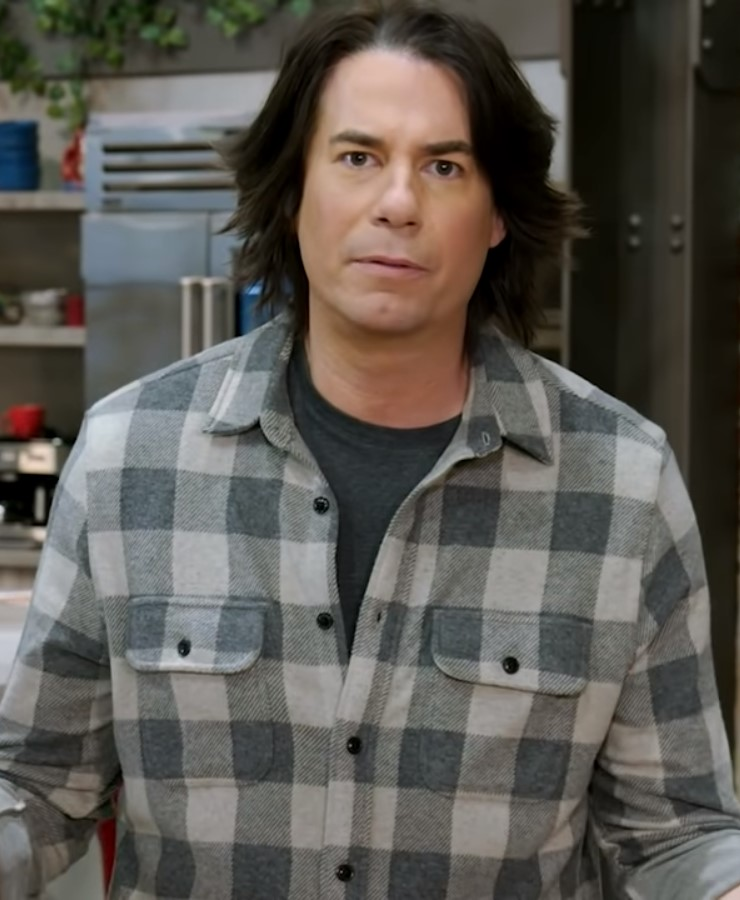
Jerry Trainor

- January 1 – Hasan Salihamidžić, Bosnian footballer
- January 3 – Mayumi Iizuka, Japanese voice actress
- January 4 – Irán Castillo, Mexican actress and singer
- January 10 - Michelle O'Neill, Northern Irish politician, First Minister of Northern Ireland
- January 11
  - Anni Friesinger-Postma, German speed skater
  - Devin Ratray, American actor
- January 13 – Orlando Bloom, British actor
- January 14 – Narain Karthikeyan, Indian Formula One driver
- January 15 – Giorgia Meloni, Italian politician
- January 17 – Leigh Whannell, Australian actor and writer
- January 21 – Jerry Trainor, American actor, comedian and musician
- January 22 – Hidetoshi Nakata, Japanese footballer
- January 25 – Hatem Trabelsi, Tunisian footballer
- January 26 – Vince Carter, American basketball player
- January 28 – Takuma Sato, Japanese racing driver
- January 31
  - Bobby Moynihan, American actor, comedian, producer and writer
  - Kerry Washington, African-American actress

=== February ===
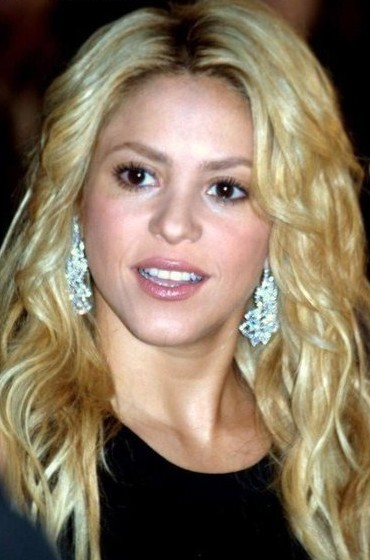
Shakira

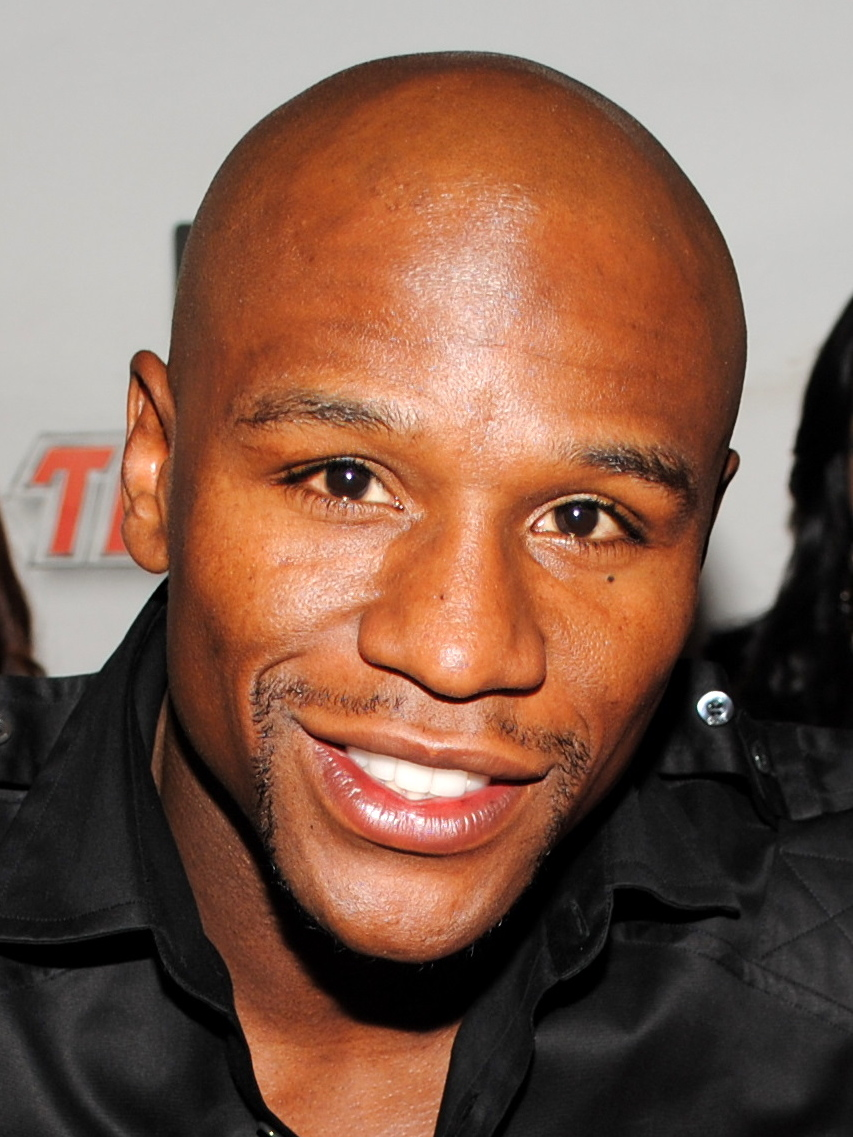
Floyd Mayweather Jr.

- February 2 – Shakira, Colombian singer-songwriter and musician
- February 5 – Ben Ainslie, British sailor
- February 7 – Mariusz Pudzianowski, Polish strongman
- February 11 – Mike Shinoda, American musician, singer and rapper
- February 18
  - Ike Barinholtz, American actor, comedian and screenwriter
  - László Nemes, Hungarian film director and screenwriter
- February 19 – Gianluca Zambrotta, Italian footballer
- February 20
  - Stephon Marbury, American basketball player
  - Gail Kim, Canadian professional wrestler and actress
- February 21 – Jonathan Safran Foer, American author
- February 23 – Kristina Šmigun-Vähi, Estonian skier
- February 24 – Floyd Mayweather Jr., American boxing champion
- February 25 – Hakan Yakin, Turkish football player and coach
- February 26
  - Olsi Baze, columnist, writer and human rights activist.
  - Shane Williams, Welsh rugby player
- February 28
  - Jason Aldean, American country music singer
  - Rafael Amaya, Mexican model, singer, and actor

=== March ===
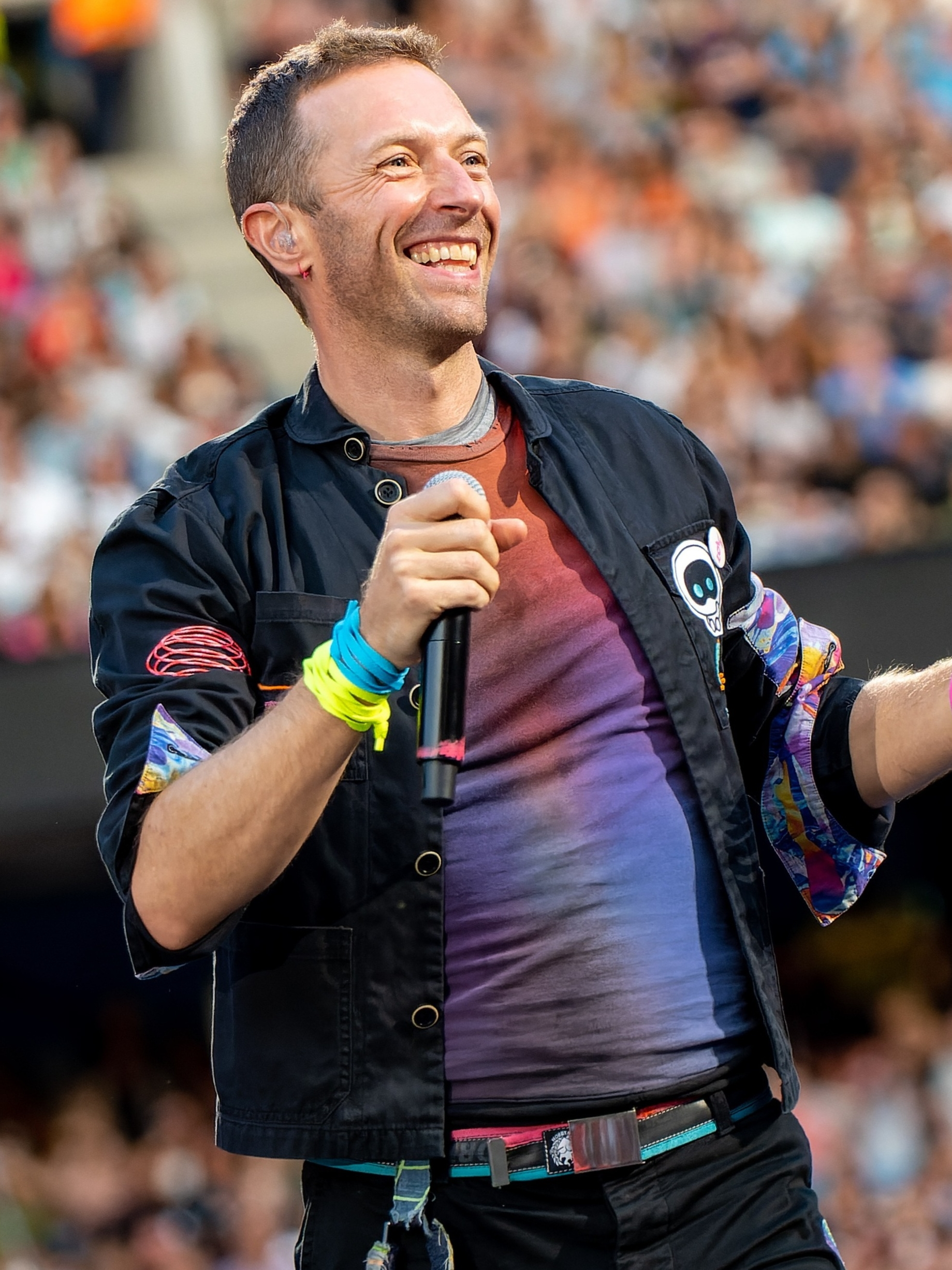
Chris Martin

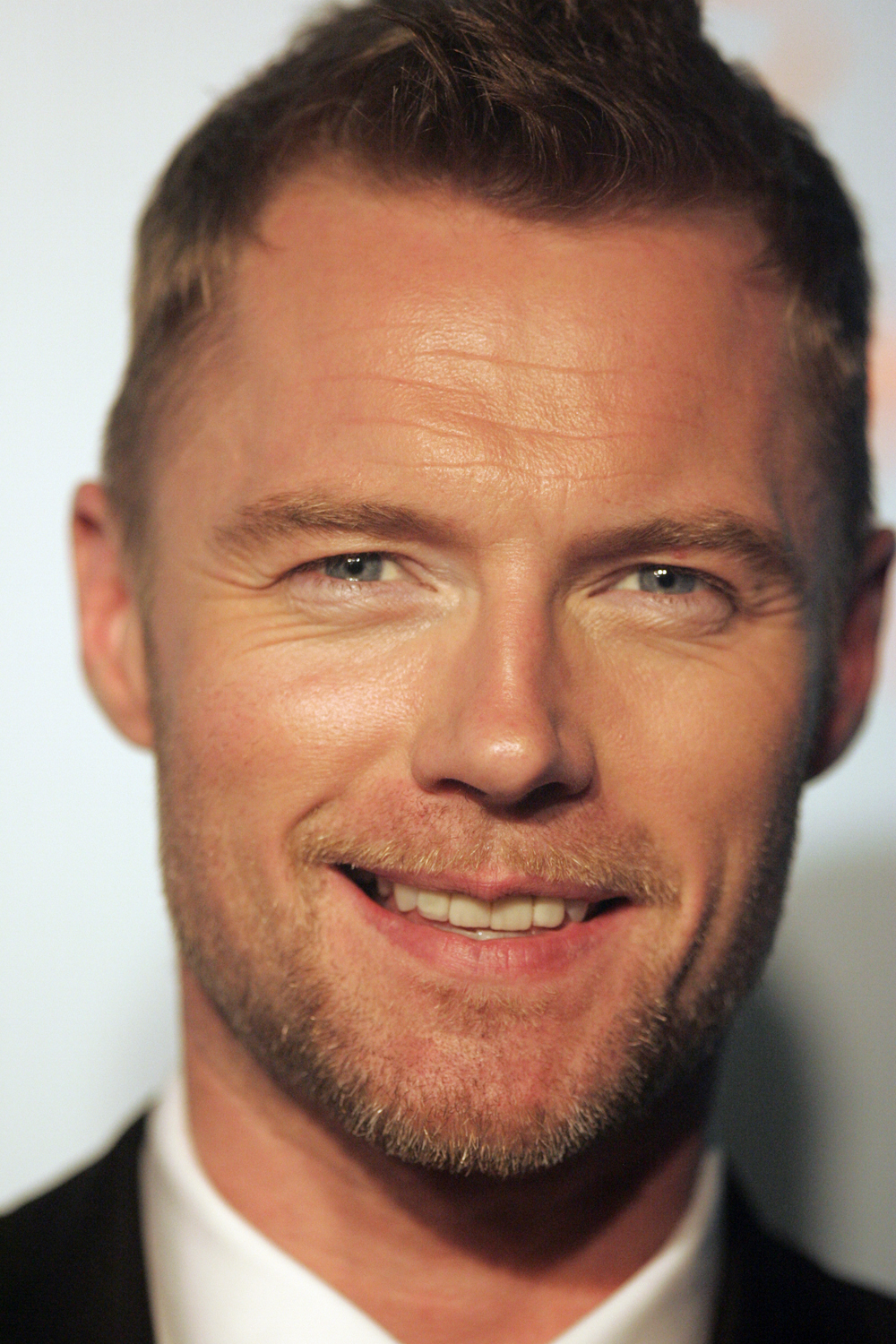
Ronan Keating

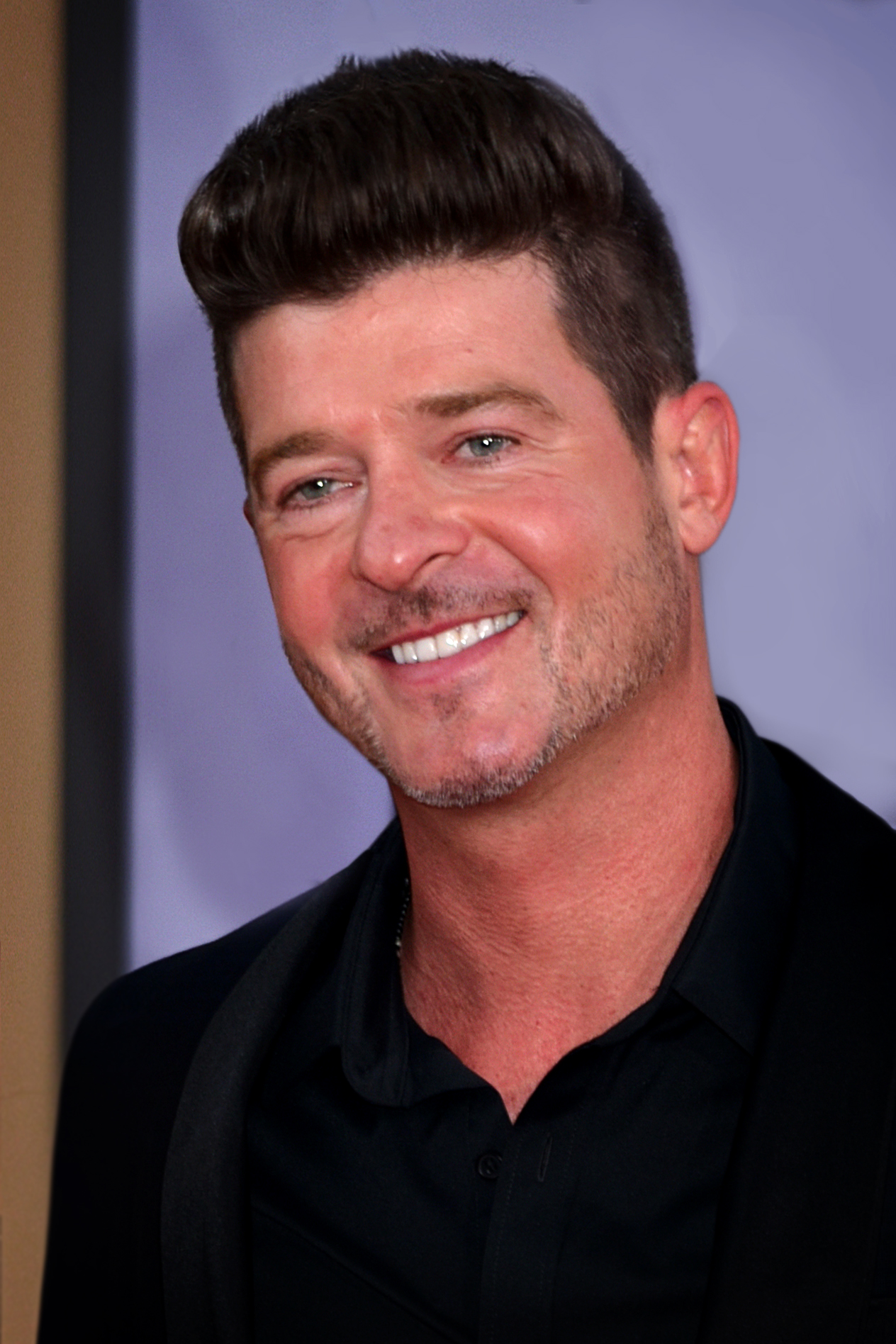
Robin Thicke

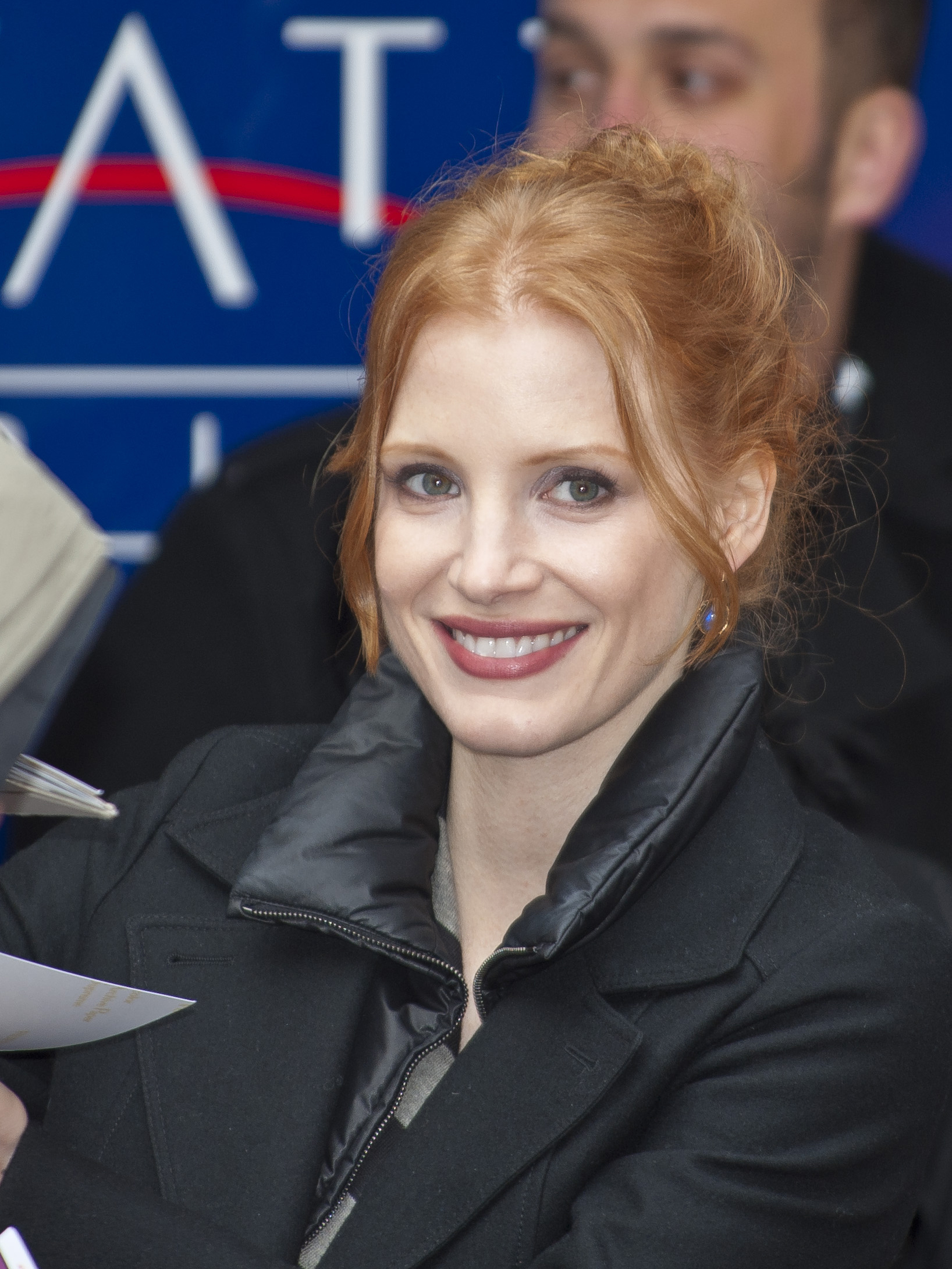
Jessica Chastain

- March 1 – Rens Blom, Dutch athlete
- March 2 – Chris Martin, British rock musician
- March 3 – Ronan Keating, Irish singer
- March 4 – Ana Guevara, Mexican track and field athlete and politician
- March 6
  - Paquillo Fernández, Spanish race walker
  - Santino Marella, Canadian professional wrestler
- March 7
  - Ronan O'Gara, Irish rugby player
- March 8 – James Van Der Beek, American actor (d. 2026)
- March 9
  - Peter Enckelman, Finnish footballer
  - Shannon Miller, American gymnast
- March 10 – Robin Thicke, American-Canadian R&B singer-songwriter and actor
- March 11 – Becky Hammon, American basketball player
- March 14
  - Matthew Booth, South African footballer
  - Naoki Matsuda, Japanese footballer (d. 2011)
  - Kim Nam-il, South Korean footballer
- March 15 – Brian Tee, Japanese American actor
- March 16 – Mónica Cruz, Spanish actress and dancer
- March 18
  - Arkady Babchenko, Russian journalist
  - Zdeno Chára, Slovak ice hockey player
  - Willy Sagnol, French football player and coach
- March 19 – Robert Lindstedt, Swedish tennis player
- March 24 – Jessica Chastain, American actress
- March 25 – Édgar Ramírez, Venezuelan actor
- March 28 – Annie Wersching, American actress (d. 2023)

=== April ===
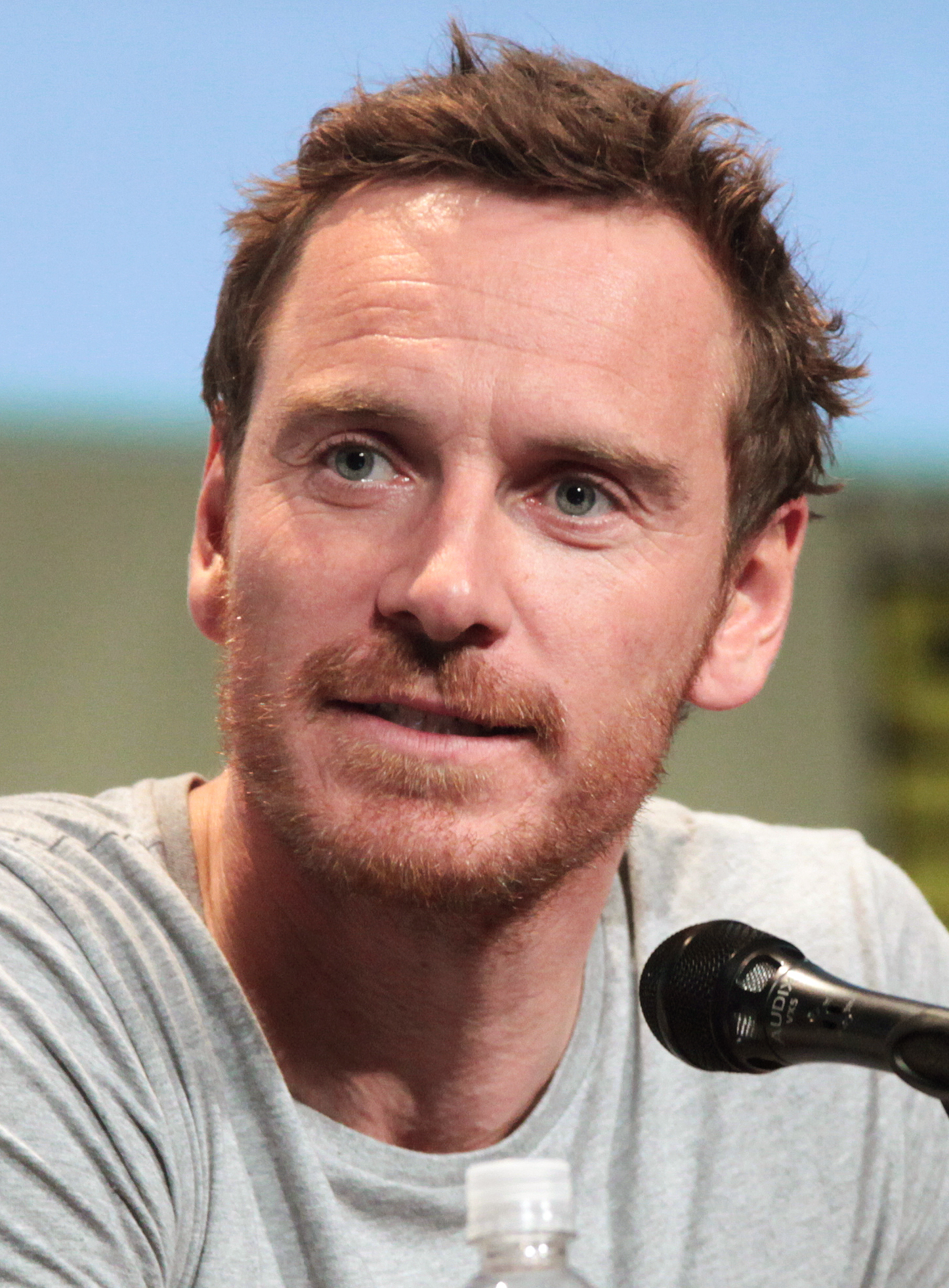
Michael Fassbender

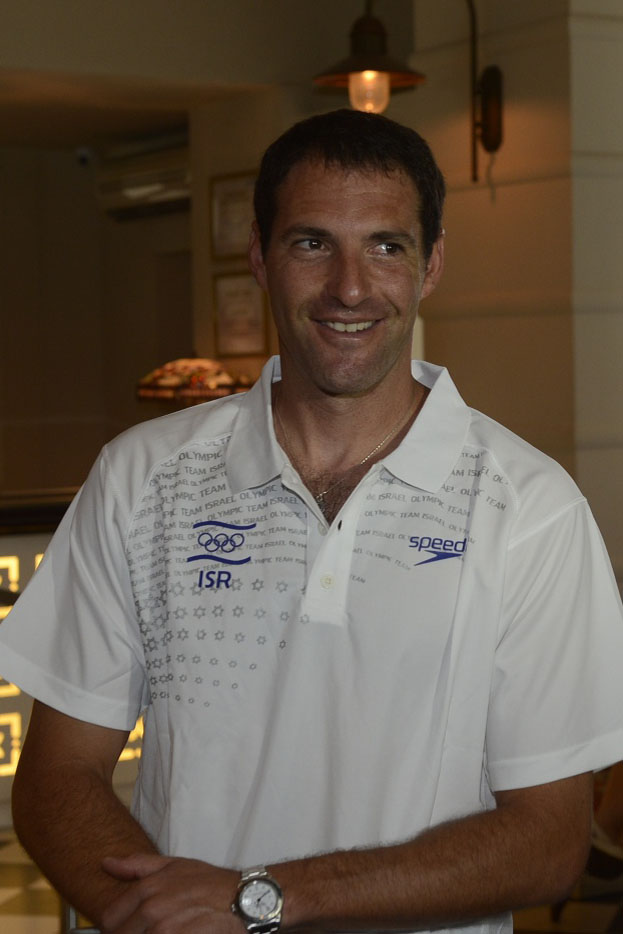
Jonathan Erlich

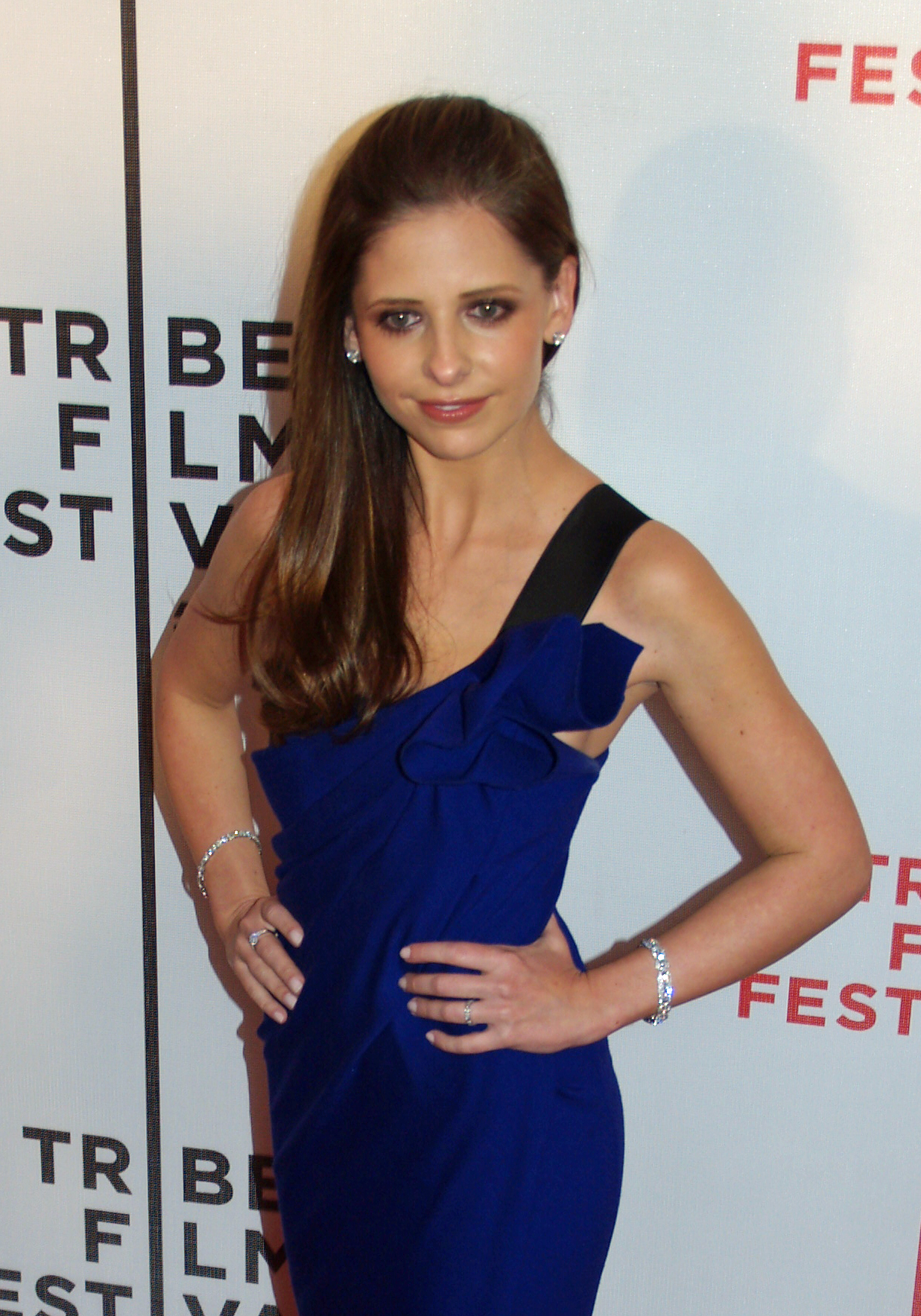
Sarah Michelle Gellar

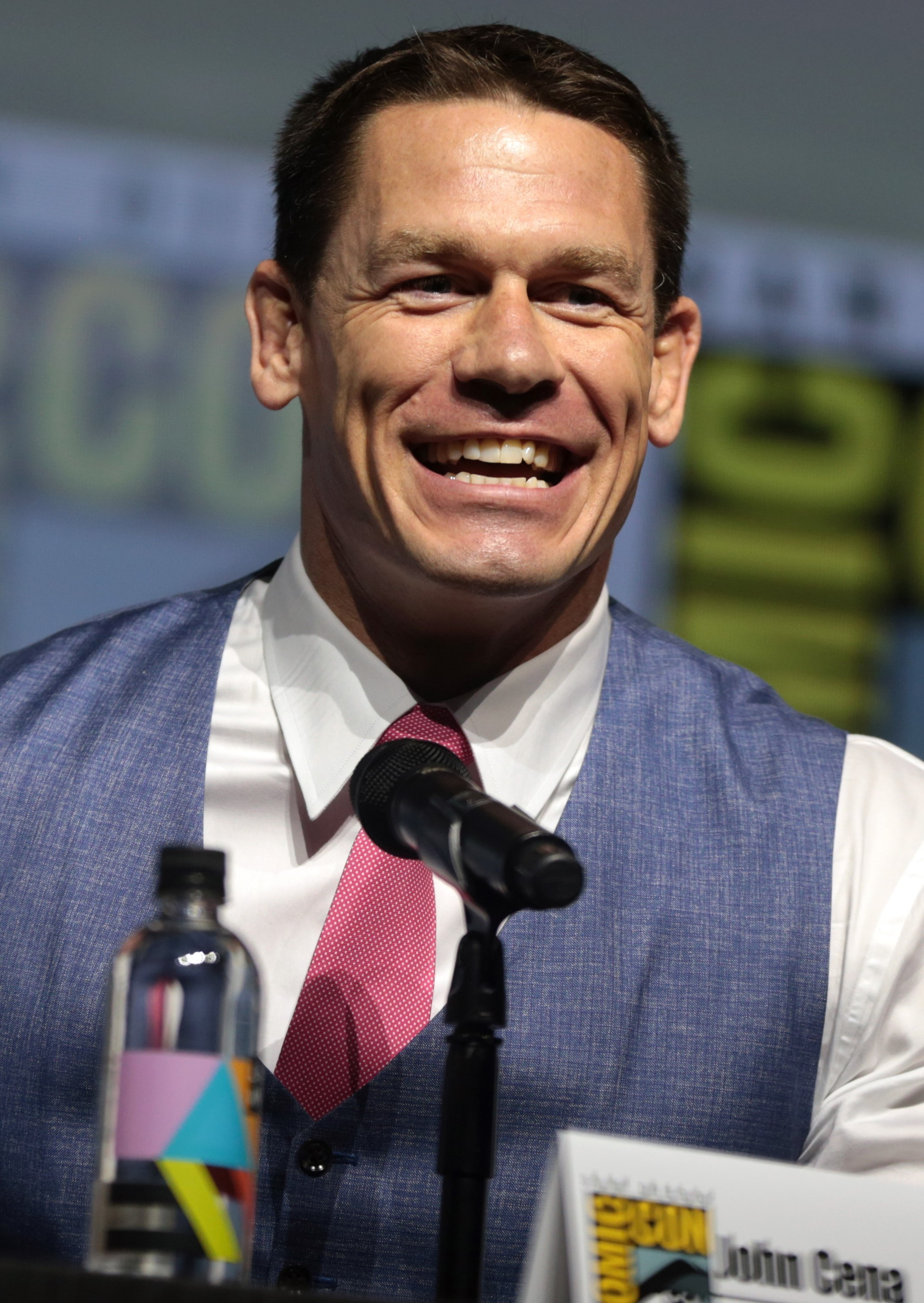
John Cena

- April 1 – Vitor Belfort, Brazilian mixed martial artist
- April 2
  - Michael Fassbender, Irish-German actor
  - Nicki Pedersen, Danish speedway rider
- April 5
  - Jonathan Erlich, Israeli tennis player
  - Daniel Majstorović, Swedish soccer player
- April 9 – Gerard Way, American musician and comic book writer
- April 10 – Cristiano Zanetti, Italian footballer
- April 12
  - Tobias Angerer, German cross-country skier
  - Gemma Mengual, Spanish synchronised swimmer
- April 14
  - Sarah Michelle Gellar, American actress
  - Rob McElhenney, American actor
- April 16 – Freddie Ljungberg, Swedish footballer
- April 17 – Frederik Magle, Danish composer, concert organist, and pianist
- April 21 – Jamie Salé, Canadian figure skater
- April 22
  - Mark van Bommel, Dutch football player and coach
  - Steven Price, British film composer
- April 23
  - Arash, Iranian-Swedish singer, entertainer and producer
  - John Cena, American professional wrestler, actor and rapper
  - John Oliver, British-American comedian and host
  - Kal Penn, American actor, producer, and former civil servant
  - Matt Huuki, American politician and former member of the Michigan House of Representatives in 2011 and 2012
- April 24
  - Carlos Beltrán, Puerto Rican baseball player
  - Rebecca Mader, English actress
- April 25 – Manolo Cardona, Colombian actor
- April 26
  - Jason Earles, American actor, comedian, and martial artist
  - Tom Welling, American actor, director, producer, and model
- April 30 – Alexandra Holden, American actress

=== May ===
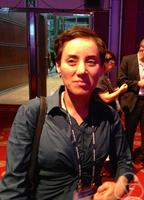
Maryam Mirzakhani

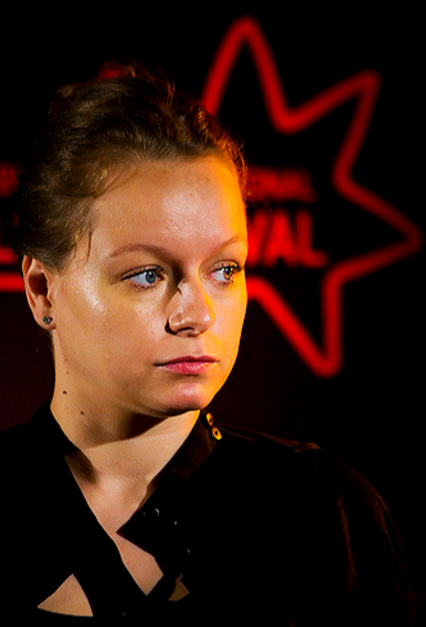
Samantha Morton

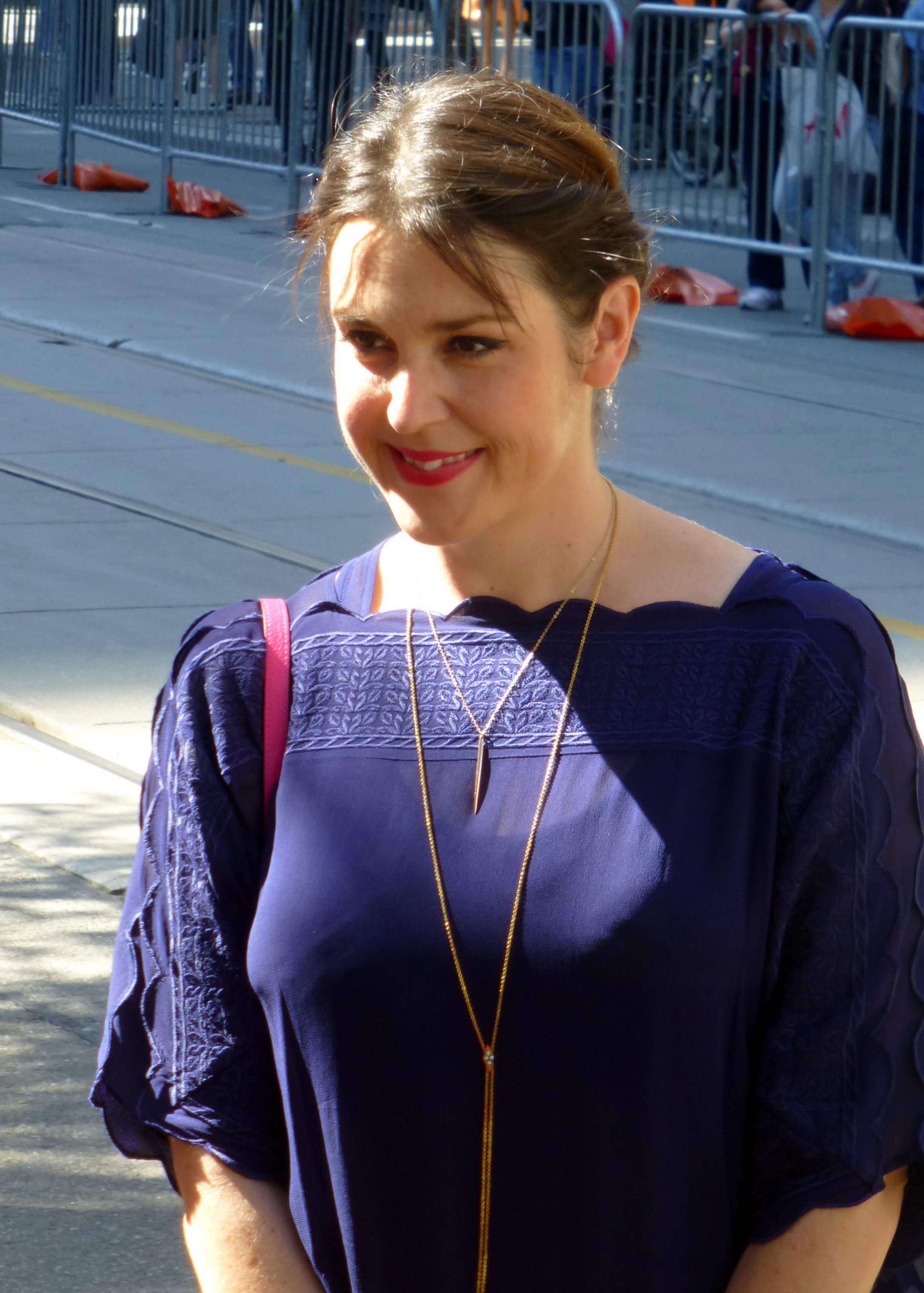
Melanie Lynskey

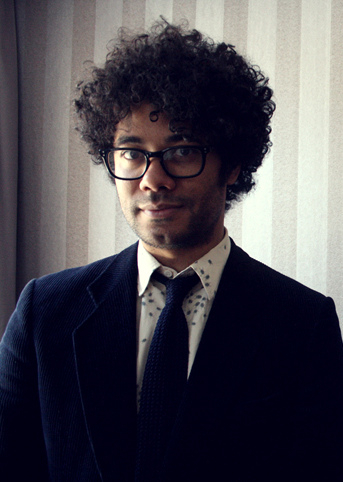
Richard Ayoade

- May 4 – Emily Perkins, Canadian actress
- May 5
  - Choi Kang-hee, South Korean actress
  - Virginie Efira, Belgian actress and television anchor
  - Jessica Schwarz, German film and television actress
- May 9 – Marek Jankulovski, Czech footballer
- May 10 – Nick Heidfeld, German racing driver
- May 11
  - Janne Ahonen, Finnish ski jumper
  - Victor Matfield, South African rugby player
- May 12 – Maryam Mirzakhani, Iranian mathematician (d. 2017)
- May 13
  - Samantha Morton, English actress
  - Tarik Sektioui, Moroccan footballer
- May 14 – Roy Halladay, American baseball player (d. 2017)
- May 16
  - Melanie Lynskey, New Zealand actress
  - Emilíana Torrini, Icelandic singer
- May 23
  - Richard Ayoade, British actor and presenter
  - Ilia Kulik, Russian figure skater
  - Yevgeny Rodionov, Russian soldier (d. 1996)
- May 24
  - Jeet Gannguli, Indian singer, music director and score composer
  - Tamarine Tanasugarn, Thai tennis player
- May 25 – Alberto Del Rio, Mexican professional wrestler
- May 26 – Luca Toni, Italian footballer
- May 27
  - Abderrahmane Hammad, Algerian athlete
  - Tommie van der Leegte, Dutch soccer player
- May 29 – Massimo Ambrosini, Italian football player
- May 30 – Katharina Slanina, German politician
- May 31
  - Domenico Fioravanti, Italian swimmer
  - Moses Sichone, Zambian footballer

=== June ===
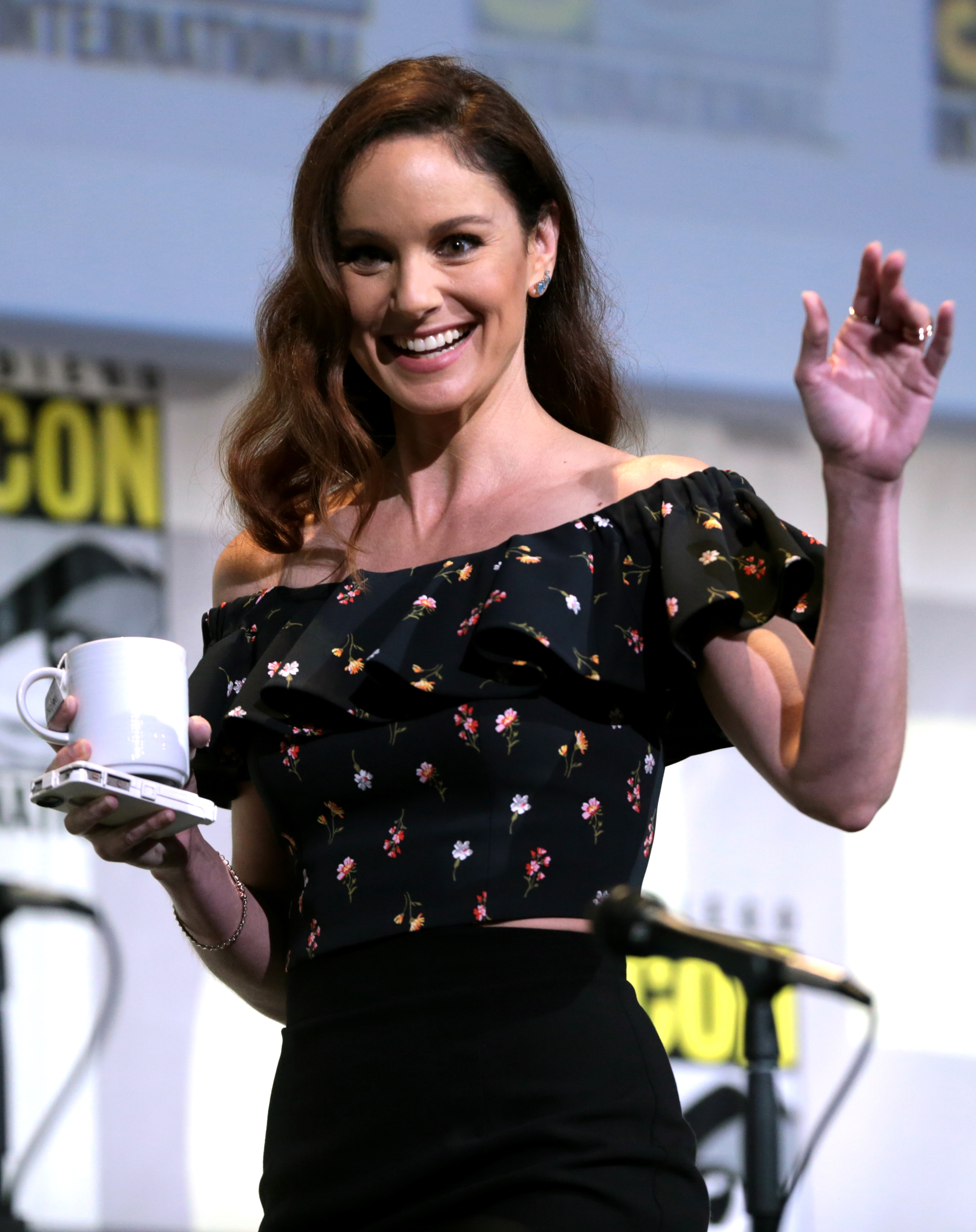
Sarah Wayne Callies

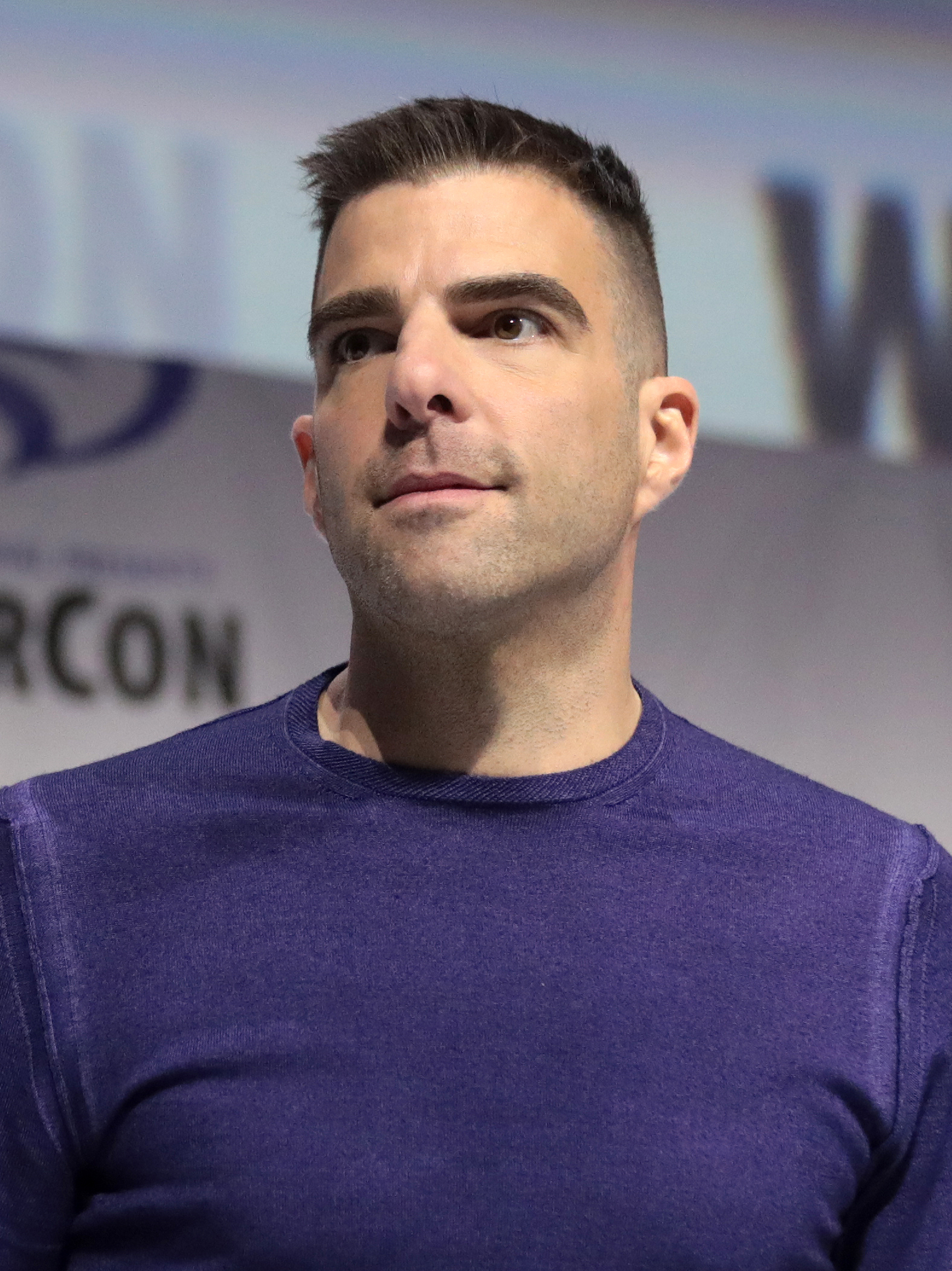
Zachary Quinto

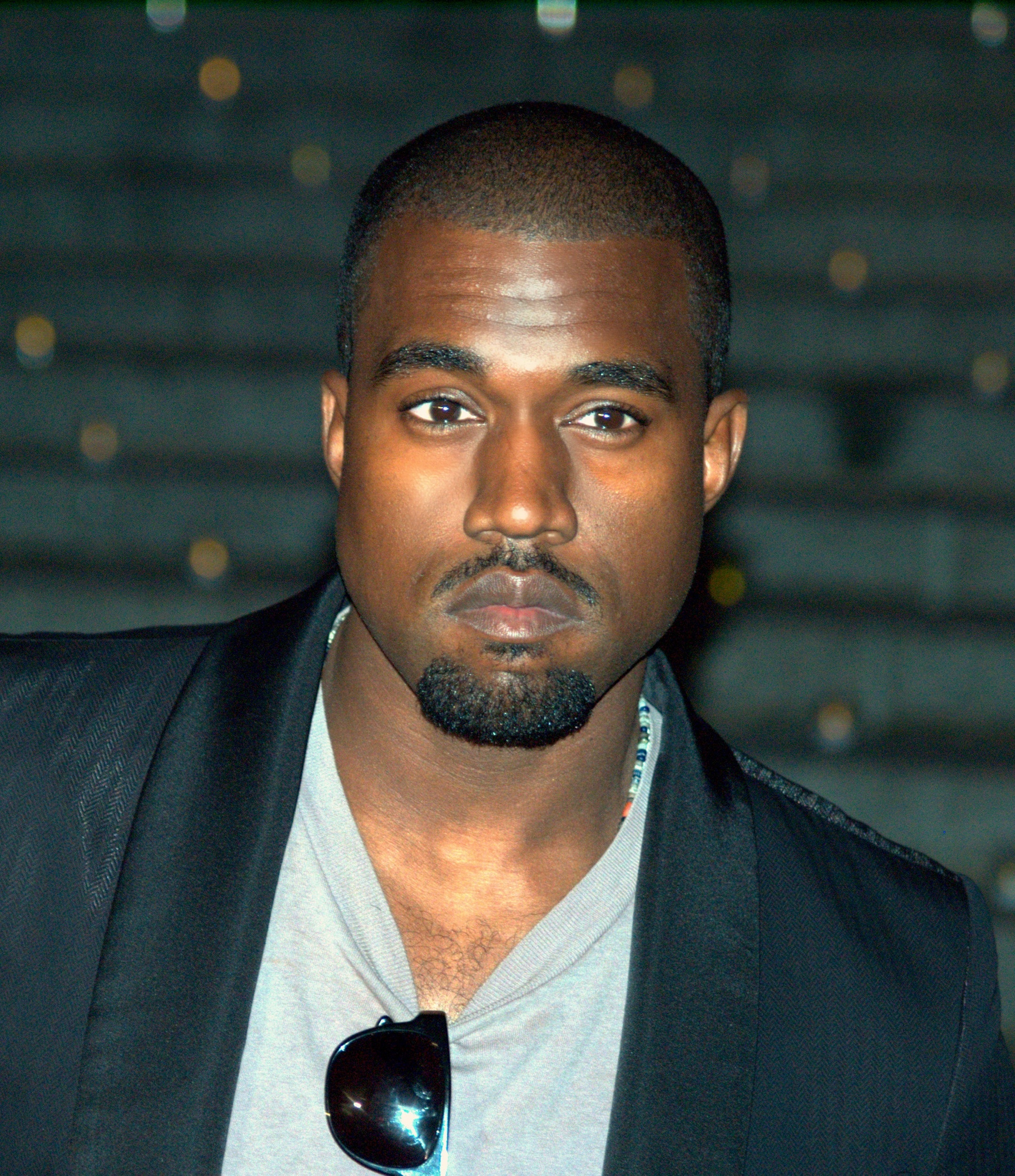
Kanye West

- June 1
  - Sarah Wayne Callies, American actress
  - Jónsi, Icelandic singer
- June 2 – Zachary Quinto, American actor
- June 7
  - Chen Luyun, Chinese basketball player (d. 2015)
  - Donovan Ricketts, Jamaican footballer
- June 8 – Kanye West, American rapper and record producer
- June 9 – Peja Stojaković, Serbian basketball player
- June 11
  - Kim Hee-sun, South Korean actress
  - Geoff Ogilvy, Australian golfer
- June 12 – Ana Tijoux, French-Chilean musician
- June 17 – Bartosz Brożek, Polish philosopher and jurist
- June 18 – Kaja Kallas, 19th prime minister of Estonia
- June 21 – Jochen Hecht, German ice hockey player
- June 23 – Jason Mraz, American singer-songwriter
- June 24 – Amir Talai, American actor
- June 25
  - Layla El, English dancer, model, and retired professional wrestler
  - Naoya Tsukahara, Japanese gymnast
- June 26
  - William Kipsang, Kenyan long-distance runner
  - Tite Kubo, Japanese manga artist who created BLEACH
- June 27
  - Arkadiusz Radomski, Polish footballer
  - Raúl, Spanish footballer
- June 29 – Zuleikha Robinson, British actress
- June 30 – Justo Villar, Paraguayan footballer

=== July ===
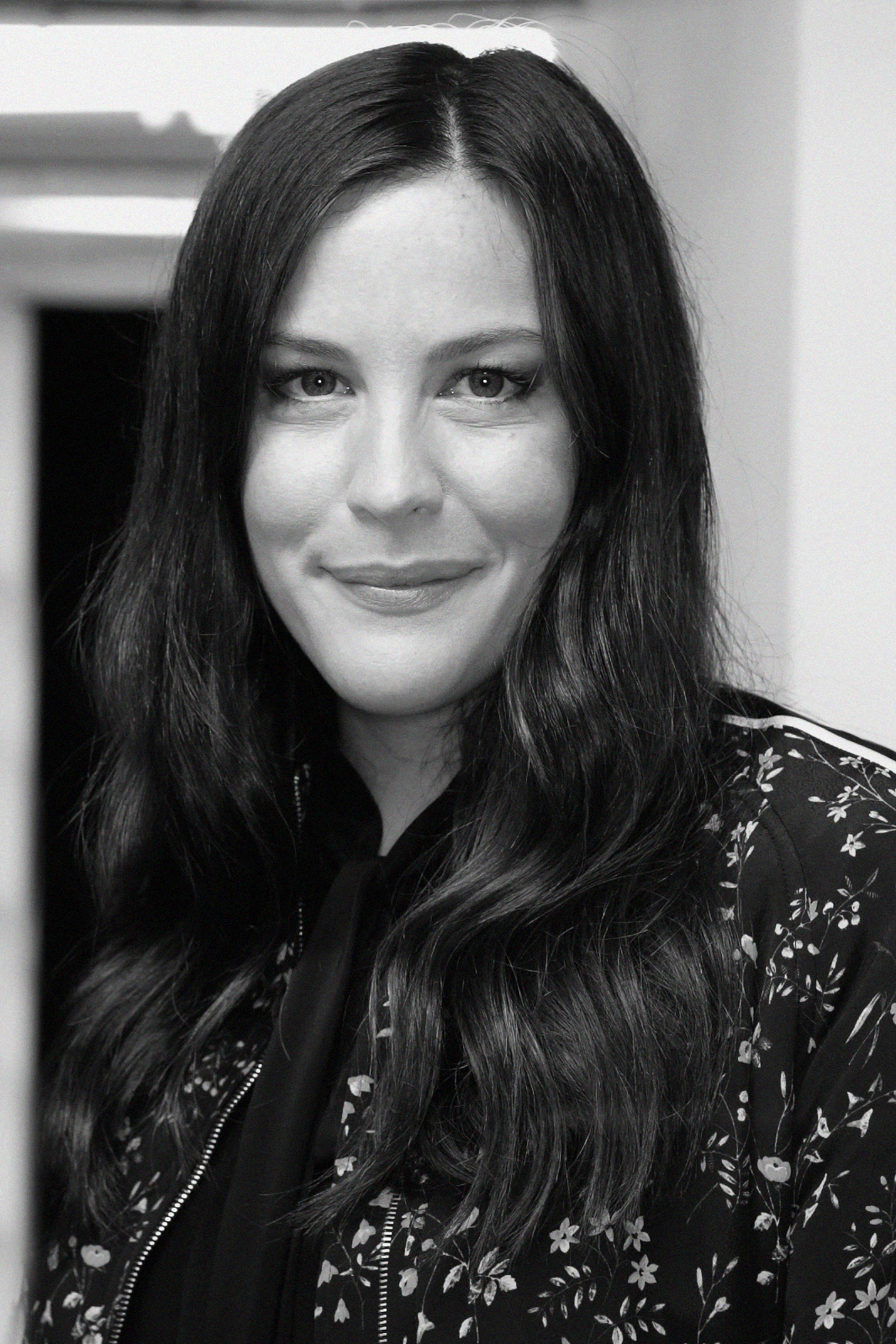
Liv Tyler

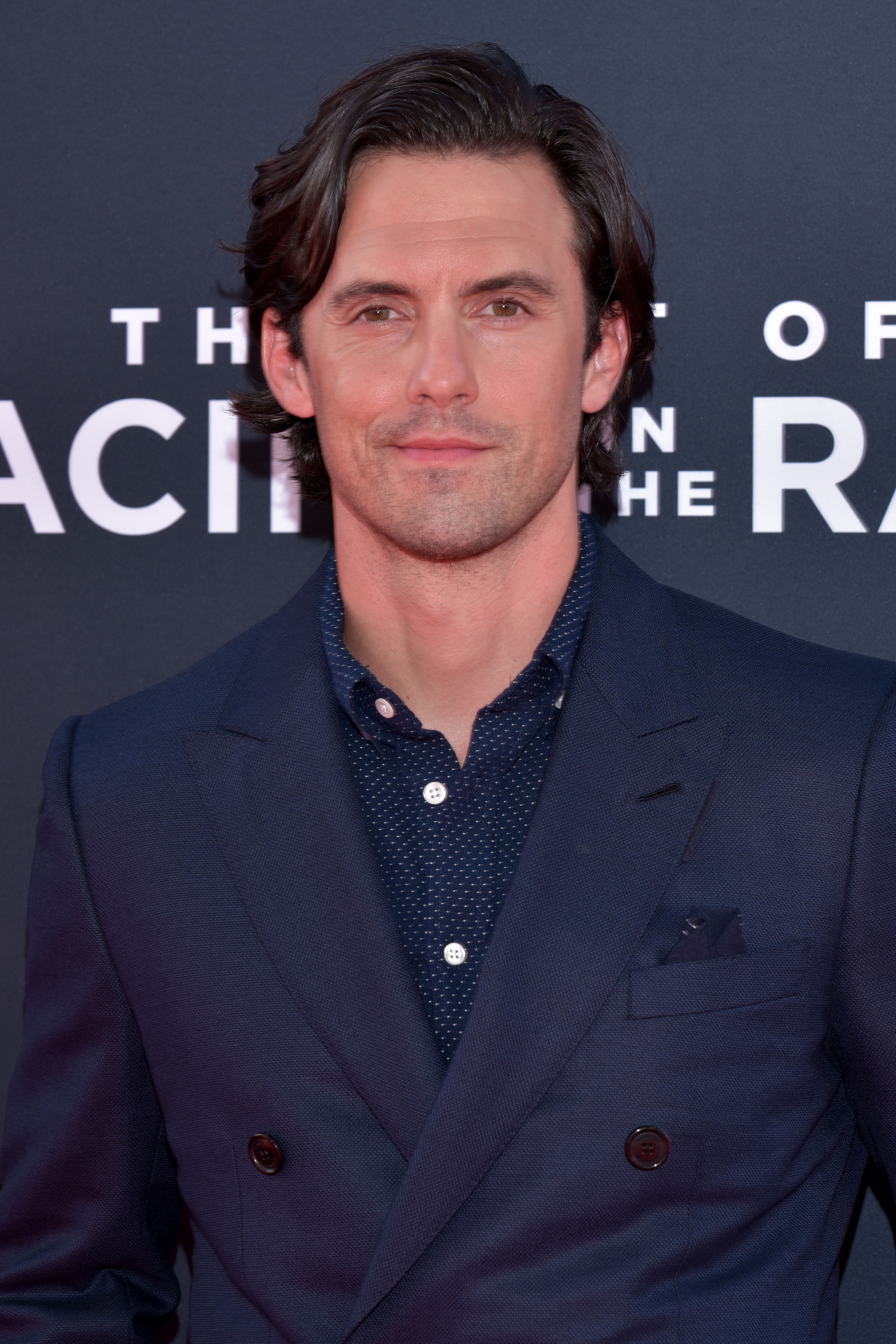
Milo Ventimiglia

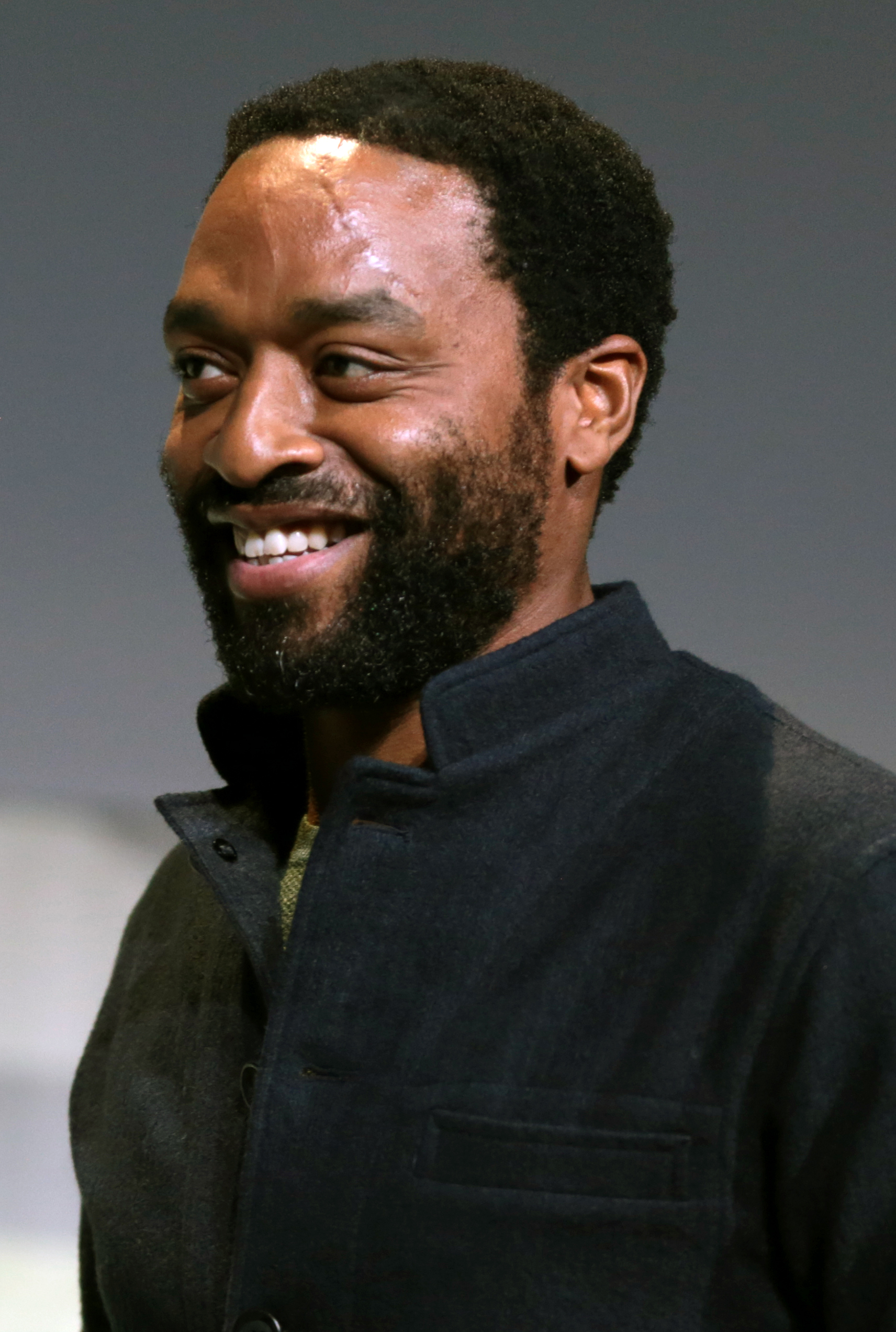
Chiwetel Ejiofor

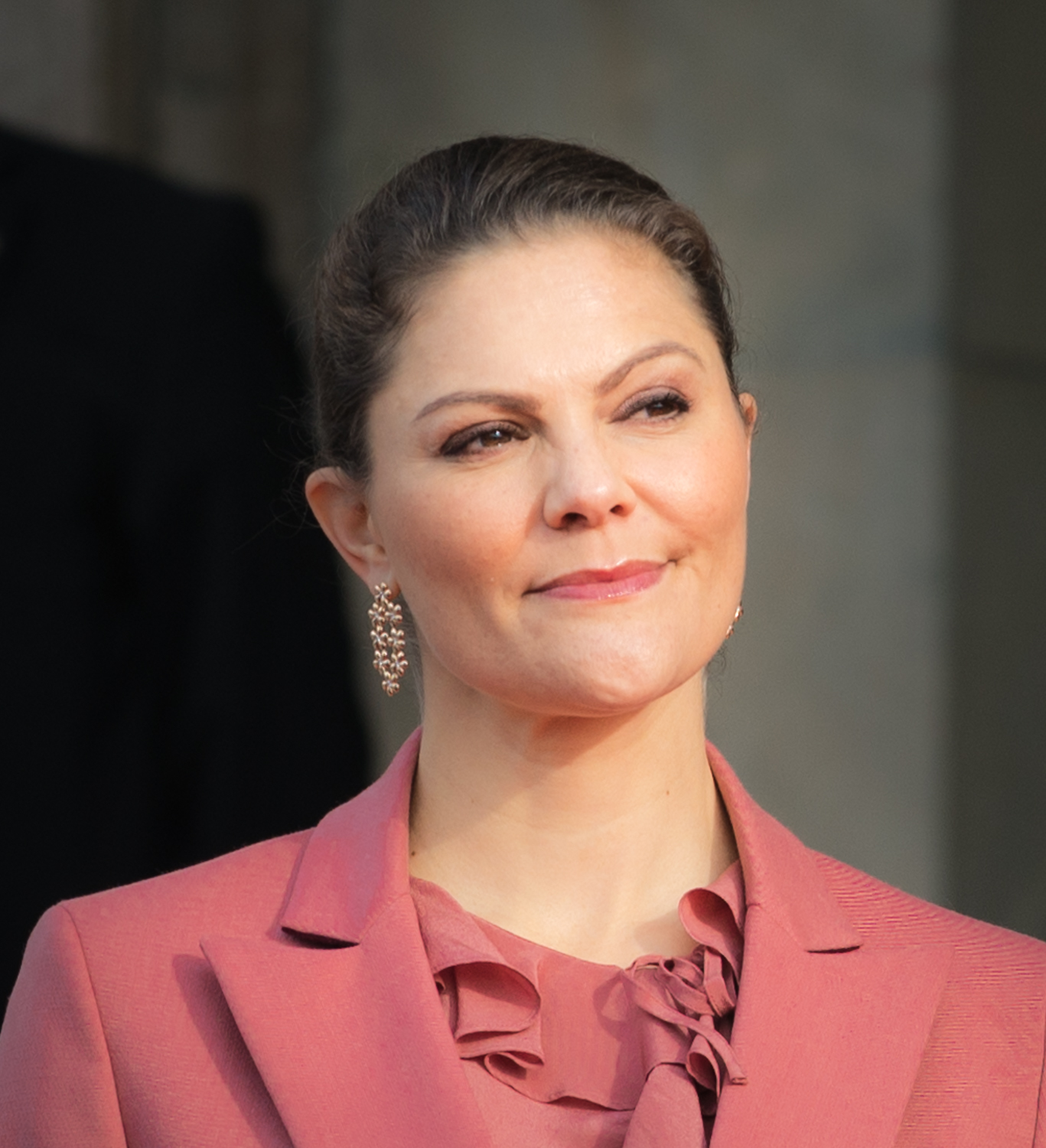
Victoria, Crown Princess of Sweden

- July 1 – Liv Tyler, American actress
- July 2 – Carl Froch, British boxer
- July 5 – Nicolas Kiefer, German tennis player
- July 6
  - Audrey Fleurot, French actress
  - Max Mirnyi, Belarusian tennis player
- July 8
  - Milo Ventimiglia, American actor
  - Wang Zhizhi, Chinese basketball player
- July 10 – Chiwetel Ejiofor, English actor
- July 11 – Finau Maka, Tongan rugby union footballer
- July 12
  - Steve Howey, American actor
  - Brock Lesnar, American professional wrestler and former mixed martial artist
- July 13 – Kari Wahlgren, American voice actress
- July 14 – Victoria, Crown Princess of Sweden
- July 15 – Lana Parrilla, American actress
- July 18 – Alexander Morozevich, Russian chess Grandmaster
- July 21
  - Paul Casey, English golfer
  - Allison Wagner, American swimmer
- July 24
  - Danny Dyer, English actor
  - Mehdi Mahdavikia, Iranian football player
- July 26 – Rebecca St. James, Australian-born Christian musician
- July 27 – Jonathan Rhys Meyers, Irish actor
- July 28 – Manu Ginóbili, Argentine basketball player
- July 30 – Jaime Pressly, American actress

=== August ===
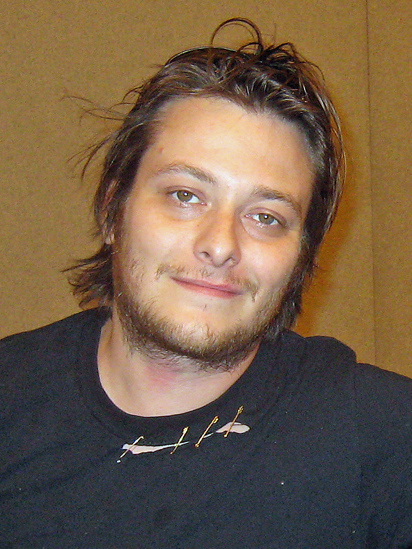
Edward Furlong

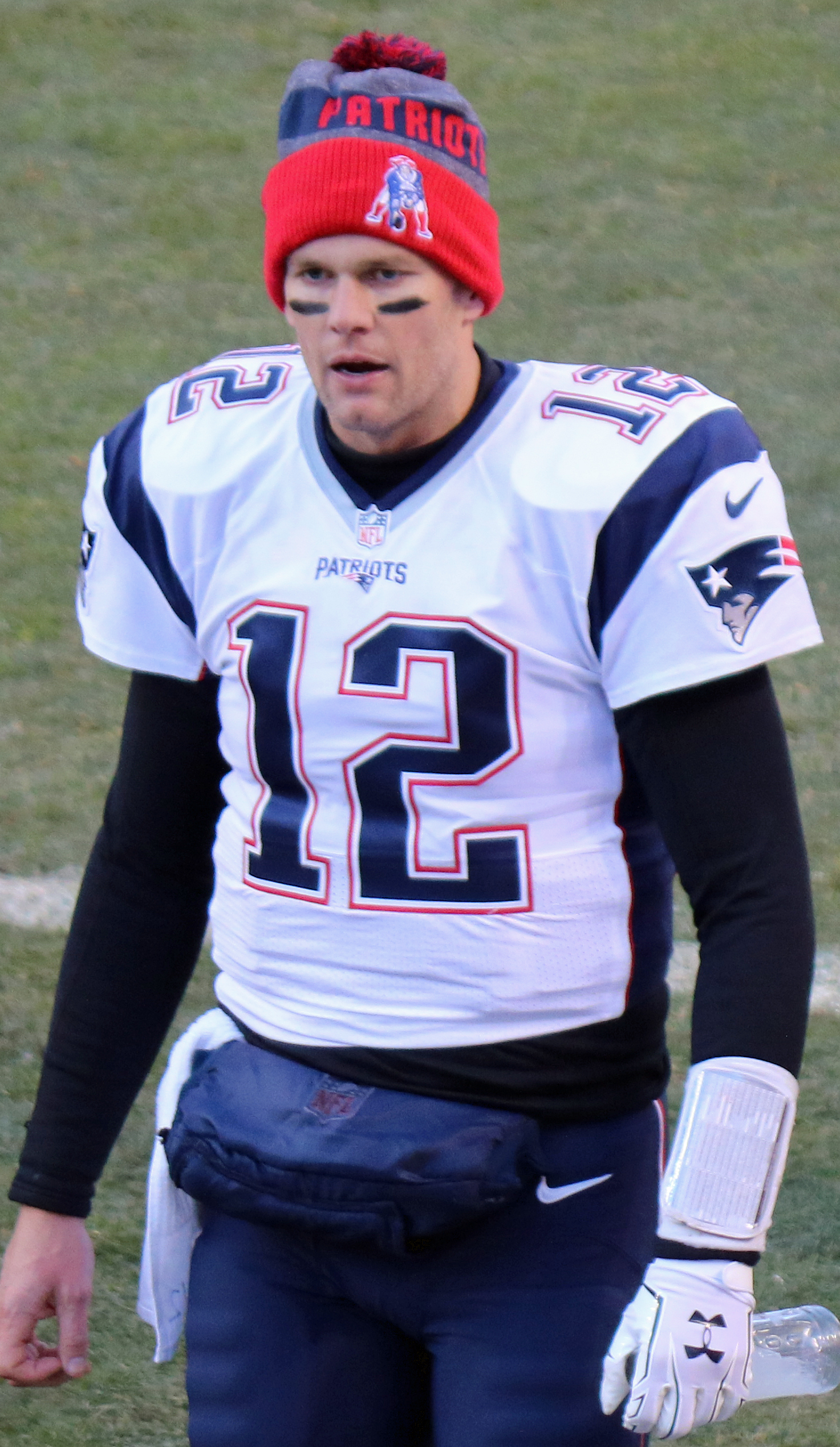
Tom Brady

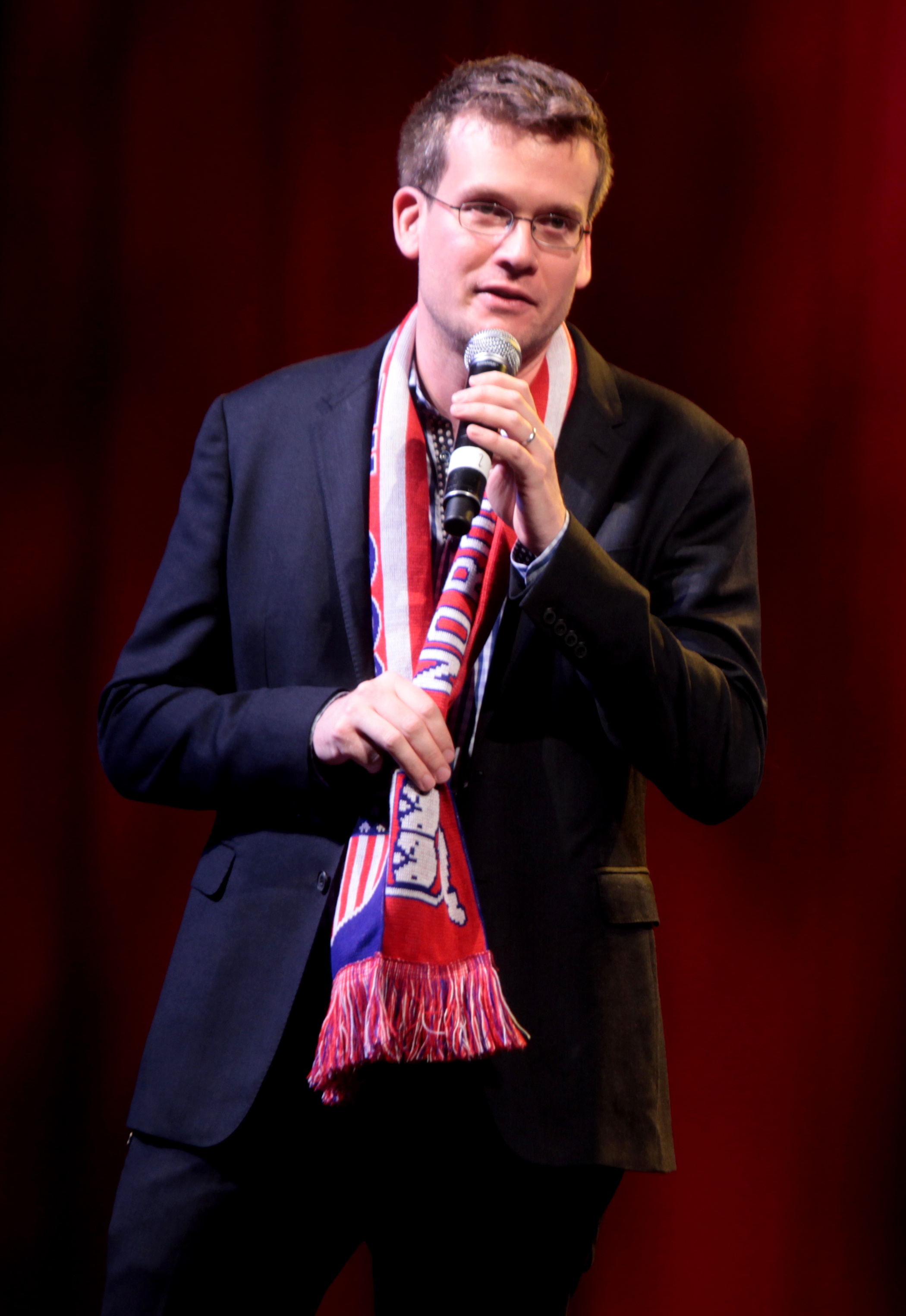
John Green

- August 2 – Edward Furlong, American actor
- August 3 – Tom Brady, American football player and entrepreneur
- August 8 – Marílson Gomes dos Santos, Brazilian long-distance runner
- August 9 – Chamique Holdsclaw, American basketball player
- August 12
  - Jesper Grønkjær, Danish footballer
  - Iva Majoli, Croatian tennis player
- August 13 – Michael Klim, Australian swimmer
- August 15
  - Martin Biron, Canadian hockey player
  - Igor Cassina, Italian gymnast
- August 16 – Tamer Hosny, Egyptian singer-songwriter and actor
- August 17
  - Tarja Turunen, Finnish operatic soprano
  - Thierry Henry, French footballer
  - William Gallas, French footballer
- August 18 – Lukáš Bauer, Czech cross-country skier
- August 20
  - Felipe Contepomi, Argentine rugby player
  - Manuel Contepomi, Argentine rugby player
  - Henning Stensrud, Norwegian ski jumper
- August 24
  - Denílson, Brazilian footballer
  - Jürgen Macho, Austrian footballer
  - John Green, American author, vlogger, and editor
  - Robert Enke, German footballer (d. 2009)
- August 27 – Deco, Brazilian born-Portuguese footballer
- August 30
  - Jens Ludwig, German guitarist
  - Félix Sánchez, American-Dominican athlete
- August 31
  - Jeff Hardy, American professional wrestler
  - Ian Harte, Irish footballer

=== September ===
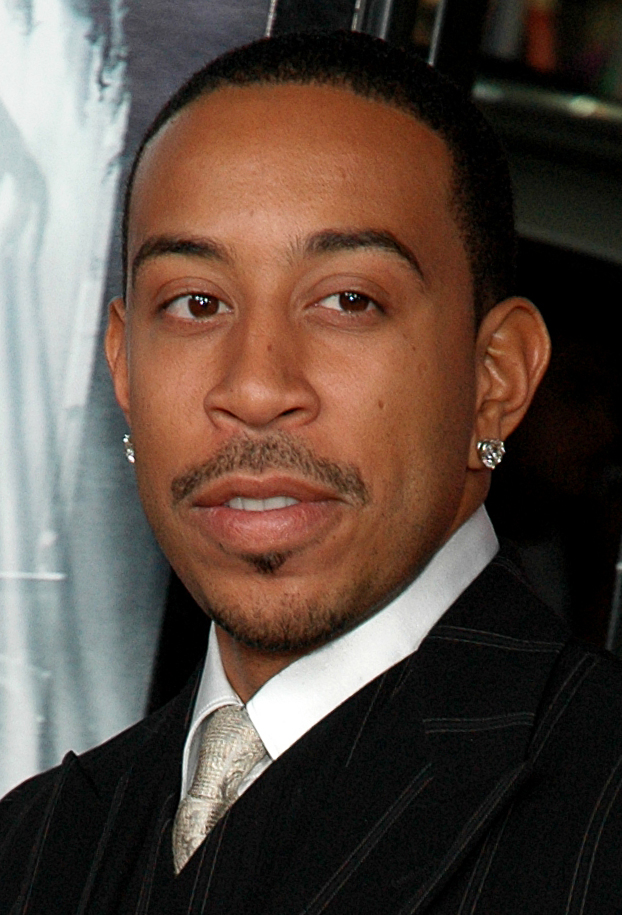
Ludacris

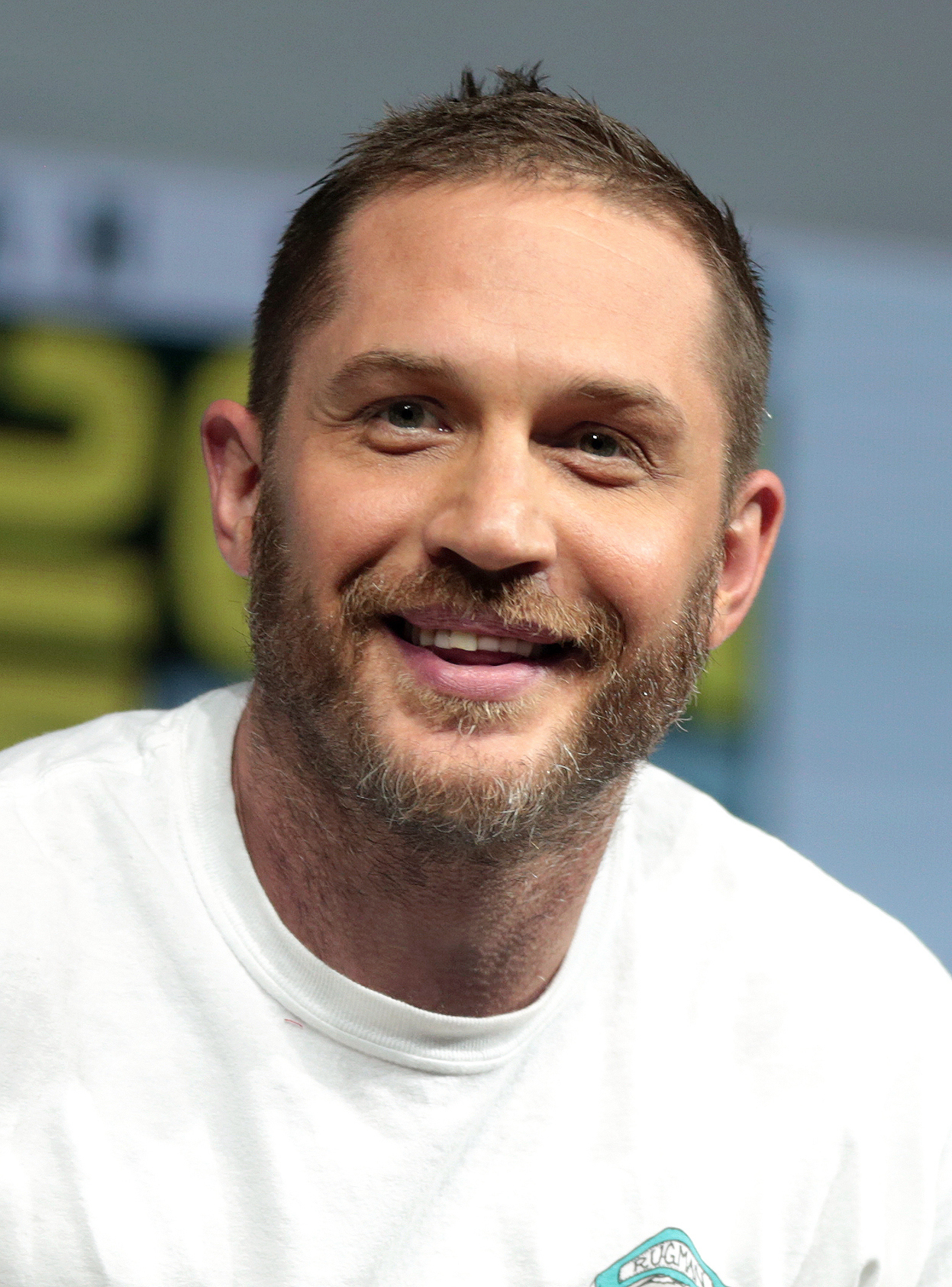
Tom Hardy

- September 1 – David Albelda, Spanish footballer
- September 2
  - Frédéric Kanouté, Malian soccer player
  - Elitsa Todorova, Bulgarian singer-songwriter
- September 4 – Lucie Silvas, English singer
- September 5 – Sin Cara, Mexican-American professional wrestler
- September 6 – Katalin Novák, Hungarian politician
- September 9 – Soulja Slim, American rapper (d. 2003)
- September 11 – Ludacris, American rapper and actor
- September 12
  - 2 Chainz, American rapper
  - Idan Raichel, Israeli singer-songwriter
- September 13 – Fiona Apple, American singer
- September 15
  - Chimamanda Ngozi Adichie, Nigerian author
  - Tom Hardy, English actor
  - Jason Terry, American basketball player
- September 18 – Kieran West, British Olympic oarsman
- September 20 – Namie Amuro, Japanese singer
- September 23 – Suzanne Tamim, Lebanese singer, actress, and murder victim (d. 2008)
- September 25 – Joel David Moore, American actor
- September 27 – Andrus Värnik, Estonian javelin thrower
- September 28 – Pak Se-ri, South Korean golfer
- September 30
  - Roy Carroll, Irish footballer
  - Sun Jihai, Chinese footballer

=== October ===
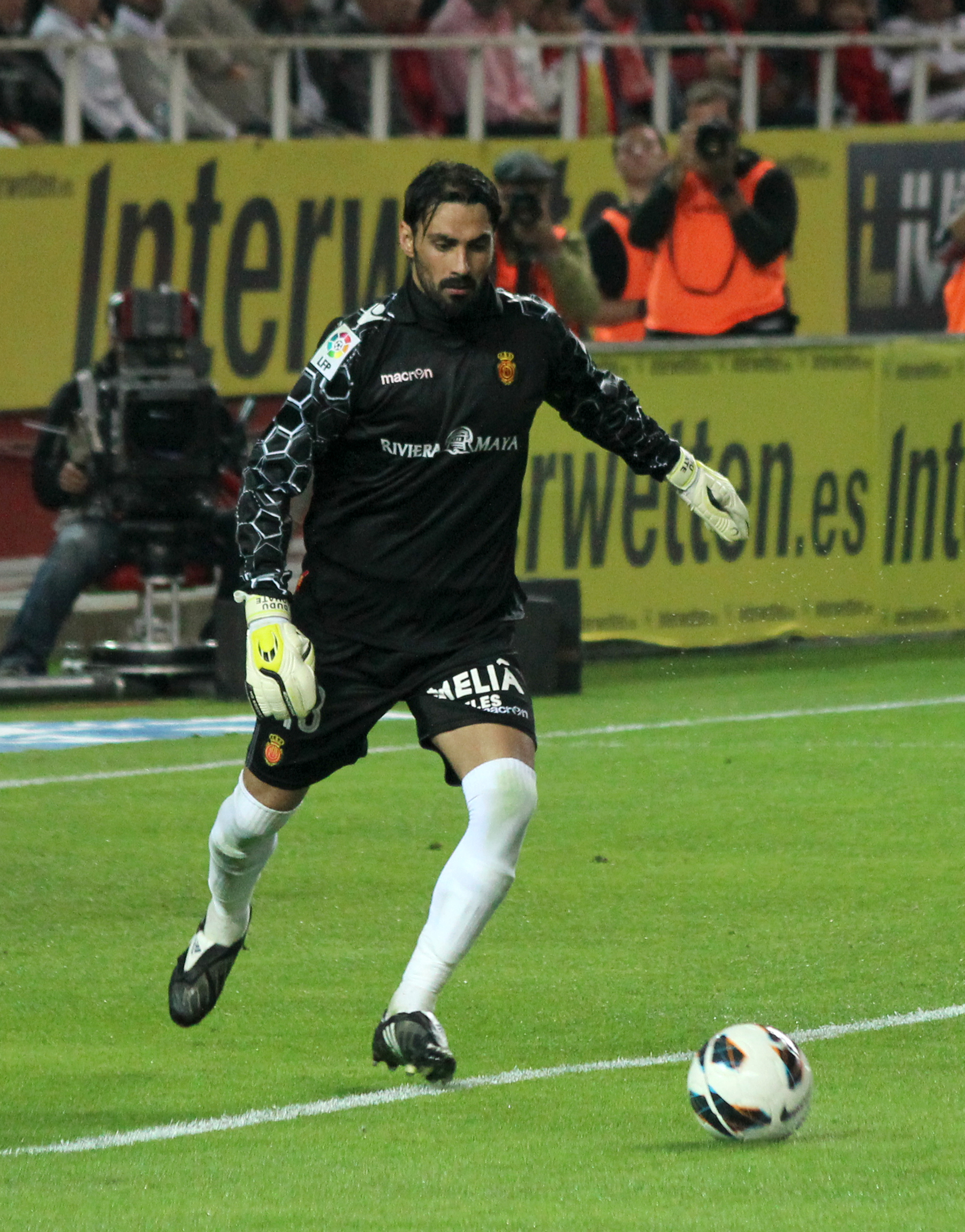
Dudu Aouate

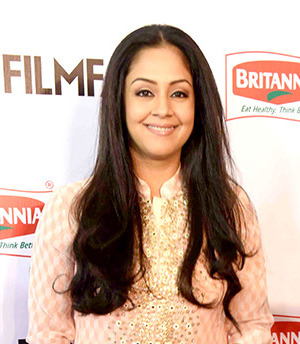
Jyothika

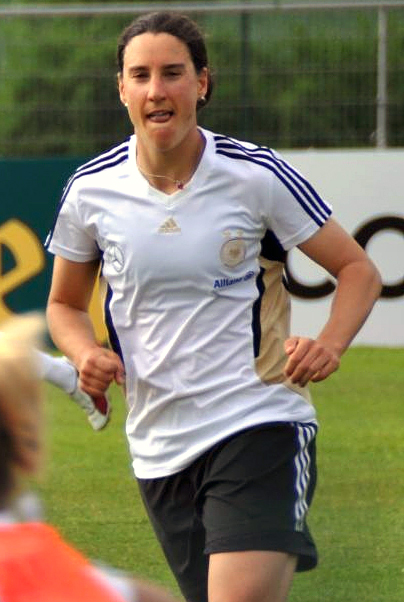
Birgit Prinz

- October 1 - Claudia Palacios, Colombian journalist and newsreader
- October 2 – Didier Défago, Swiss Olympic alpine skier
- October 3 – Antonio Di Natale, Italian football player and coach
- October 4
  - Najat Vallaud-Belkacem, French politician
  - Bowie Jane, Australian DJ, singer, producer, lawyer and contestant on Big Brother Season 25
- October 6 – Daniel Brière, Canadian ice hockey player and executive
- October 8 – Anne-Caroline Chausson, French mountain bicycle racer
- October 10 – Brandon Vera, Filipino-American retired mixed martial artist and former ONE Heavyweight World Champion
- October 11 - Matt Bomer, American film, stage, and television actor
- October 12 – Bode Miller, American skier
- October 13
  - Paul Pierce, American basketball player
  - Kiele Sanchez, American actress
- October 14
  - Kelly Schumacher, American basketball and volleyball player
  - Oleg Velyky, Ukrainian and German handball player World champion 2007 (d. 2010)
- October 15 – David Trezeguet, French footballer
- October 16 – John Mayer, American musician and record producer
- October 17
  - Dudu Aouate, Israeli footballer
  - André Villas-Boas, Portuguese football manager
- October 18
  - Ryan Nelsen, New Zealand footballer
  - Peter Sohn, American animator, voice actor, storyboard artist, and film director
  - Paul Stalteri, Canadian soccer player
- October 19 – Raúl Tamudo, Spanish footballer
- October 25 – Birgit Prinz, German footballer
- October 26 – Louis Crayton, Swiss/Liberian footballer
- October 27 – Kumar Sangakkara, Sri Lankan cricketer
- October 28 – Jonas Rasmussen, Danish badminton player
- October 29 – Brendan Fehr, Canadian actor

=== November ===
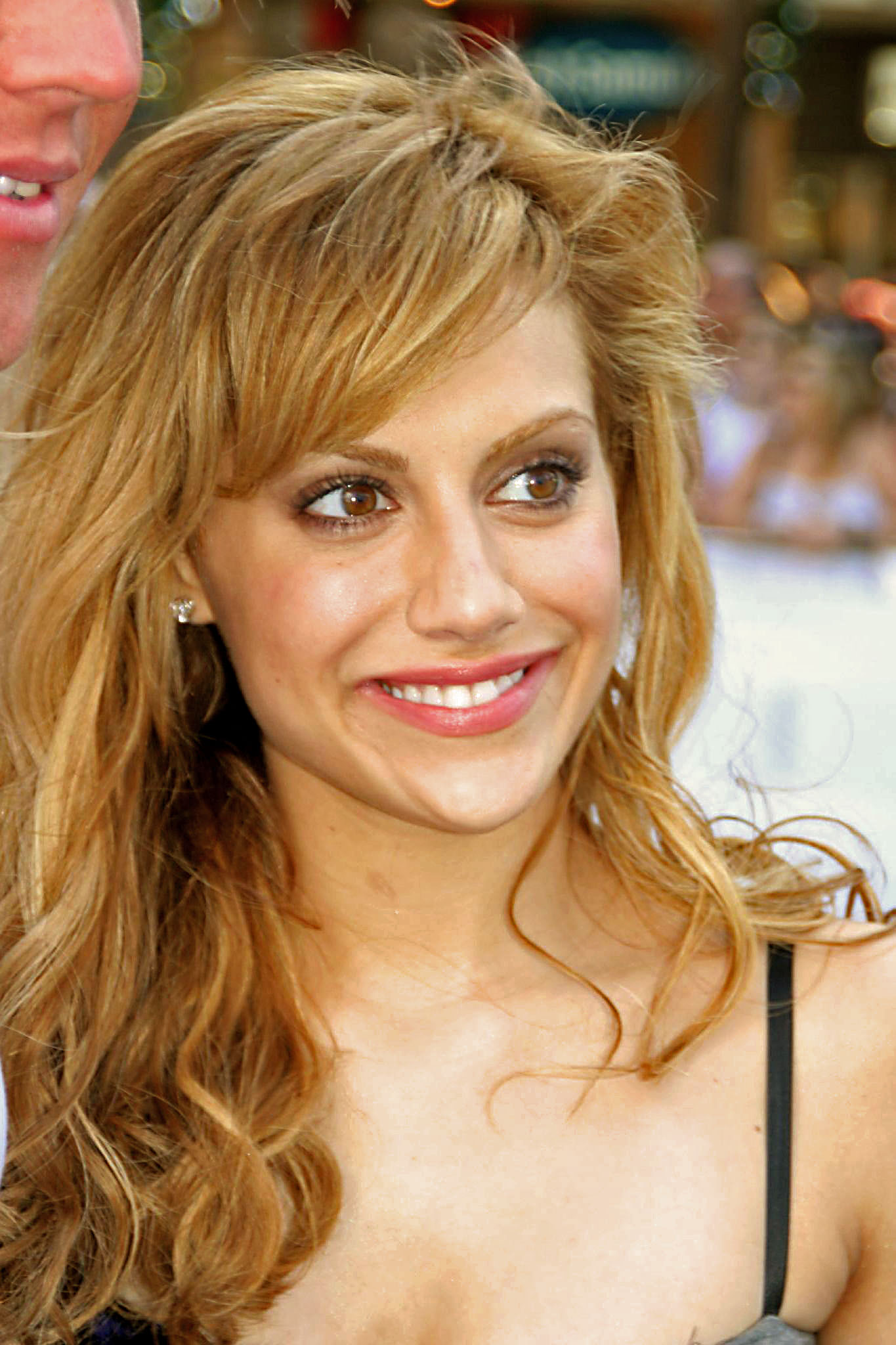
Brittany Murphy

- November 10 – Brittany Murphy, American actress and singer (d. 2009)
- November 11
  - Maniche, Portuguese footballer
  - Scoot McNairy, American actor
- November 13 – Huang Xiaoming, Chinese actor and singer
- November 16
  - Oksana Baiul, Ukrainian figure skater
  - Maggie Gyllenhaal, American actress
- November 17 – Ryk Neethling, South African swimmer
- November 18 – Trent Barrett, Australian rugby league player
- November 19
  - Mette Frederiksen, Danish politician
  - Kerri Strug, American gymnast
- November 21 – Tobias Sammet, German singer and songwriter
- November 24 – Colin Hanks, American actor
- November 28 – Fabio Grosso, Italian football player and coach
- November 30 – Nelsan Ellis, African-American film and television actor and playwright (d. 2017)

=== December ===
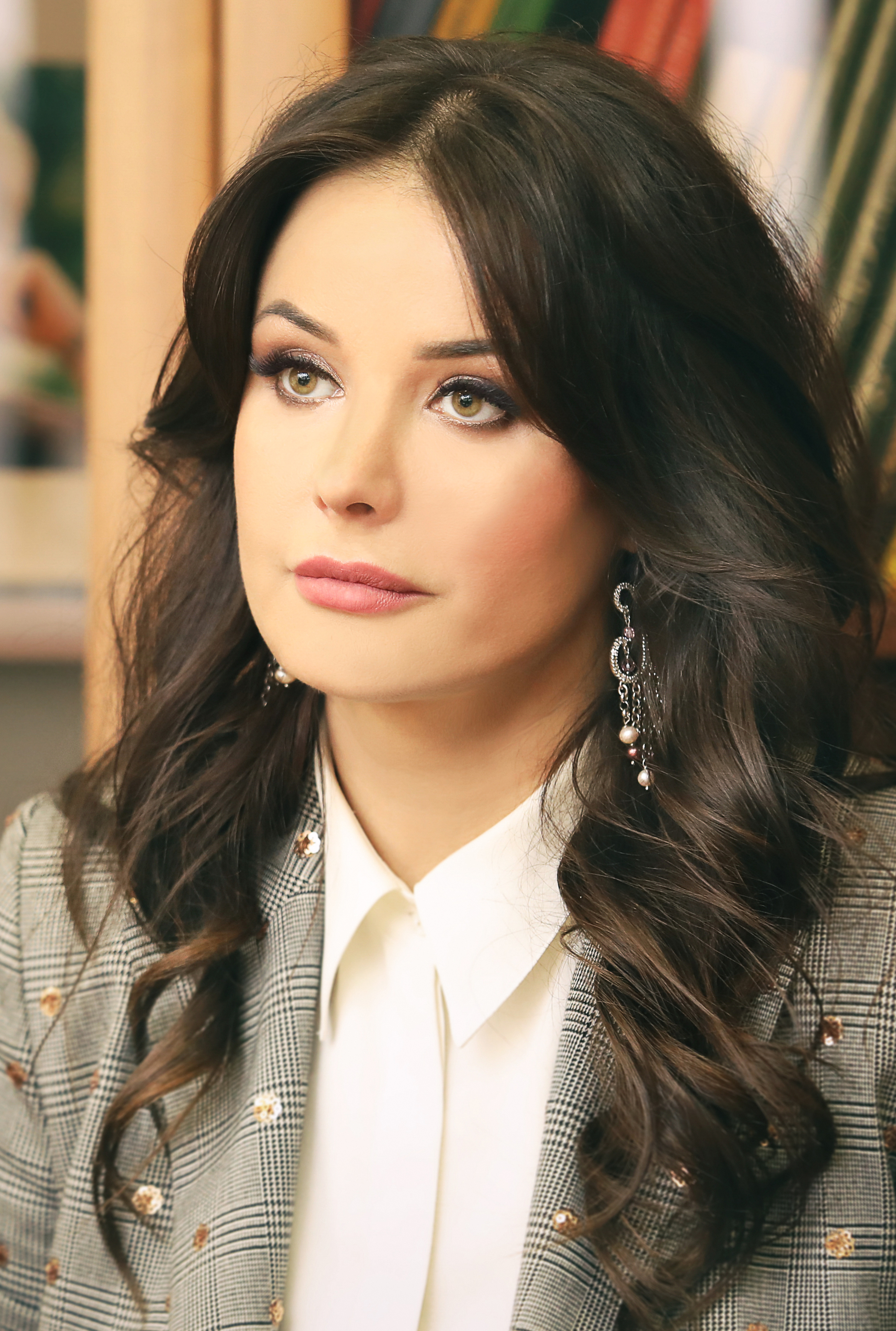
Oxana Fedorova

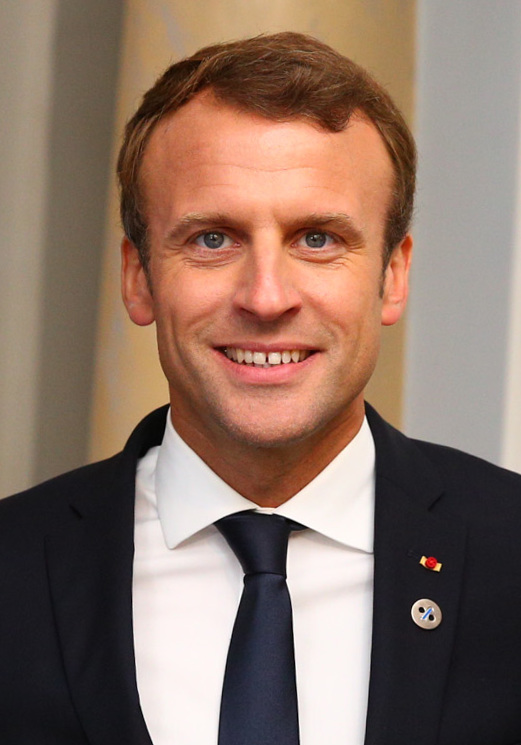
Emmanuel Macron

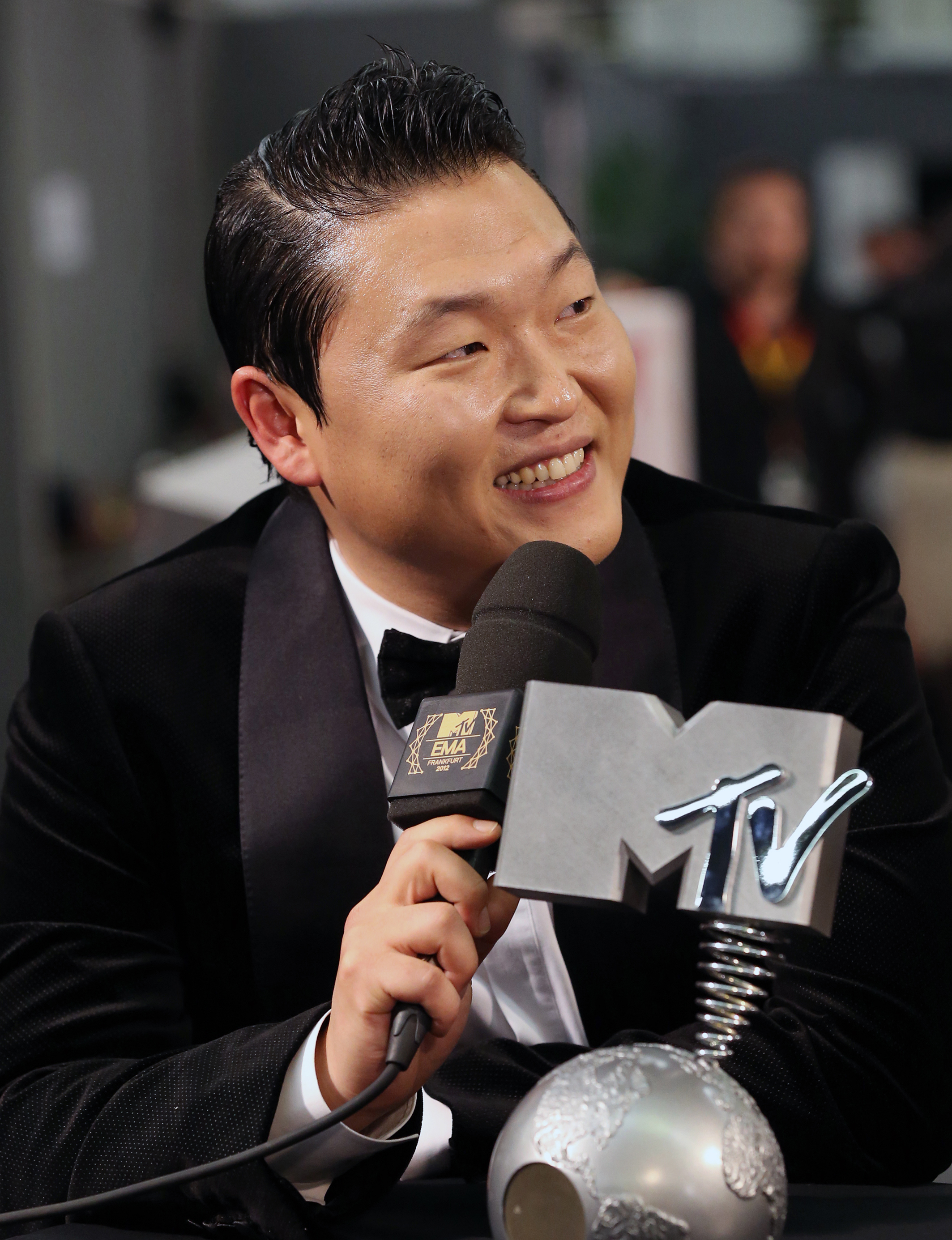
Psy

- December 1 – Brad Delson, American musician (Linkin Park)
- December 2 – Nancy Mace, American politician
- December 6 – Andrew Flintoff, English cricketer
- December 7 – Luke Donald, English golfer
- December 8
  - Elsa Benítez, Mexican model and television host
  - Sébastien Chabal, French rugby union player
  - Matthias Schoenaerts, Belgian actor and producer
- December 10 – Andrea Henkel, German professional biathlete
- December 12 – Adam Saitiev, Chechen wrestler, Olympic gold medalist
- December 16
  - Anu Nieminen, Finnish badminton player
  - René Redzepi, Danish chef
- December 17 – Oxana Fedorova, Russian model
- December 20 – Sonja Aldén, Swedish pop singer
- December 21
  - Gregor Horvatič, Slovenian politician
  - Emmanuel Macron, 25th president of France
- December 23 – Jari Mäenpää, Finnish musician
- December 24 – Domingo Vega, also known as Américo, Chilean singer
- December 25 – Uhm Ji-won, South Korean actress
- December 30
  - Laila Ali, American boxer
  - Kenyon Martin, American basketball player
- December 31
  - Psy, South Korean singer, songwriter, rapper, dancer and record producer
  - Donald Trump Jr., American businessman and son of former U.S. president Donald Trump

== Nobel Prizes ==

- Physics – Philip Warren Anderson, Sir Nevill Francis Mott, John Hasbrouck Van Vleck
- Chemistry – Ilya Prigogine
- Physiology or Medicine – Roger Guillemin, Andrew Schally, Rosalyn Yalow
- Literature – Vicente Aleixandre
- Peace – Amnesty International
- Economics – Bertil Ohlin, James Meade
