= Olsi =

Olsi is an Albanian male given name. Notable people with this name include:

- Olsi Baze (born 1977), Albanian politician
- Olsi Bylyku (born 1998), Albanian comedian
- Olsi Gocaj, Albanian football player
- Olsi Krasniqi (born 1992), Albanian rugby league player
- Olsi Rama, Albanian politician
- Olsi Teqja (born 1988), Albanian football player

== See also ==
- Olší (Brno-Country District), Czech Republic
- Olší (Jihlava District), Czech Republic
