= Olší =

Olší may refer to places in the Czech Republic:

- Olší (Brno-Country District), a municipality and village in the South Moravian Region
- Olší (Jihlava District), a municipality and village in the Vysočina Region
- Olší, a village and part of Opařany in the South Bohemian Region
- Olší nad Oslavou, a village and part of Velké Meziříčí in the Vysočina Region
