= William Heeser =

German-American publisher and banker

William Heeser (August 28, 1822, in Koblenz, Germany – April 9, 1906) was a German-American newspaper publisher and banker in Mendocino County, California.

Heeser emigrated from Germany to Baltimore with his brother, Augustus H. Heeser, following the death of his father, and then moved to Providence, Kentucky, where he opened a general store in 1844. He arrived in the town of Mendocino in the 1850s, and purchased in 1858 from William H. Kelly a farm consisting of most of the land west of Lansing Street in Mendocino. He soon became a justice of the peace and notary public; he was a county supervisor from 1864 to 1867 and from 1877 to 1880. He operated a general store in Mendocino, and chose the names for many of Mendocino's streets. As a United States deputy surveyor, Heeser constructed Little Lake road (a wagon road from Mendocino to Willits), and another road from Mendocino to Ukiah. In 1870 and 1871 he founded the Bank of Mendocino and the Mendocino Discount Bank. Heeser founded the Mendocino Beacon in Mendocino, California, with W. H. Meacham in 1877 and the Fort Bragg Advocate in Fort Bragg, California, in 1889; he also founded newspapers in the Mendocino County communities of Kibesillah, Rockport, and Westport. In 1892, he purchased the Point Arena Record, which had been founded in 1888 by H. B. Cartnell.

Heeser became a Freemason in 1850, and joined the California lodge of the Masons around 1852. He was one of the founders, initially warden and later master of the Mendocino lodge, #179, which began in 1865 and met above Heeser's general store until its own building, the Mendocino Masonic Hall, was completed in 1872. He married Laura A. Nelson on December 18, 1865; they had one son, Augustus A. Heeser, who continued his father's businesses.

Heeser Drive in Mendocino Headlands State Park is named after William's son, August Heeser, who inherited the newspaper publishing business and who donated some of the headlands to form the park in 1957.
