= The Mendocino Beacon =

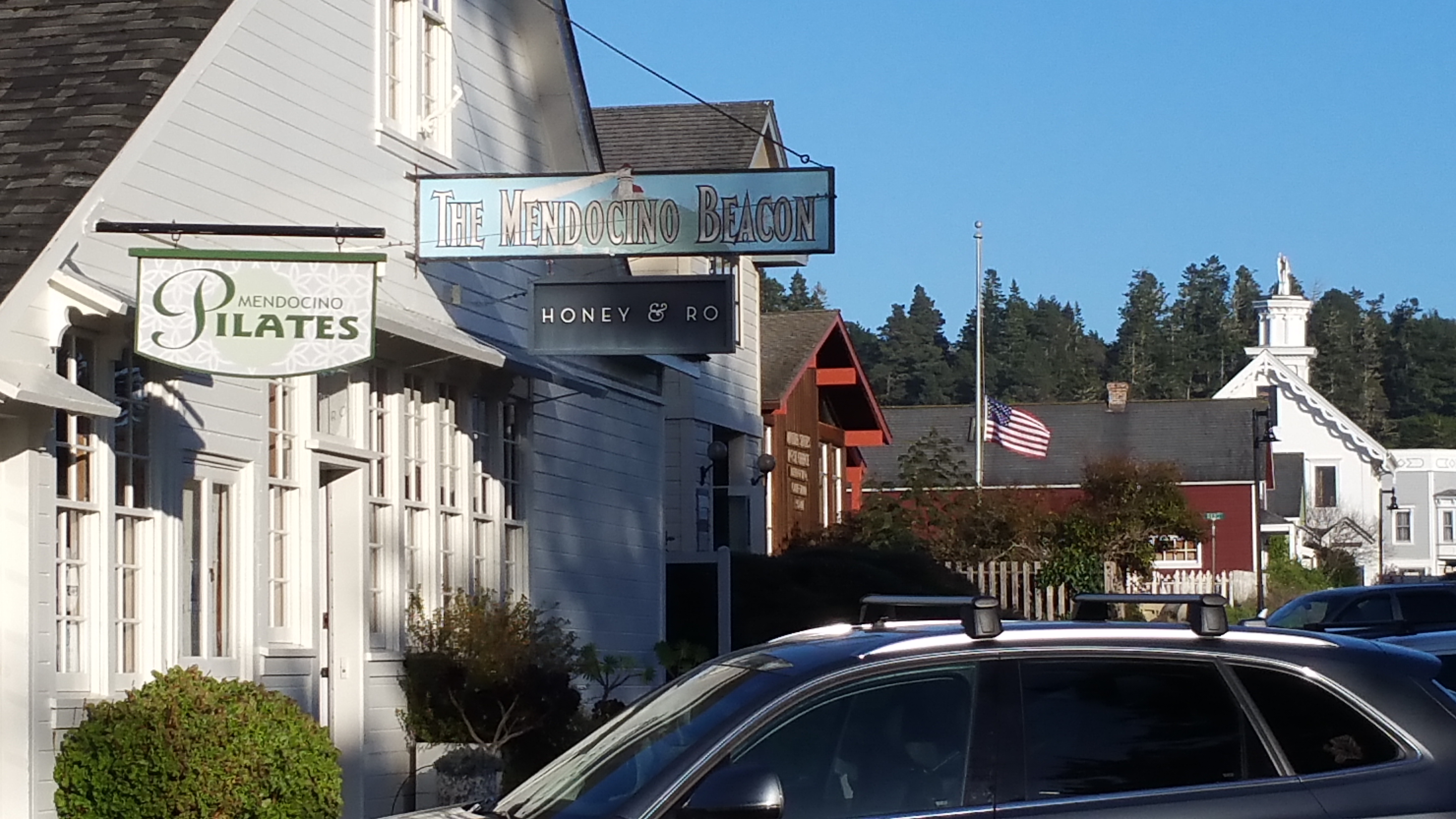
- The Mendocino Beacon sign still hangs on the newspaper's original home at 45062 Ukiah St., Mendocino
- Type: Weekly newspaper
- Format: Broadsheet
- Owner(s): MediaNews Group, Digital First Media
- Founder(s): W. H. Meacham; William Heeser
- Publisher: K.C. Meadows
- Founded: October 1877
- Language: English
- Headquarters: Fort Bragg, Mendocino County, California
- Circulation: 2,400
- OCLC number: 32989958
- Website: mendocinobeacon.com

The Mendocino Beacon is a weekly newspaper for the community of Mendocino, California, owned by MediaNews Group.

From 1975 to 1977 it was published under an alternative name, the Mendocino Coast Beacon.

== History ==
The Mendocino Beacon was founded on October 6, 1877 by W. H. Meacham and William Heeser, an immigrant from Germany who also founded the Fort Bragg Advocate-News and three other local newspapers in Kibesillah, Rockport, and Westport. It succeeded the Star, a local newspaper that had been founded previously by M. J. C. Galvin.

In an 1878 catalog of North American newspapers the Beacon was advertised as "an independent and vigorous weekly journal, published at a point of rising importance as a place of shipping and trade."

Members of the Hesser family publisher the paper for 98 years until selling it in 1975 to the Mendocino Publishing Co., which owned the Ukiah Daily Journal. A year later the company purchased the Fort Bragg Advocate-News.

In 1984, Donrey Media Group acquired the Beacon and two other papers. On Jan. 13, 1999, Donrey merged 10 of its California newspapers, including the Beacon, into Garden State Newspapers, which was owned by MediaNews Group. Donrey owned a third of the joint venture while MediaNews owned the majority stake. In August 2000, the newspaper offices moved from Mendocino to Fort Bragg, ten miles north of Mendocino, and consolidated with the offices of the Fort Bragg Advocate-News.

== Recognition ==
In the 2009 California Newspaper Publishers Association's "Better Newspaper Contest", the Mendocino Beacon won first place in its circulation category for a business/financial story, for a story on Heritage House by Frank Hartzell. It has also won similar awards in previous years.
