= Father Time =

Personification of time passing

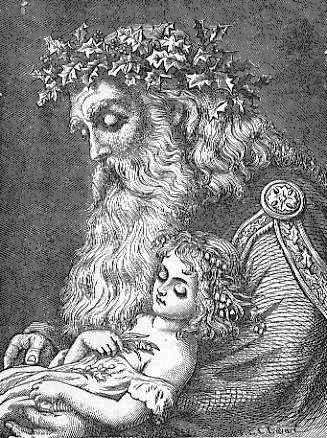
A 19th-century Father Time with Baby New Year

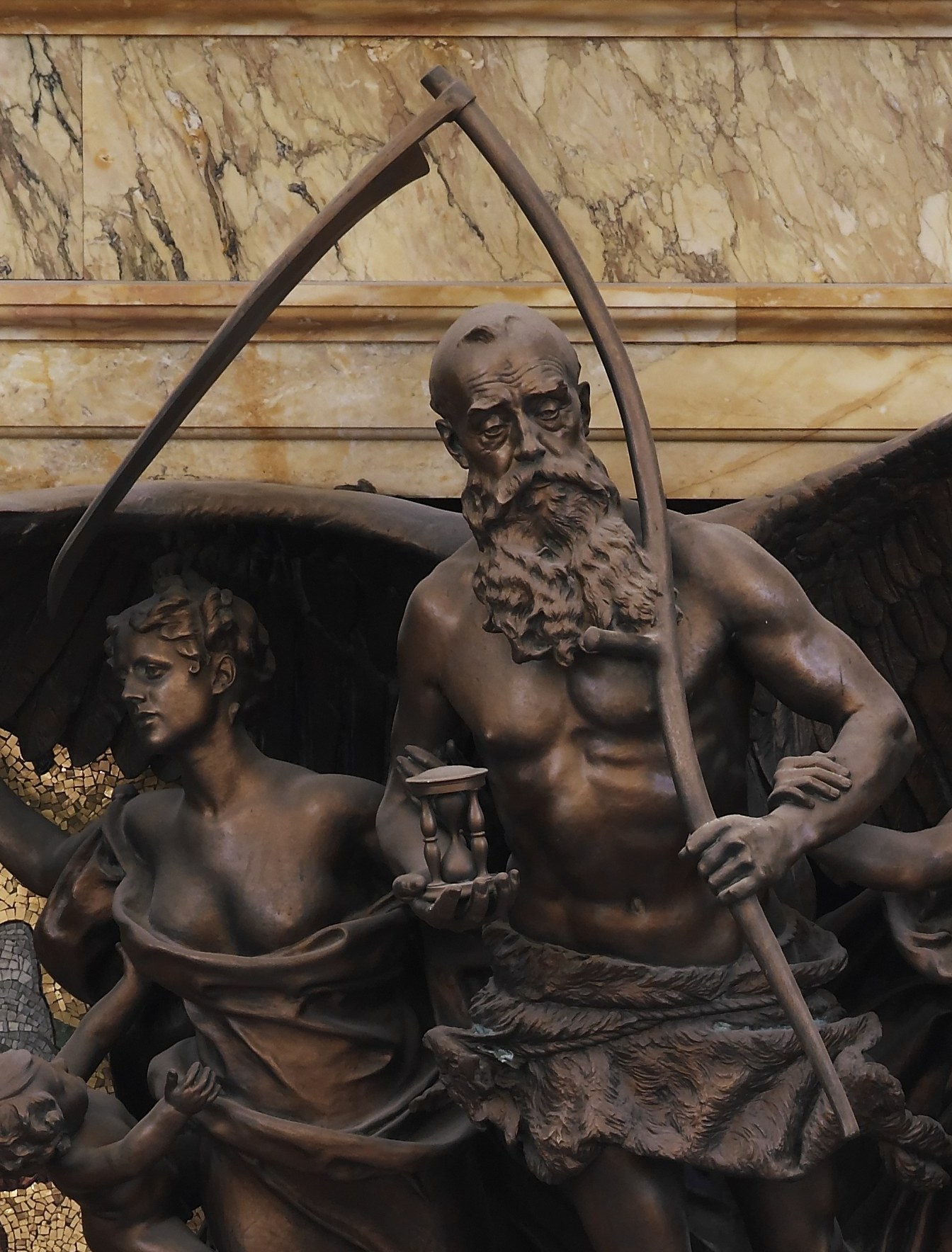
Detail of Father Time in the Rotunda Clock in the Thomas Jefferson Building, Washington, D.C. (1896)

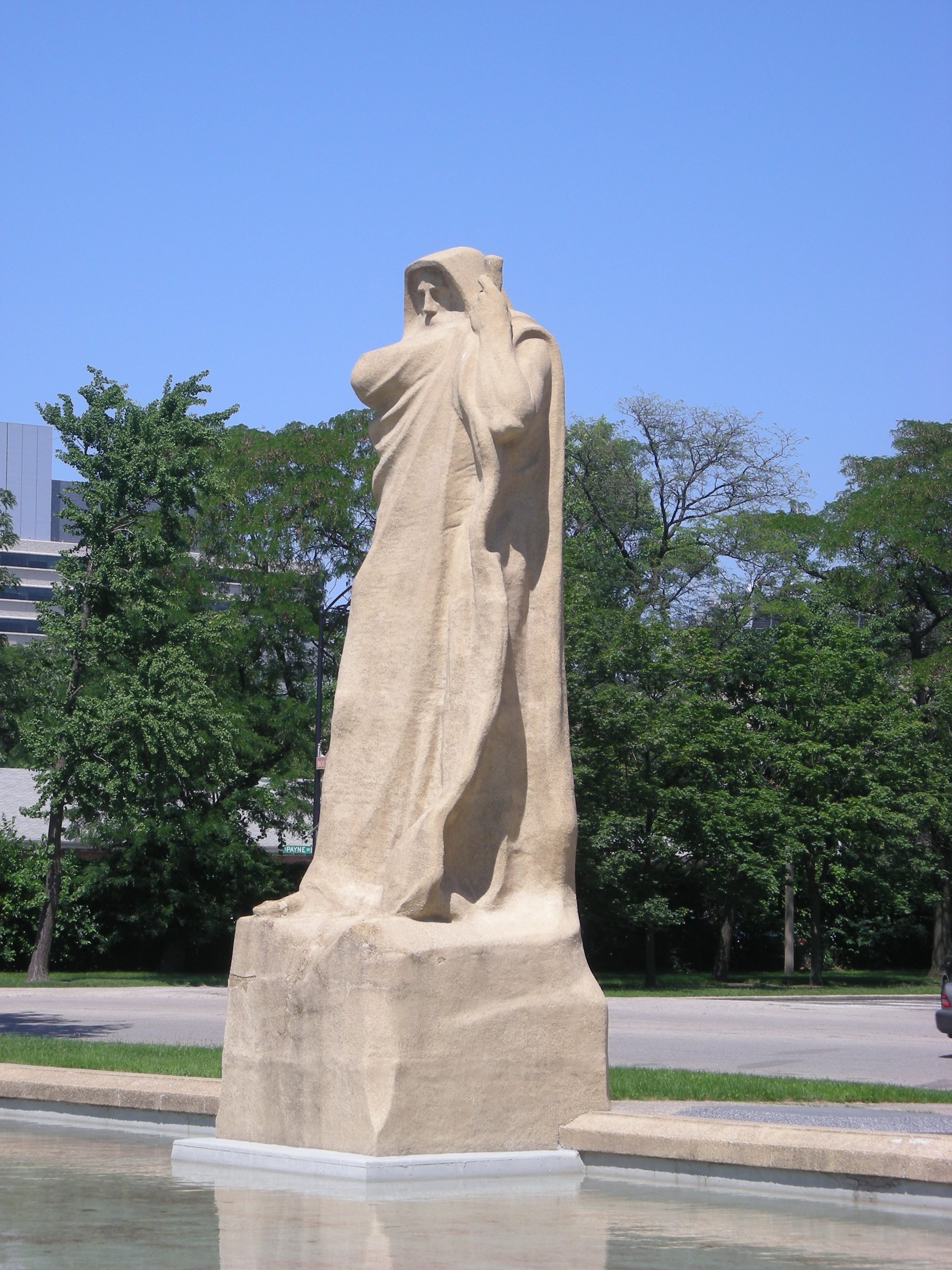
Father Time in Fountain of Time

Father Time is a personification of time, in particular the progression of history and the approach of death. In recent centuries, he is usually depicted as an elderly bearded man, sometimes with wings, dressed in a robe and carrying a scythe and an hourglass or other timekeeping device.

As an image, the origins of "Father Time" are varied. The ancient Greeks themselves began to associate Chronos with the god Cronus, who had the attribute of a harvester's sickle. The Romans equated Cronus with Saturn, who also had a sickle, and was treated as an old man, often with a crutch. The wings and hourglass were early Renaissance additions and he eventually became a companion of the Grim Reaper, personification of Death, often taking his scythe. He may have as an attribute a snake with its tail in its mouth, an ancient Egyptian symbol of eternity.

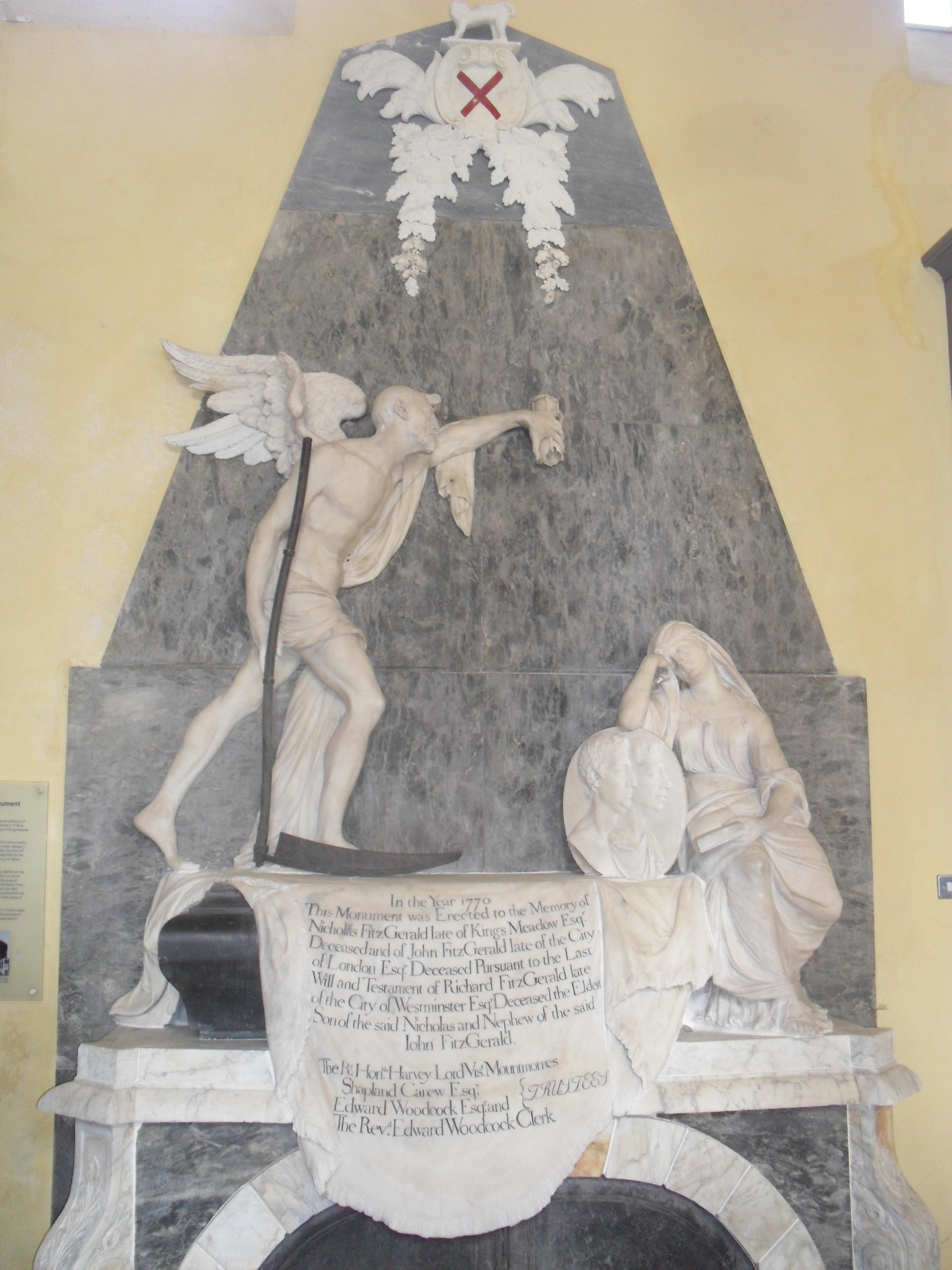
Father Time on an Irish memorial stone, displaying an empty hourglass to a mourning widow

== New Year ==
Around New Year's Eve, the media (in particular editorial cartoons) use the convenient trope of Father Time as the personification of the previous year (or "the Old Year") who typically "hands over" the duties of time to the equally allegorical Baby New Year (or "the New Year") or who otherwise characterizes the preceding year. In these depictions, Father Time is usually depicted wearing a sash with the old year's date on it.

Time (in his allegorical form) is often depicted revealing or unveiling the allegorical Truth, sometimes at the expense of a personification of Falsehood, Fraud, or Envy. This theme is related to the idea of veritas filia temporis (Truth the daughter of time).

== In the arts ==
Father Time is an established symbol in numerous cultures and appears in a variety of art and media. In some cases, they appear specifically as Father Time while in other cases they may have another name (such as Saturn), but the characters demonstrate the attributes which Father Time has acquired over the centuries.

=== Art ===
==== Visual art ====
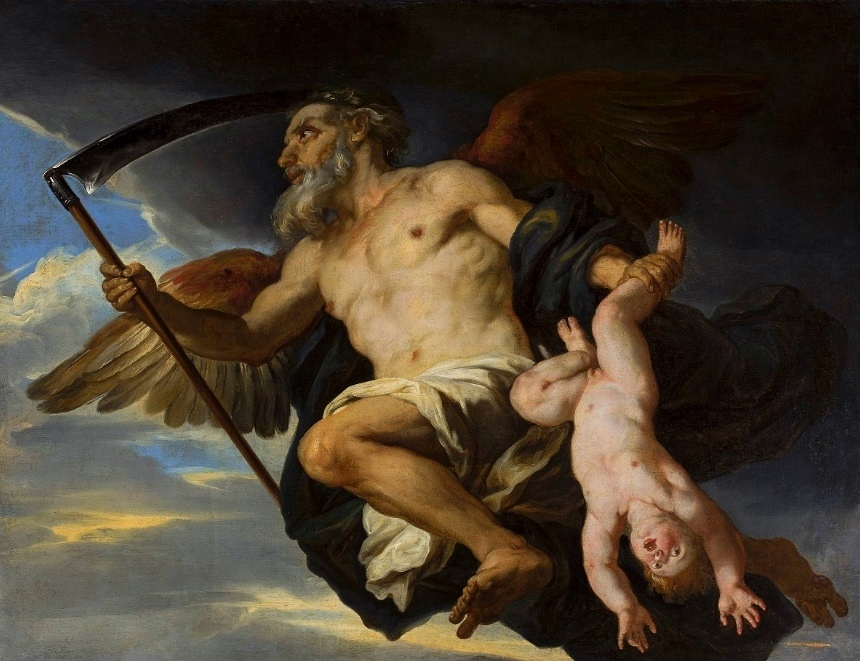
Chronos and his child by Giovanni Francesco Romanelli, National Museum in Warsaw, is a 17th-century depiction of Titan Cronus as "Father Time" wielding the harvesting scythe

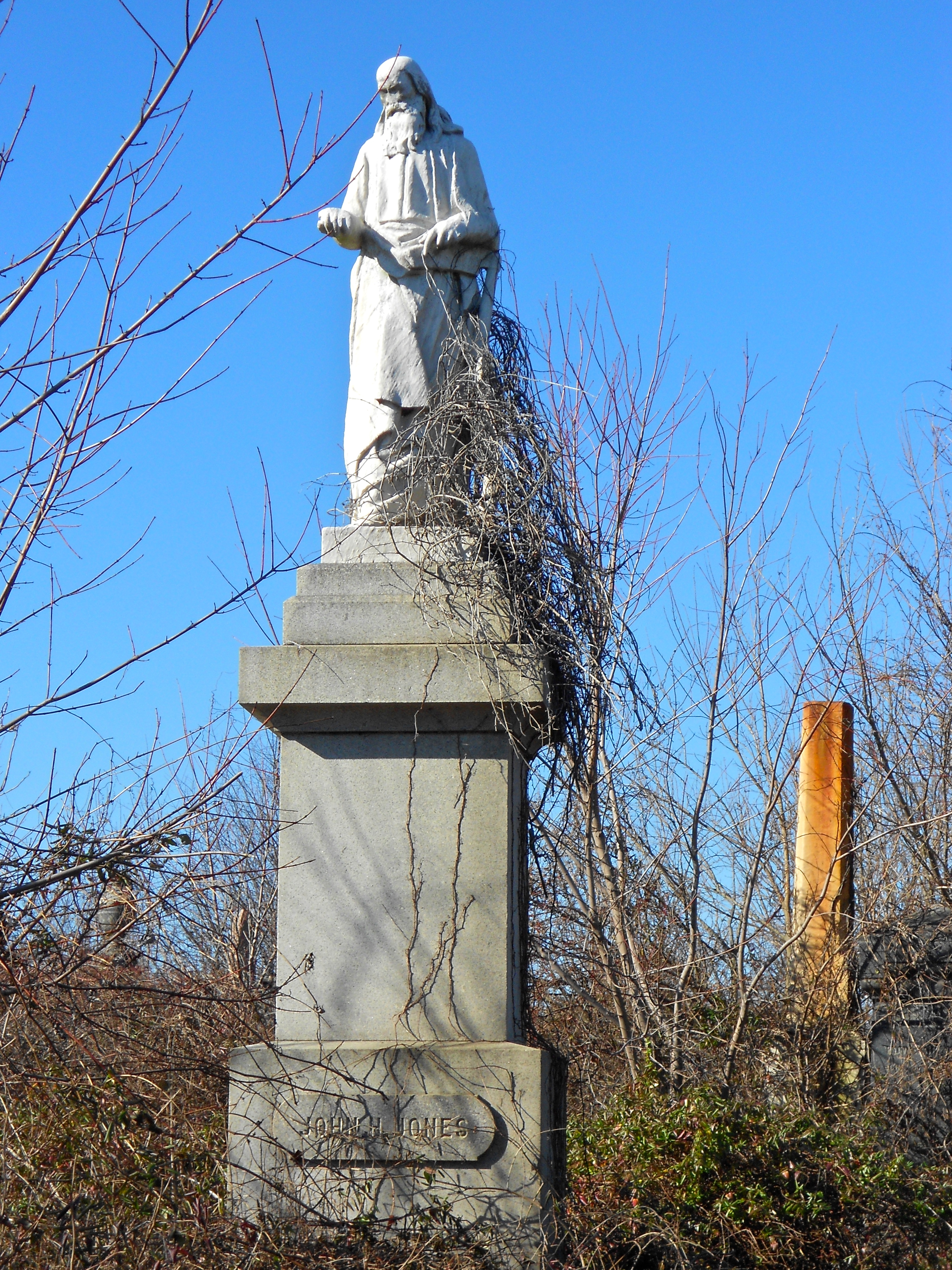
Father Time statue atop a grave at Mount Moriah Cemetery

- Venus, Cupid, Folly, and Time, a c.1545 painting by Agnolo Bronzino, National Gallery, London.
- An Allegory of Truth and Time, a 1584–85 painting by Annibale Carracci, Royal Collection Trust.
- An Allegory of Truth, a 1596 painting by Gillis Coignet the Elder, showing Time presenting Truth.
- Time Rescuing Truth from Envy (Veritas Filia Temporis), a sixteenth-century print after Hieronymus Bosch, Baillieu Library, Melbourne.
- The Triumph of Truth (showing Time rescuing Truth), part of the 1622–1625 Marie de' Medici cycle of paintings by Peter Paul Rubens, Louvre.
- Time Vanquished by Love, Hope & Beauty, a 1627 painting by Simon Vouet, features Saturn in his incarnation as Father Time as the central figure, Prado Madrid.
- A Dance to the Music of Time, a 1634–1636 painting by Nicolas Poussin, shows Time strumming a stringed instrument while several allegorical figures dance, Wallace Collection, London.
- Landscape with Time and Truth, a 1639 painting by Nicolas Poussin.
- Time Defending Truth Against the Attacks of Envy and Discord, c. 1641, ceiling painting by Nicolas Poussin.
- Time Reveals the Truth, a 1650 painting by Theodoor van Thulden.
- Time Reveals the Truth: The Allegory, a 1657 painting by Theodoor van Thulden, State Hermitage Museum.
- Time Being Overcome by Truth, a c. 1665 painting by Pietro Liberi, private collection.
- Vanitas: Time Reveals the Truth, a c.1670 painting by Giovanni Domenico Cerrini.
- Time Destroys Beauty, a seventeenth-century painting by Giovanni Domenico Cerrini.
- Time Revealing Truth, late seventeenth or early eighteenth century painting by Sebastiano Ricci Belluno.
- Time Unveiling Truth, a 1733 painting by Jean-François De Troy, National Gallery, London.
- Time Saving Truth from Falsehood and Envy, a 1737 painting by François Le Moyne, Wallace Collection, London.
- Time Unveiling Truth, a c. 1743 painting by Giovanni Battista Tiepolo, Museo Civico Palazzo Chiericati, Vicenza.
- Time Uncovering Truth, a 1745 oval painting by Charles-Joseph Natoire, part of the Waddesdon Rothschild Collections, Aylesbury, UK.
- Time Unveiling Truth, a 1745–1750 painting by Giovanni Battista Tiepolo, Museum of Fine Arts, Boston.
- Time Hunting Envy and Discovering Truth, an eighteenth-century fresco by Giovanni Battista Tiepolo at the Villa Loschi-Zileri outside of Vicenza, Italy.
- Truth Rescued by Time, Witnessed by History, an 1812–1814 painting by Francisco Goya, Nationalmuseum, Stockholm.
- Father Time was the logo for the Elgin Watch Company, with Father Time's traditional hourglass traded out for a pocket watch.

==== Sculpture ====
- Father Time is a weather vane at Lord's Cricket Ground, London, in the shape of Father Time.
- Father Time is the central figure in Lorado Taft's 1922 Chicago fountain, Fountain of Time.
- Father Time, complete with scythe, is the central figure in the Rotunda Clock by John Flanagan, located in the rotunda of the Thomas Jefferson Building of the U.S. Library of Congress in Washington, D.C..
- Father Time and the Virgin is a statue located on the cupola of the Masonic Hall at Mendocino, California.
- An old statue of Father Time sits on the grounds at Sandringham Estate in Norfolk, England.
- A clock featuring Father Time, created by Guéret Frêres, Atelier Cartier, and Vincenti et Cie, may be viewed in the Metropolitan Museum of Art. The museum also owns a drawing that is a study for a similar clock.
- Truth Unveiled by Time is the name and subject of a sculpture by Bernini, though the figure of Time was never executed.

=== Books ===
- Old Father Time appears in the fantasy novel series Nightside by Simon R. Green, as an elderly character tending to peoples' needs for time travel—and in some cases—guidance.
- Father Time appears in the fairy tale themed short story, written by L. Frank Baum. Entitled "The Capture of Father Time". That Father Time was captured by the son of an Arizonian cowboy named Jim because of his foolishness.
- Time is one of the Incarnations of Immortality in Piers Anthony's series of the same name. Time (also referred to as "Chronos") appears in several of the books and is the main character of Bearing an Hourglass. For most of the series he appears as a middle-aged man in a blue robe (which has the power to age to oblivion anything which attacks him) and bearing an hourglass which he can use to control the flow of time and move through both time and space.
- Father Time is painted in the ceiling of the dungeon, in the Edgar Allan Poe's short story "The Pit and the Pendulum".
- In Mitch Albom's book The Time Keeper, Dor, the central character, is Father Time. He is freed from exile and sent to Earth on the condition that he teaches two people on Earth the true importance of time, a teenage girl who does not wish to live anymore, and a dying old billionaire who wishes to live forever.
- "Little Father Time" is a character in Jude the Obscure, a novel by Thomas Hardy. The name is given to Jude Fawley's son, who is dreadfully melancholy and who commits suicide and kills his siblings at a young age.
- Father Time also appears in C. S. Lewis' novels The Silver Chair and The Last Battle which are the final two novels (chronologically) in the series The Chronicles of Narnia.
- In Lewis Carroll's Alice's Adventures in Wonderland, he is referred to as Time and is responsible for making the Hatter and his friends to have an endless tea party as punishment.

=== Comics, magazines and periodicals ===
- Father Time made numerous appearances in the classic comic Little Nemo in Slumberland, both as a general representation of time and as a symbol of the new year.
- A J. C. Leyendecker painting of Father Time appeared on 31 December 1910 cover of The Saturday Evening Post.
- Father Time is a recurring character in Tatsuya Ishida's webcomic Sinfest, often appearing as an infant immediately on or after the Western New Year, and as an old man fated to die during the end of the year.
- Father Time appears in Neil Gaiman's graphic novel The Sandman: Overture, depicted as father to the Endless – seven embodiments of natural forces – through marriage to Mother Night.

=== Film, television and video games ===
- Father Time appears in The Blue Bird played by Thurston Hall.
- The scythe and the hourglass are referenced by the character Johannes in Ordet.
- Father Time appears in Our Mr. Sun voiced by Lionel Barrymore.
- Father Time appears in The Blue Bird played by Robert Morley.
- Father Time appears in the television special Rudolph's Shiny New Year voiced by Red Skelton. He is depicted as an old friend of Santa Claus and serves as the narrator of the special.
- Father Time appears as a recurring character in The Smurfs voiced by Alan Oppenheimer. His workshop is depicted as being underground. Father Time's Reverse Clock was responsible for turning Nat, Snappy, and Slouchy into Smurflings and he can't undo the transformation because of how time works.
- Father Time appears as one of the main characters in Histeria! voiced by Frank Welker.
- In Flint the Time Detective, the Old Timer is depicted as a Father Time-like character.
- Father Time appears in The Santa Clause 2 and The Santa Clause 3: The Escape Clause portrayed by Peter Boyle. He is shown as a member of the Council of Legendary Figures alongside Santa Claus, the Easter Bunny, Cupid, Mother Nature, the Sandman, the Tooth Fairy, and Jack Frost.
- In the Wizards of Waverly Place episode "You Can't Always Get What You Carpet", Justin Russo (David Henrie) says "It's 8:00" and Jerry Russo (David DeLuise) retorts "Who are you, Father Time?"
- Father Time appears in The Grim Adventures of Billy & Mandy episode "The Halls of Time", voiced again by Alan Oppenheimer. He is inspired by the aforementioned Rudolph's Shiny New Year portrayal as he also works with a baby that represents Happy New Year.
- Father Time appears in the Regular Show episode "It's Time", voiced by Alan Sklar, and Regular Show: The Movie, voiced by Fred Tatasciore. He is made out of different types of clocks and wears a purple hat.
- A song in the animated version of Charlotte's Web is titled "Mother Earth and Father Time".
- Father Time (The Sage of Time) is the leader of the Tapestry of Nations parade at Epcot during the Walt Disney World Millennium Celebration.
- Father Time appears in The Fairly OddParents episode "Timmy's Secret Wish!", voiced by Jeff Bennett.
- A ghost in Danny Phantom is similar to Father Time and is named Clockwork (voiced by David Carradine). He is known as the master of time and is depicted as a child, young man, and old man in a constantly changing cycle. Clockwork also has a variety of timekeeping devices on his person, and wields a staff that can be transformed into a scythe. He first appeared in the special episode "The Ultimate Enemy".
- Father Time appeared in a version of YooHoo & Friends produced by David Feiss, where he is voiced by rapper Flavor Flav). He was depicted as a blue Viking-like ogre who transformed five business executives into cute animals.
- Father Time appears in season 3, episode 3 of Boardwalk Empire at Nucky Thompson's New Year's Eve party.
- Father Time appears in the Star vs. the Forces of Evil episodes "Freeze Day", "Mathmagic", and "Beach Day", voiced by Jim Gaffigan.
- In Alice Through the Looking Glass, Sacha Baron Cohen portrays Time, a human/clockwork humanoid who controls all of Wonderland's timeline and possesses a device called the Chronosphere.
- Father Time appears in Sly Cooper: Thieves in Time, where he is encountered by the titular character in Ancient Egypt.
- Ouro Kronii, nicknamed the "Warden of Time", is a VTuber and member of Hololive EN's 2nd Generation (aka the HoloCouncil) who is based on Father Time.

=== Music ===
- "Father Time" is a song, composed by Ralph Towner, from Ralph Towner, Wolfgang Muthspiel and Slava Grigoryan's album "Travel Guide".
- "Father Time" is a song from power metal band Stratovarius's album Episode.
- "Father Time" is a song from power metal band Majestica's album Above the Sky.
- "Father Time" is a song from hard rock band Shark Island's album Law of the Order.
- "Father Time" is the name of a song on Richie Sambora's album Stranger in This Town.
- "Father Time" is the name of a song on Blind Melon's album For My Friends.
- "Father Time" is the name of a song on Animal Collective's album Centipede Hz.
- "Father Time" is the name of a song on Kendrick Lamar's album Mr. Morale & the Big Steppers.
- "Father Time" is the name of a song on Jon Oliva's solo album Raise the Curtain.
- "FatherTime" is the name of a song on Bones (rapper) album OFFLINE.
- "Old Father Time" is the name of a song on Peter Yarrow's album That's Enough for Me.
- "Father Time" is the nickname for bassist Leland Sklar.
- "Father Time" is referenced in Lil' Wayne's song 6 Foot 7 Foot.
- "Father Time" is referenced in the Death Cab for Cutie song What Sarah Said.
- "Father Time" is referenced in the Metallica song Minus Human.
- "Father Time" and "Chronos" are referenced in the Megadeth two-part song Time: The Beginning and Time: The End.
- "Father Time" is referenced in the Mark Chesnutt and Don Everly song Brother Jukebox.
- "Father Time" is referenced in the Parkway Drive song Home Is for the Heartless.
- "Father Time" is referenced in the Deep Purple song I'll Catch You.
- "Father Time" is referenced in Aesop Rock's song Float.

== See also ==
- Corpus Clock, with the beastly-looking "chronophage" ("time eater"), a kind of personification of time
- Kaal
- Methuselah
- God the Father
- Mother Nature
- Zurvan
