= Truth Unveiled by Time =

Truth Unveiled by Time may refer to:

- Truth Unveiled by Time (Bernini), a 1646–52 sculpture by Gian Lorenzo Bernini
- Time Reveals the Truth, a 1650 painting by Theodoor van Thulden
- Time Reveals the Truth: The Allegory, a 1657 painting by Theodoor van Thulden
- Vanitas: Time Reveals the Truth, a c.1670 painting by Gian Domenico Cerrini
- Time Revealing Truth, late seventeenth- or early eighteenth-century painting by Sebastiano Ricci Belluno
- Time Unveiling Truth (Tiepolo), a 1745–50 painting by Giovanni Battista Tiepolo
- Time Unveiling Truth, a 1733 painting by Jean-François De Troy
- Time Unveiling Truth, a c.1743 painting by Giambattista Tiepolo
- Time Uncovering Truth, a 1745 painting by Charles-Joseph Natoire
