= Zimmerli Art Museum at Rutgers University =

Art museum in New Brunswick, New Jersey

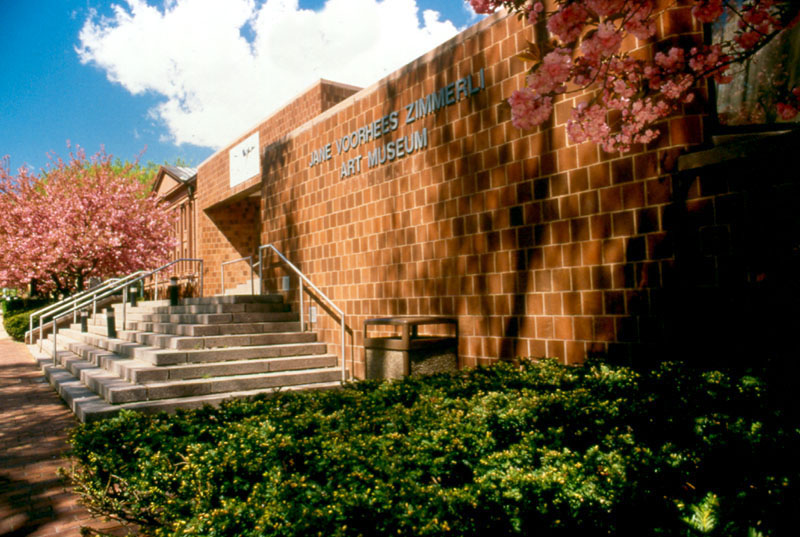
- The front of the Zimmerli Art Museum at Rutgers University
- Interactive fullscreen map
- Established: 1966
- Location: New Brunswick, New Jersey
- Coordinates: 40°30′00″N 74°26′46″W
- Type: Art
- Director: Maura Reilly
- Public transit access: New Brunswick Station (New Jersey Transit)
- Website: zimmerli.rutgers.edu

The Jane Voorhees Zimmerli Art Museum (known popularly as the Zimmerli Art Museum) is located on the Voorhees Mall of the campus of Rutgers University in New Brunswick, New Jersey. The museum houses more than 60,000 works, including Russian and Soviet Nonconformist Art from the acclaimed Dodge Collection, American art from the eighteenth century to the present, and six centuries of European art with a particular focus on nineteenth-century French art. The museum also is noted for its holdings of works on paper, including prints, drawings, photographs, original illustrations for children's books, and rare books.

== Description ==
Founded in 1966 as the Rutgers University Art Gallery to celebrate the university bicentennial, the gallery was expanded in 1983 and renamed the Jane Voorhees Zimmerli Art Museum in honor of the mother of Ralph and Alan Voorhees, the major benefactors for the museum expansion.

The museum occupies a 70,000-square-foot facility, which is located on the New Brunswick campus of Rutgers University the state university of New Jersey.

The permanent collection of the museum totals more than 75,000 works in a wide range of media and includes a survey of Western art from the fifteenth century to the present. The museum has holdings in:

- Nineteenth-century French art, particularly prints and rare books
- Russian art and Soviet nonconformist art from the Dodge Collection
- American art, especially prints

Selections from these holdings, along with focused presentations of European art, art inspired by Japan (called Japonisme), ancient Greek art, ancient Roman art, Pre-Columbian art, and American illustrations for children's books, are always on view. The museum also makes these holdings available through an active program of loans to art museums, both nationally and internationally, as well as through participation in Google Arts & Culture and ARTstor.

== Programs and exhibitions ==
The Zimmerli Art Museum presents exhibitions as a teaching museum with an interdisciplinary perspective. The museum is now free for all visitors and offers tours for groups. The museum also houses a café.

As a teaching museum, it contributes to the academic programs of undergraduate and graduate students at Rutgers, and it also offers programs to the broader community. Rutgers faculty from both the humanities and the sciences use the museum for their classes to stimulate interdisciplinary inquiry among undergraduate and graduate students from all areas of study. The museum collaborates with the university department of art history in its curatorial training programs, as well as through its endowed fellowships and internships for graduate students seeking careers in the museum field.

The museum provides interactive tours that are designed for elementary and secondary student age groups and academic requirements. Teachers of K-12 students may benefit from workshops that the museum organizes in collaboration with the Rutgers Graduate School of Education and satisfy mandated professional development requirements. In addition, the museum offers drawing workshops for all ages, as well as storytelling for preschoolers and day trips for adults who wish to learn more about specific aspects of art.

== Permanent collection ==
=== American art ===
The Zimmerli Art Museum's American art collection contains more than 16,500 objects. It includes paintings, sculpture, works on paper (prints, drawings, and photographs), and decorative arts. The earliest paintings in the Zimmerli collection date to the late eighteenth century, when the United States and Rutgers University – then called Queen's College – were in their infancy. Reflecting America's rich artistic and cultural heritage, the museum showcases examples of portraiture, landscape, still life, narrative art, and abstraction. Modern and contemporary styles represented in the collection include precisionism, surrealism, abstract expressionism, geometric abstraction, pop art, op art, Fluxus, photo-realism, and minimalism, as well as works that explore social and political issues. Work by women artists is a distinguishing aspect of the museum's American holdings and signals the pioneering role of Rutgers in women's studies.

=== European art ===
The Zimmerli collection of European art comprises paintings, sculpture, works on paper, rare books, and decorative arts, and ranges in date from the Renaissance to the present, totaling close to 10,000 objects, with its primary strength in French nineteenth-century works on paper, notably prints and rare books. Strongly represented subjects include portraits and caricatures, landscapes, and popular entertainments. Also among the European holdings is a renowned collection of Japonisme, late-nineteenth-century works by European artists inspired by Japanese art and aesthetics.

In 2011, the Zimmerli restituted a rare Renaissance portrait by Hans Baldung Grien to the heirs of Friedrich and Louise Gutmann who had been murdered by Nazis in concentration camps. The painting had been donated to Rutgers by Rudolf Heinemann who, according to the Zimmerli, had acquired it from Rosenberg and Stiebel.

=== Russian art and Soviet nonconformist art ===
The Zimmerli Russian and Soviet nonconformist art holdings contain some 22,000 objects and provide an overview of art in Russia from the fourteenth century to the present. The Imperial era of Russian art is represented through George Riabov's 1990 donation, which spans styles and subjects that represent Russia's diverse artistic heritage, genres, and visual cultures.

The Dodge Collection is the largest collection of Soviet Nonconformist Art in the United States of America. The collection was amassed by an economics professor from the University of Maryland, Norton Dodge, from the late 1950s until the advent of Perestroika. The collection was gift of Norton and Nancy Dodge in 1991. More than 20,000 works by close to 1,000 artists reveal a culture that defied the politically imposed conventions of Socialist Realism. All media are represented, including paintings on canvas and panel, sculpture, assemblage, decorative objects, installations, works on paper, photography, video, artists’ books and self-published texts called "samizdat". This encyclopedic array of nonconformist art extends from about 1956 to 1986, from the beginning of Khrushchev's cultural "thaw" to the advent of Gorbachev's glasnost and perestroika. Work created during the Gorbachev era (through 1991) also is represented. The collection includes art made in Russia, as well as many examples of nonconformist art produced in the Soviet republics: Armenia, Azerbaijan, Belarus, Estonia, Georgia, Kazakhstan, Kyrgyzstan, Latvia, Lithuania, Turkmenistan, Ukraine, and Uzbekistan. A recent gift by Claude and Nina Gruen extends the Zimmerli Russian art holdings to post-Perestroika work produced since 1986. Many of these artworks were made by former Soviet artists now living in the diaspora. In addition, the museum has seven archives associated with Soviet nonconformist art. Collectively, these archives include more than 50,000 items.

The Dodge Collection includes work by Russian painter Irina Nakhova, who in 2015 was selected as the first woman to represent Russia with a solo show of her artwork in its pavilion at the Venice Biennale.
