= Baby New Year =

Personification of the New Year

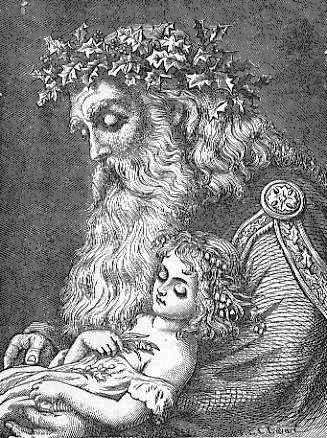
1897 Baby New Year with Father Time

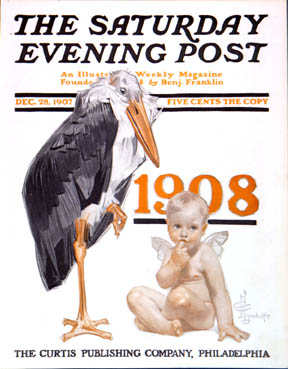
1908 Baby New Year on the cover of The Saturday Evening Post

The Baby New Year is a personification of the start of the New Year commonly seen in editorial cartoons. He symbolizes the "birth" of the next year and the "passing" of the prior year; in other words, a "rebirth". Baby New Year's purpose varies by myth, but he generally performs some sort of ceremonial duty over the course of his year such as chronicling the year's events or presiding over the year as a symbol.

== History ==
Early known instances of having babies as parts of new years traditions date back to ancient Greece. Modern use was popularized at the beginning of the 20th century.

== Legend ==
The myth most associated with him is that he is a baby at the beginning of his year, but Baby New Year quickly ages until he is elderly (like Father Time, with whom he is often associated) at the end of his year. Very rarely is the Baby New Year depicted as any age other than a baby or as a very old man. Some stories, especially those with depictions of years past, will have him bear a strong likeness to key events in his time. At this point, he hands over his duties to the next Baby New Year, while he either dies or remains in this state and retires.

== Representation ==
The stereotypical representation of Baby New Year is as a baby boy wearing nothing more than a diaper, a top hat and a sash across his torso that shows the year he is representing (e.g. 2026). He is sometimes depicted holding or associated with an hourglass, a noisemaker, or other item either pertaining to time or New Year's Day festivities. Often, he is not a complete newborn but instead more closely resembles a toddler, because he is frequently shown standing on his own, crawling or barely walking, or having a small amount of (usually blond) hair.

== Use as a title ==
In addition to being a mythical figure, the title of "Baby New Year" is sometimes given to living people. The first baby born in any village or city in a certain year may be honored by being labeled as the official Baby New Year for that year. The official Baby New Year can be male or female, even though the mythical Baby New Year is nearly always male. Attempts to name an official Baby New Year for an entire country have sometimes been made, but generally there are multiple contenders and no single Baby New Year can be confirmed. There has however been some who have come close. Numerous hospitals no longer make a Baby New Year public due to concerns that the infant will become a target for criminals.

== In popular culture ==
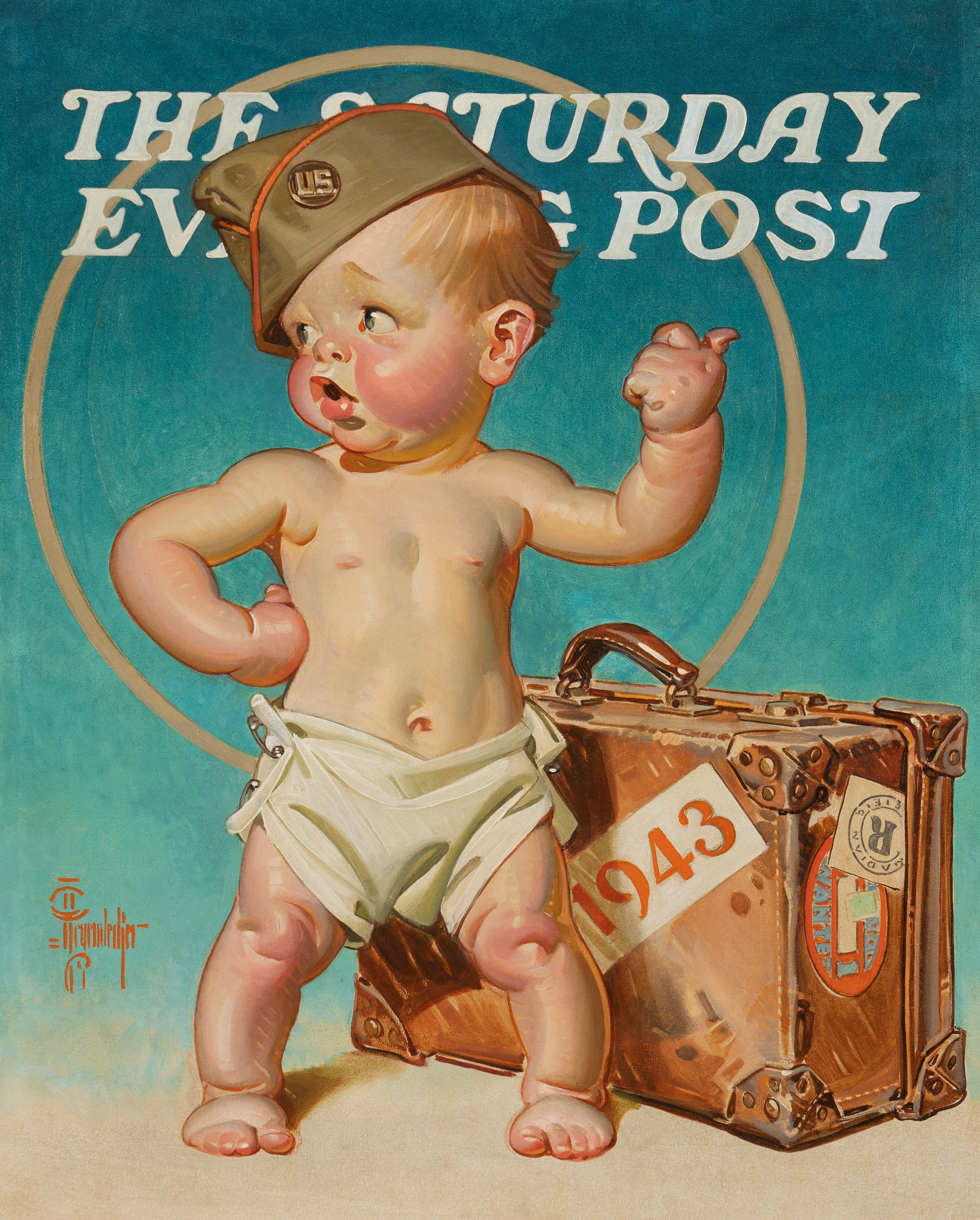
Unused art of Baby New Year for 1943, where he hitch-hikes to war. (J. C. Leyendecker)

- Baby New Year is featured in the TV special Rudolph's Shiny New Year. The featured Baby New Year, named Happy, goes missing before New Year's Eve, and Rudolph has to travel to the Archipelago of Last Years (a bunch of islands where the old years go to retire) to find him before a vulture named Aeon the Terrible gets to him in order to keep the year from ending and stop time, thus preventing his predestined death. Happy ran away due to being laughed at because of his big ears, which he wears under his top hat. Rudolph shows Happy his nose and tells him his own story of being shunned because of his nonconformity before asking Happy to let him see his ears. After Happy's ears play a part in defeating Aeon the Terrible, Happy is returned to Father Time as the year "Nineteen-Wonderful" begins.
- A parody of Baby New Year, given the name "Big Fat Baby", appears in the animated series Histeria!
- A version of Baby New Year named "Happy New Year" appears alongside Father Time in the episode "The Halls of Time" of the animated series The Grim Adventures of Billy & Mandy.
- He also appears as one of the holiday mascots in the animated series The Fairly OddParents.
