= Rakové =

- Village
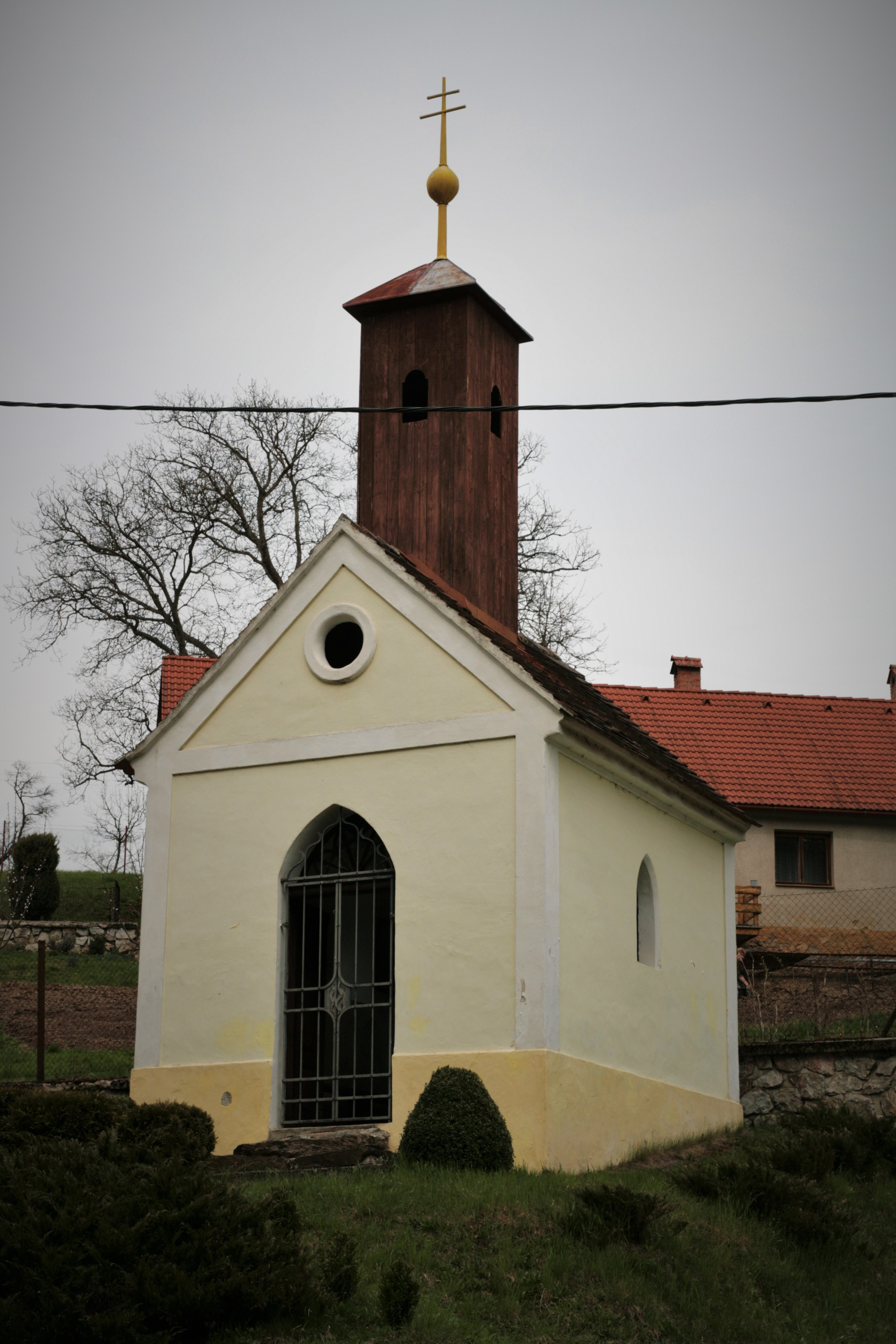
- The chapel in Rakové

- Location in the Czech Republic
- Coordinates: 49°25′33″N 16°19′5″E
- Country: Czech Republic
- Region: South Moravian
- District: Brno-Country
- Municipality: Olší
- First mentioned: 1235

Area
  - Total: 1.21 km^{2} (0.47 sq mi)

Population (2021-01-01)
  - Total: 5
  - Density: 4.1/km^{2} (11/sq mi)
- Time zone: UTC+1 (CET)
  - Summer (DST): UTC+2 (CEST)
- Postal code: 592 61

Rakové is a village, part of the municipality of Olší in Brno-Country District in the South Moravian Region. It is located in the Upper Svratka Highlands, in the Svratecká hornatina Nature Park, about 2.5 kilometres (1.6 mi) east of Olší. It has 5 inhabitants. The cadastral territory of Rakové has an area of 1.21 square kilometres (0.47 sq mi).

== History ==
The first written mention of the village dates back to 1235. Rakové has been part of Olší since 1964.

On 1 January 2005, the village of Rakové, as part of the municipality of Olší, together with 23 other municipalities, was transferred from the Žďár nad Sázavou District (Vysočina Region) to the Brno-Country District (South Moravian Region).

== Demographics ==
Historical population
Year	Pop.	±%
1869	74	—
1880	74	+0.0%
1890	70	−5.4%
1900	67	−4.3%
1910	59	−11.9%
1921	58	−1.7%
1930	43	−25.9%
1950	42	−2.3%
1961	23	−45.2%
1970	14	−39.1%
1980	5	−64.3%
1991	0	−100.0%
2001	4	—
2011	4	+0.0%
2021	5	+25.0%
Source: Censuses
