= Mendocino Presbyterian Church =

Historic church in California, United States

Coordinates: 39.3049°N 123.7967°W

- U.S. Historic district – Contributing property
- California Historical Landmark
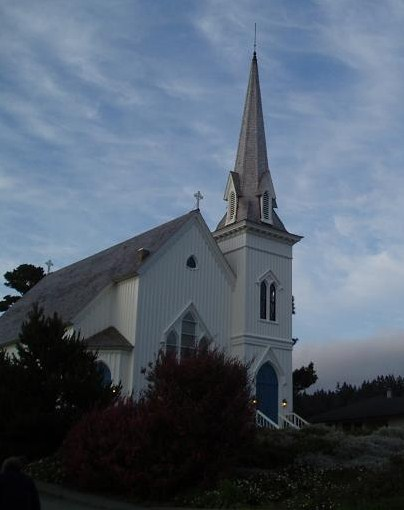
- Mendocino Presbyterian Church
- Location: 44831 Main Street; Mendocino, California
- Built: 1867-1868
- Architect: S. C. Bugbee & Son of San Francisco, architects; Albert Maxwell, contractor
- Architectural style: Carpenter Gothic
- Part of: Mendocino and Headlands Historic District (ID71000165)
- CHISL No.: 714

The Mendocino Presbyterian Church is a historic Carpenter Gothic-style Presbyterian church building located at 44831 Main Street, in Mendocino, California. Built of coast redwood, it sits on the Mendocino headlands overlooking the Pacific Ocean; its board and batten exterior walls, tall side-entrance bell tower, steep gabled roof and lancet windows are typical of many Carpenter Gothic churches. Its stained glass windows were made by local stained glass artist Leone McNeil Zimmer.

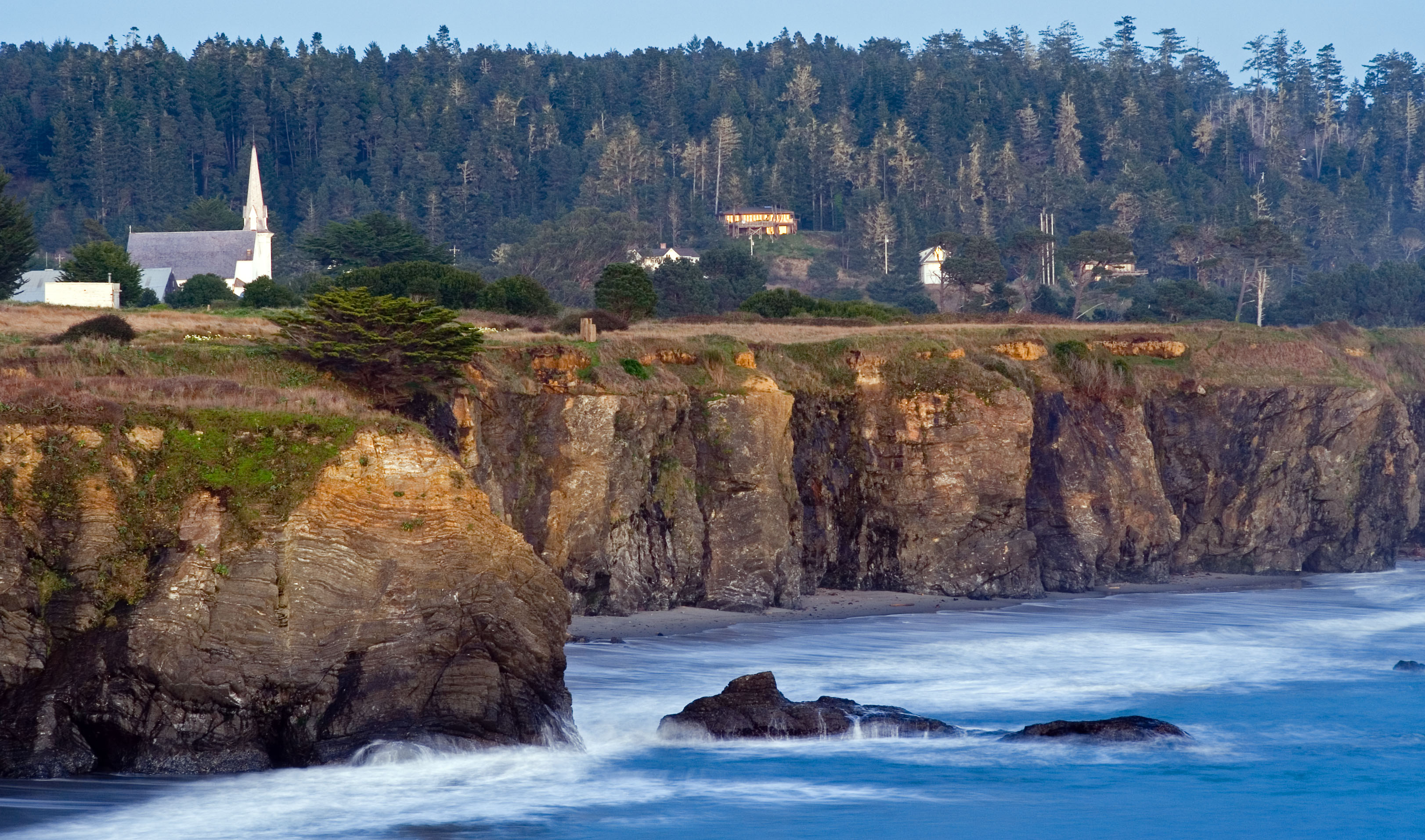
Mendocino and its headlands with the Presbyterian Church in the upper left

The church is California Historical Landmark No. 714 and is also a contributing property in the Mendocino and Headlands Historic District which was added on July 14, 1971, to the National Register of Historic Places.

== History ==
The church was designed by architects S. C. Bugbee & Son of San Francisco and was built between 1867 and 1868 at a cost of $10,000 by contractor Albert Maxwell. On July 5, 1868, it was formally dedicated. It served as the model for the smaller but more elaborate Church of the Good Shepherd, Berkeley that S. C. Bugbee's son Charles L. Bugbee designed in the late 1880s.

In 1947 parts of the movie Johnny Belinda, which starred Jane Wyman and Lew Ayres, were filmed on the premises and the church received enough money to buy a new roof.

== Current status ==
Today the church is an active congregation in the Presbyterian Church (U.S.A.), and is one of the oldest continuously used Protestant churches in California. The Rev. Matthew E. Davis is the current pastor.
