= Dodge Gulch =

Valley in California, US

- Location within California

Geography
- Coordinates: 39°44′13″N 123°49′14″W
- Interactive map of Dodge Gulch

Dodge Gulch is a valley located near Westport in Mendocino County, California.
