= Episcopal Church of the Good Shepherd (Berkeley, California) =

Historic church in California, United States

- Church of the Good Shepherd-Episcopal
- U.S. National Register of Historic Places
- Berkeley Landmark
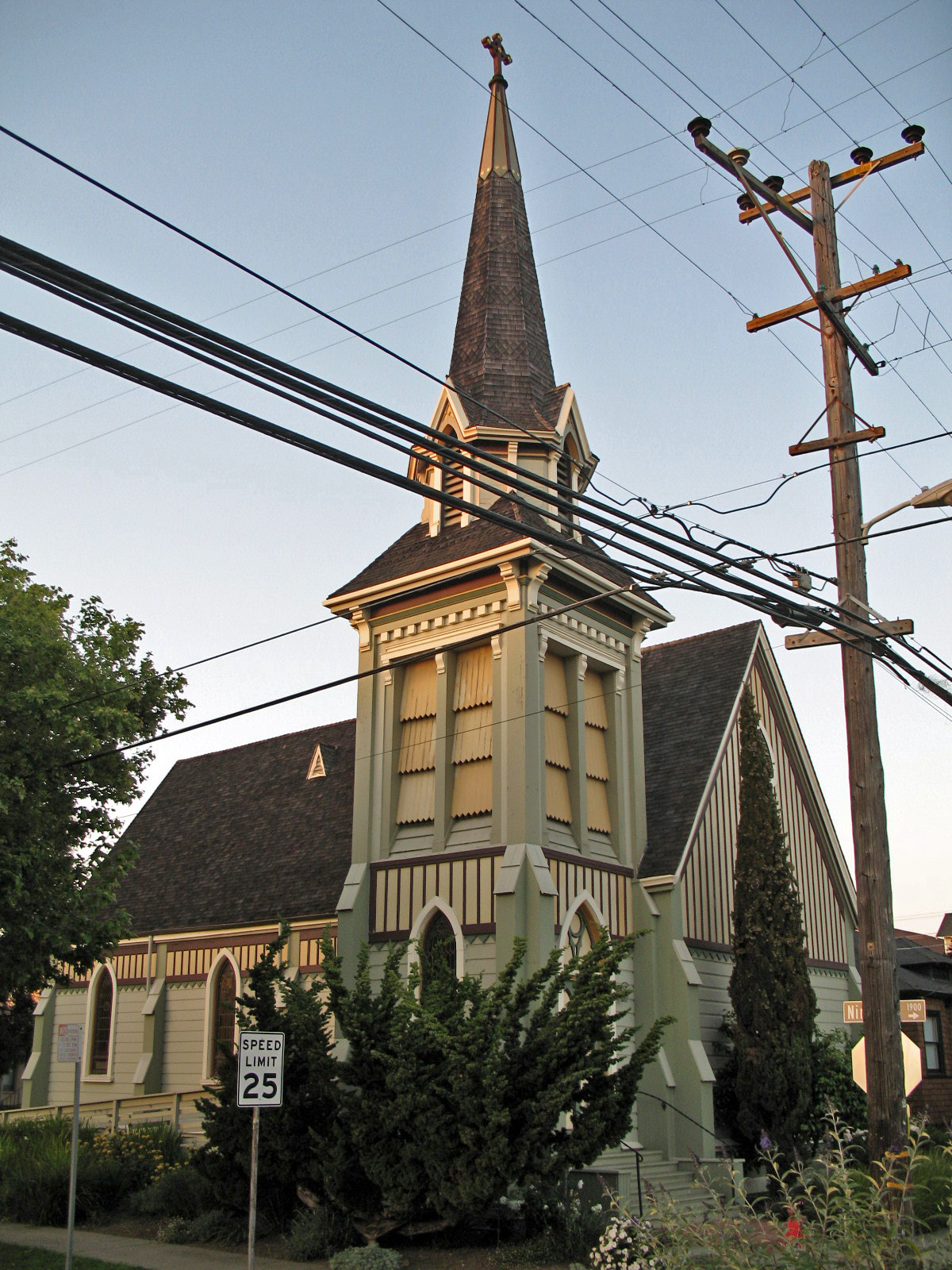

- Location within Oakland, California Location within California Location within the United States
- Location: 1001 Hearst St. at Ninth St., Berkeley, California
- Coordinates: 37°52′13″N 122°17′37″W
- Area: less than one acre
- Built: 1878
- Architects: architect: Charles L. Bugbee; builder: G. W. French
- Architectural style: Gothic, Victorian Carpenter Gothic
- NRHP reference No.: 86003361
- BERKL No.: 6

Significant dates
- Added to NRHP: December 1, 1986
- Designated BERKL: December 15, 1975

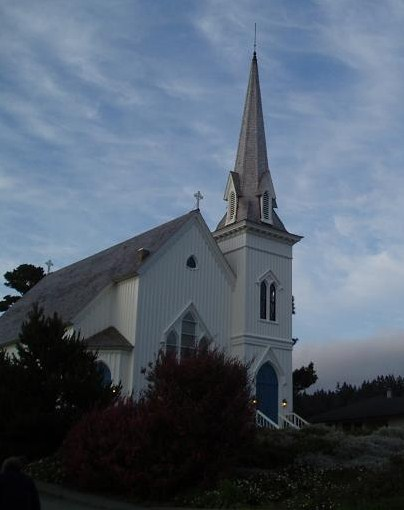
Mendocino Presbyterian Church, the model for this church

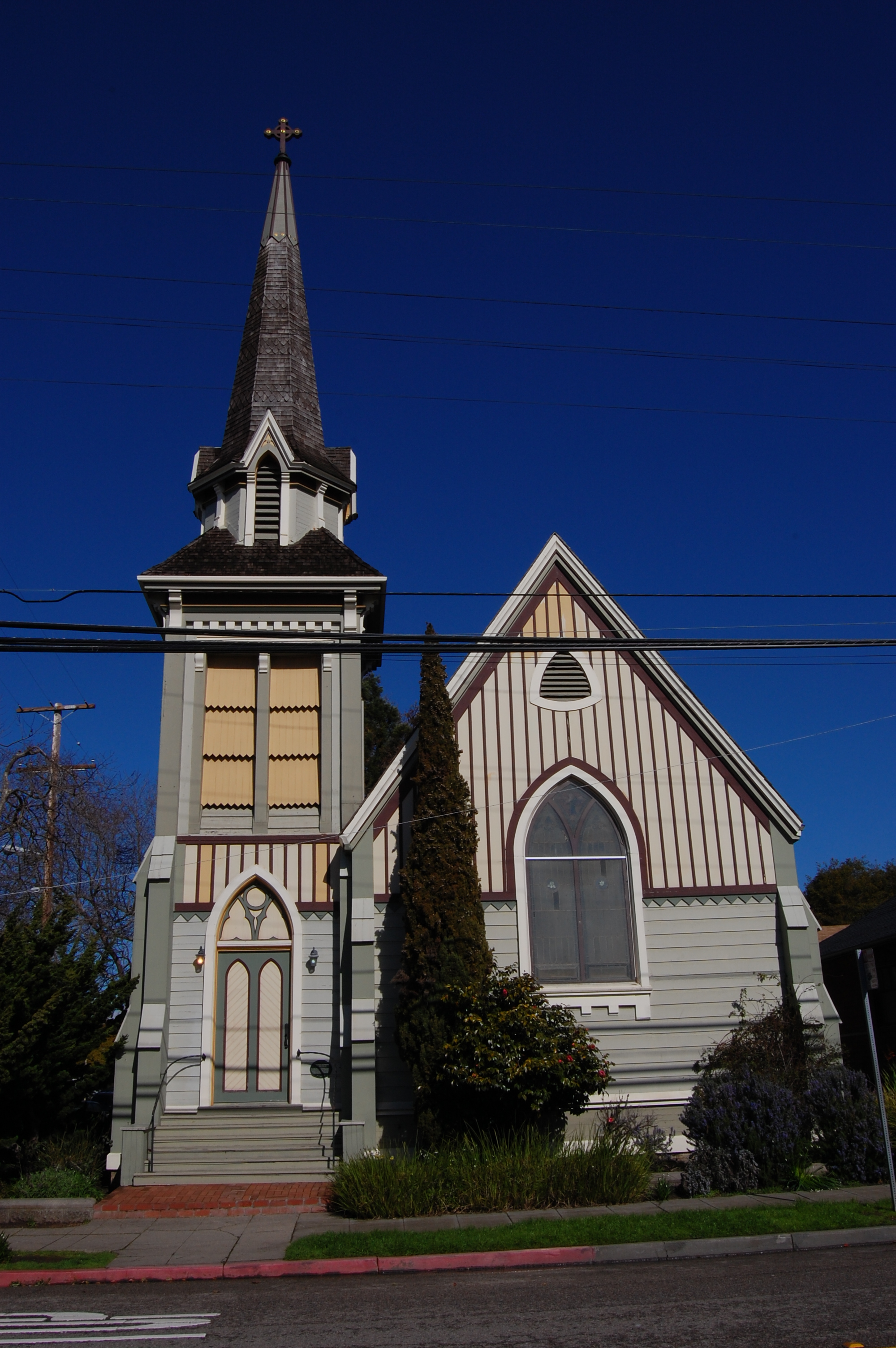
Front facade

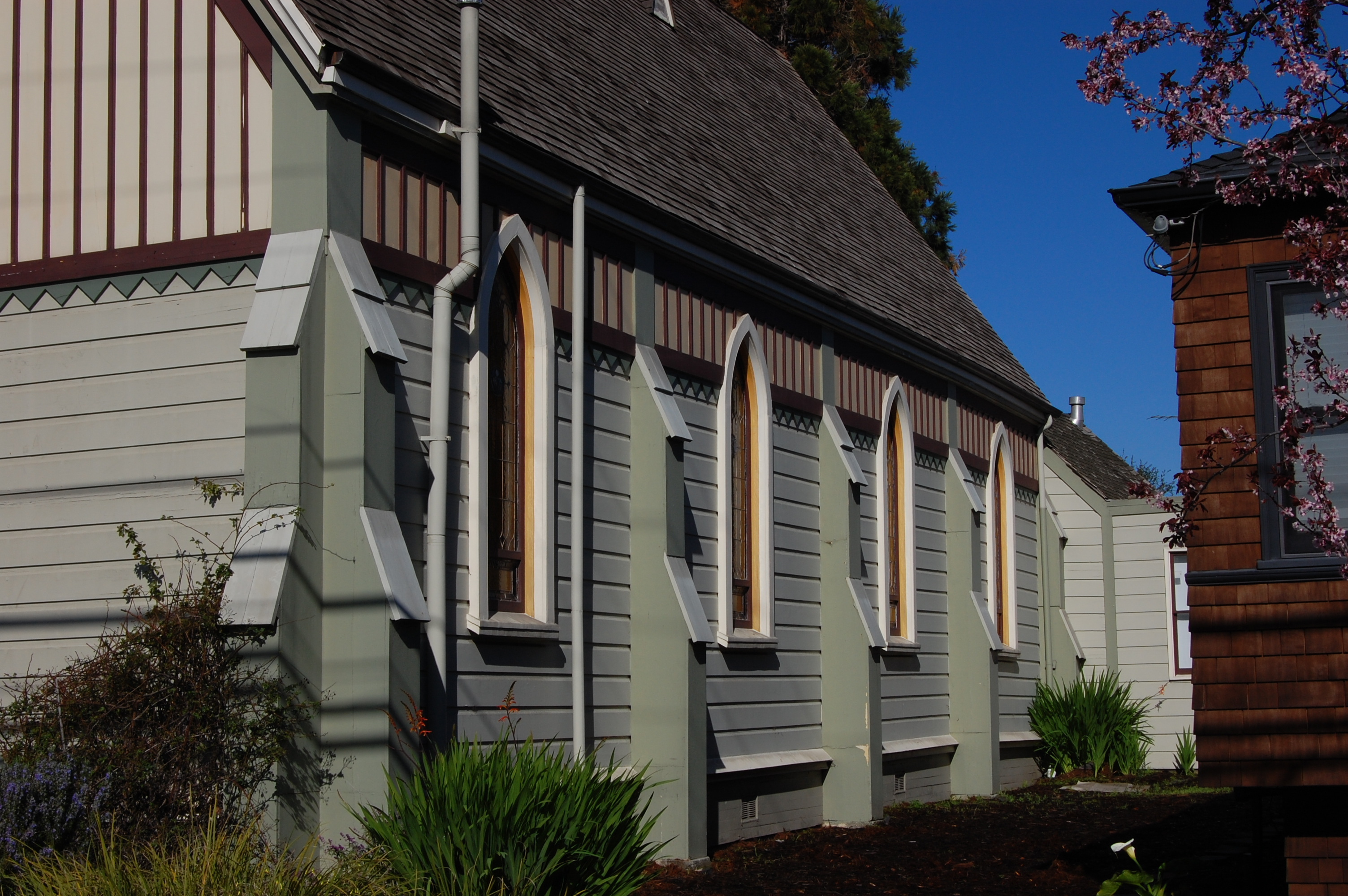
Side detail showing ornamental buttresses

The Episcopal Church of the Good Shepherd is an historic Carpenter Gothic style Episcopal church building located at 1001 Hearst Street at Ninth Street (1823 Ninth Street) in Berkeley, California. Built in 1878, it was designed in the Carpenter Gothic style of architecture by architect Charles L. Bugbee who was associated with his father Samuel C. Bugbee in the San Francisco firm of S. C. Bugbee & Son. Charles L. Bugbee patterned it after the Carpenter Gothic style Mendocino Presbyterian Church, which the firm had designed in 1867. While all of the Mendocino church's exterior walls are of board and batten siding, only the upper walls of Good Shepherd are board and batten while the lower walls are of Dutch lap weatherboarding. Both churches feature tall side-entrance bell towers, steep gabled roofs and lancet windows, but according to writer Daniella Thompson: "...the Church of the Good Shepherd is considerably more ornate and playful than its severe Presbyterian model, ..." On December 15, 1975, Good Shepherd became the second building in Berkeley to be named an Historic Landmark. On December 1, 1986, it was added to the National Register of Historic Places as the Church of the Good Shepherd-Episcopal.

== Current status ==
The Episcopal Church of the Good Shepherd is still an active parish in the Episcopal Diocese of California. The current priest-in-charge is the Reverend Este Gardner Cantor. Its associate pastor is the well-known theologian William Countryman.
