= Rudolph J. Heinemann =

German-born American art dealer and collector (1901–1975)

- Born: 1901; Germany
- Died: February 7, 1975 (aged 73–74); Lugano, Switzerland
- Occupations: Art dealer and collector
- Spouse: Loretta Leiter

Rudolph J. Heinemann, also known as Rudolf J. Heinemann, (1901 – February 7, 1975) was a German-born American art dealer and collector of Old Masters. He was an advisor to Baron Hans Heinrich Thyssen-Bornemisza, and helped him established a museum in Lugano, Switzerland. Heinemann and later, his wife Lore, donated works of art to the Metropolitan Museum of Art, the Frick Collection, the National Gallery of Art, and the Morgan Library & Museum.

== Early life ==
Heinemann was born in 1901 in Germany. His father and grandfather were art dealers. He was educated in Munich, Berlin, and Florence.

== Career ==
Heinemann began his career as an assistant at his father's Galerie Heinemann in Munich. After his father's death in 1931, he became the owner of the gallery. In 1935, he emigrated to the United States and established his art gallery in New York City. His clients included the Museum of Fine Arts in Boston, to whom he sold Time Unveiling Truth by Giovanni Battista Tiepolo in 1961.

Heinemann was an advisor to Baron Hans Heinrich Thyssen-Bornemisza. It was under Heinemann's expertise that Baron Thyssen-Bornemisza established the Thyssen Museum in Lugano, Switzerland. (The museum collection was later moved to the Thyssen-Bornemisza Museum in Madrid, Spain.) Heinemann served on the board of the New York University Institute of Fine Arts.

Heinemann collected Old Masters. According to The New York Times, his became "one of the finest collections of Old Master paintings and drawings in private hands." With his wife, Heinemann donated works of art to the Metropolitan Museum of Art, the National Gallery of Art, and the Morgan Library & Museum.

== Nazi-looted art ==
A painting by Hans Baldung Grien that Heinemann had donated to the Zimmerli Art Museum at Rutgers University in New Brunswick, New Jersey, had to be restituted to the Goodman/Gutmann family when it was found to have been looted by Nazis from Fritz Gutmann, a Jewish collector murdered in the Holocaust.

In 2015, an El Greco painting that had passed through Heinemann's Pinakos Gallery, Portrait of a Gentleman, was restituted to the heirs of Julius Priester, after the painting's false provenance was discovered to conceal Nazi looting of the Priester collection. Heinemann had purchased the El Greco from art dealer Frederick Mont.

In 2019, the heirs to the Nazi businessman Rudolf-August Oetker restituted Carl Spitzweg's Der Hexenmeister to the family of Leo Bendel, who had been murdered by the Nazis. The painting was auctioned at Galerie Heinemann in Munich in 1937.

== Personal life and death ==
Heinemann married Loretta Leiter. They resided at 907 Fifth Avenue on the Upper East Side of Manhattan. Heinemann became a naturalized U.S. citizen in 1941. Lore Heinemann donated Tiepolo drawings to the Morgan Library. Rudolf and Lore Heinemann also made donations to the National Gallery of Art and the Metropolitan Museum of Art.

Heinemann died on February 7, 1975, in Lugano, Switzerland.

== See also ==
- List of claims for restitution for Nazi-looted art
- Karl Haberstock
