= Mendocino and Headlands Historic District =

Historic district in California, United States

- U.S. National Register of Historic Places
- U.S. Historic district
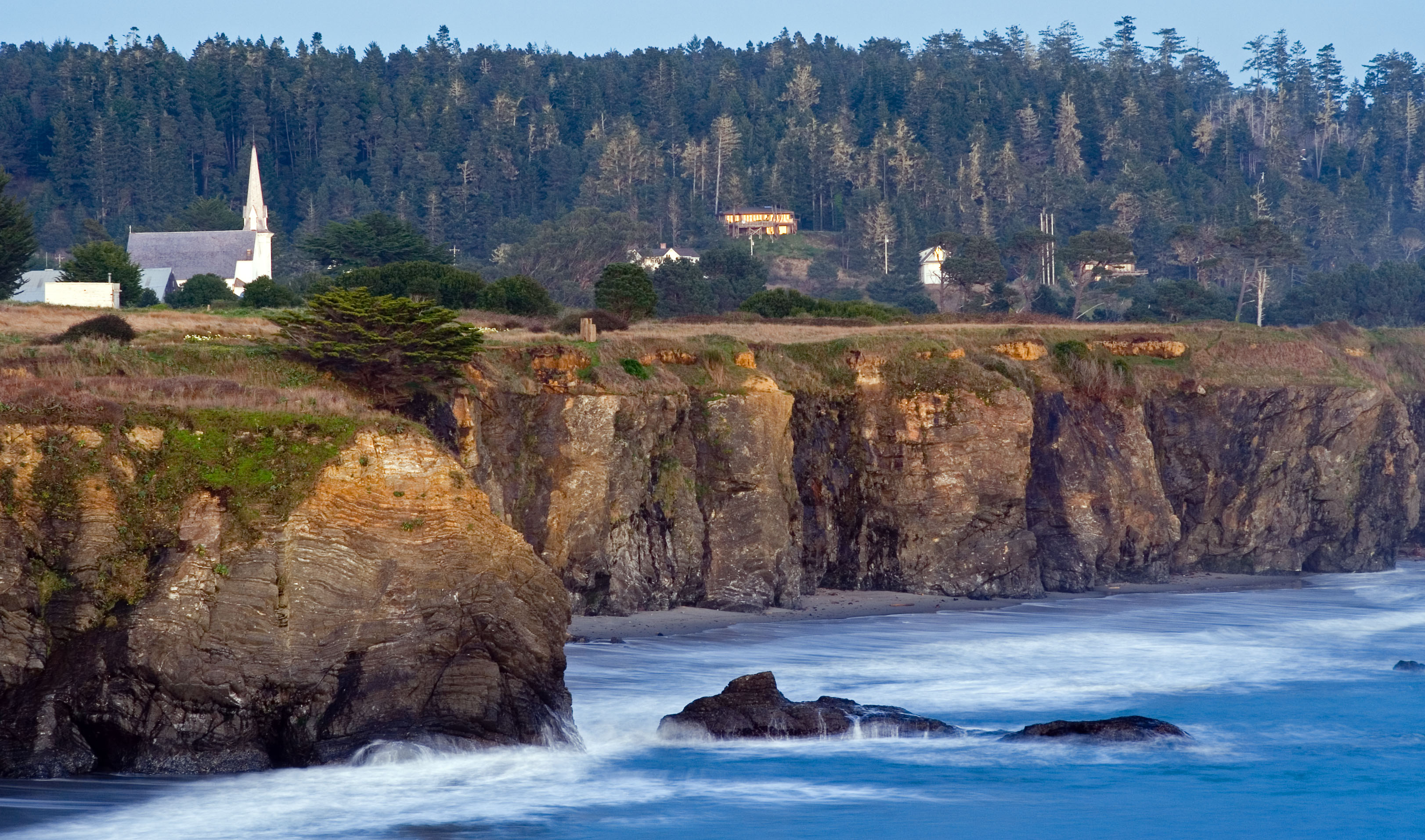
- Mendocino and headlands

- Location within California Location within the United States
- Location: Bounded roughly by the Pacific Ocean on the W and S, Little Lake St. on the N, and CA 1 on the E, Mendocino, California
- Coordinates: 39°18′30″N 123°48′23″W
- Area: 130 acres (53 ha)
- Architectural style: Victorian
- NRHP reference No.: 71000165
- Added to NRHP: July 14, 1971

The Mendocino and Headlands Historic District is a nationally recognized and locally protected historic district in Mendocino, California. It is bounded roughly by the Pacific Ocean on the west and south, Little Lake Street on the north and California State Route 1 on the east. It is filled with historic late 19th Century buildings built from local redwood, such as the Mendocino Presbyterian Church and the Masonic Hall. Because of its resemblance to coastal villages in New England and the Maritime Provinces of Canada, it has been used often as the location for movies such as Johnny Belinda (1947) with Jane Wyman and Lew Ayres, which was set in Prince Edward Island, and TV series such as Murder She Wrote (1984–1996) with Angela Lansbury, which was set in Maine.

On July 14, 1971, it was added to the National Register of Historic Places. It is also protected by historic preservation provisions enacted by the Mendocino County government. A visitor center and museum are located in the historic Ford House.

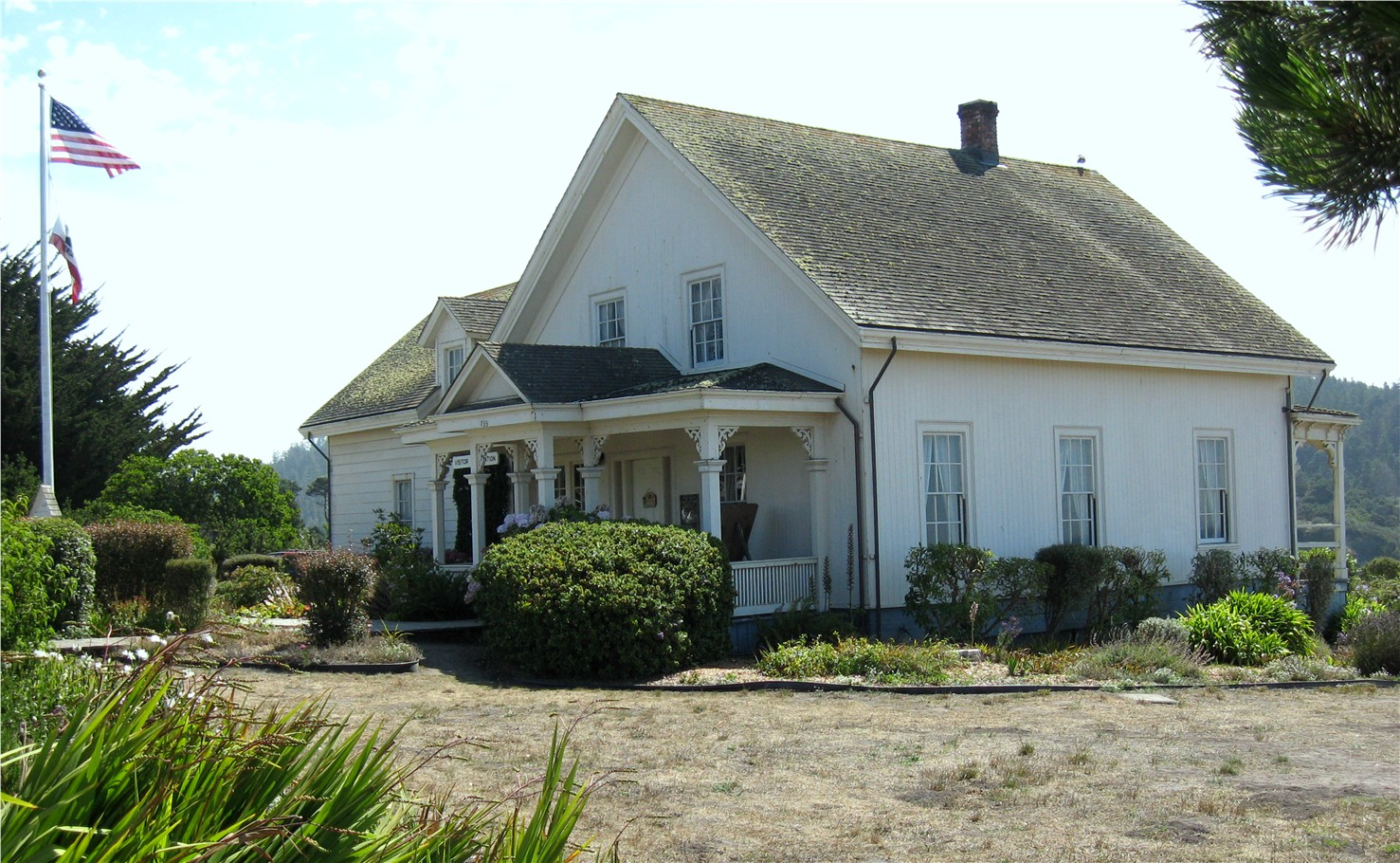
Ford House Museum

== See also ==
- Mendocino Headlands State Park
