= Julius Priester =

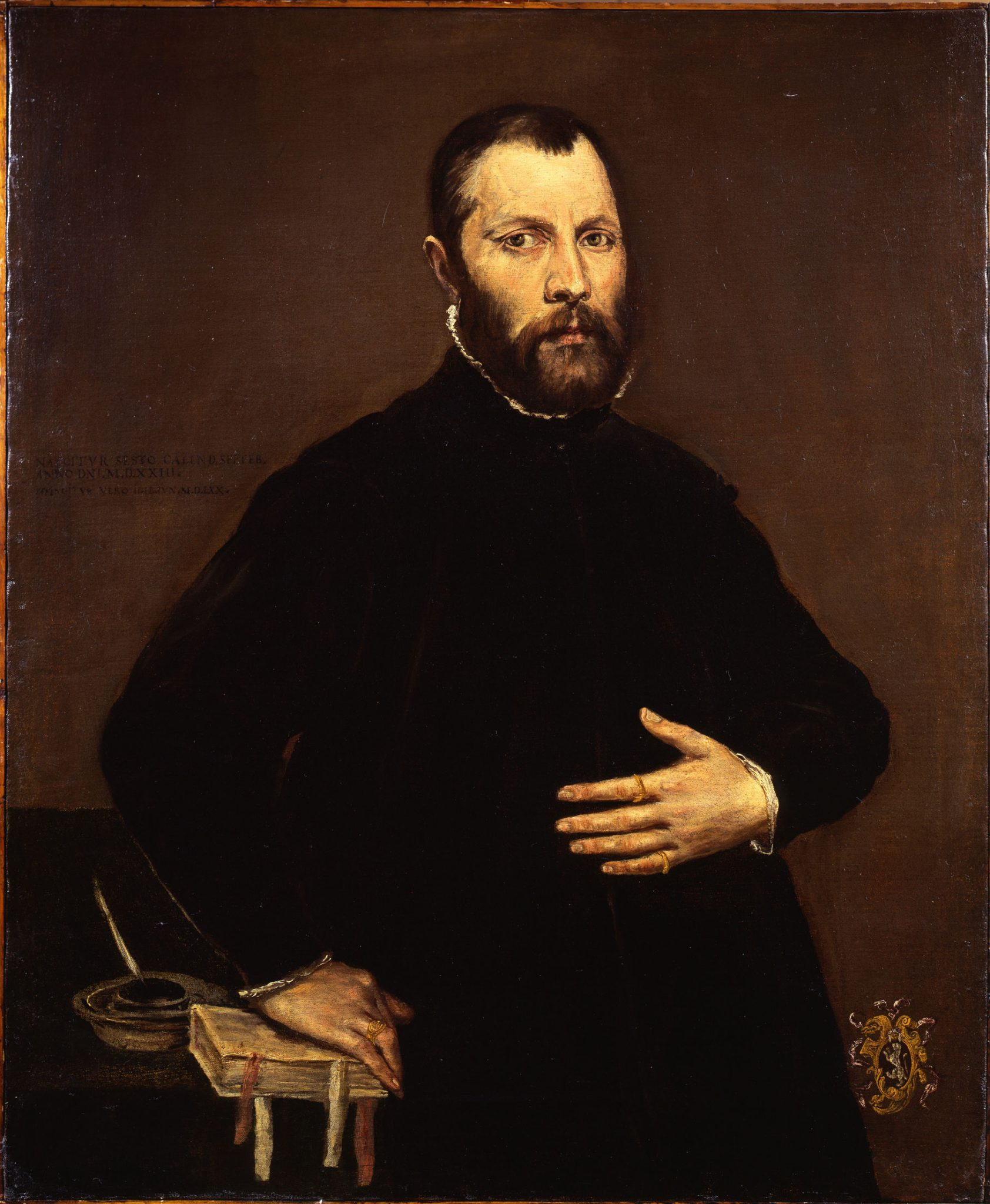
El Greco's Portrait of a Gentleman, looted by Nazis from the collection of Julius Priester, was restituted to his heirs in 2015

Julius Priester (4 September 1870 – 6 February 1955) was an Austrian Jewish industrialist and art collector in Vienna. His properties and art collection were looted by the Nazis.

== Life ==
Julius Priester was born on 4 September 1870 in Olší, Bohemia, Austria-Hungary. He was an art collector, a banker, an industrialist and President of the Petroleumgesellschaft Galizin GmbH, also known as the Anglo-Galician Company. A collector of Old Master paintings, he displayed them in his office and in his home in Vienna in the 1920s.

He died on 6 February 1955 in Acapulco, Mexico.

== Art collection ==
Priester's art collection included El Greco, Cranach, Rubens, Van Dyke and many other important artists.

== Nazi persecution ==
Austria joined Nazi Germany in the Anschluss of 1938. Persecution of Jews began immediately. Priester fled to Mexico with Camilla Priester (née Robicek). Everything in his apartment was packed up and stored with Speditionsfirma Max Föhr.

On 11 May 1939 the contents of the apartment were valued and inventoried under the supervision of the Gestapo and the Customs Investigation Office, in the presence of civil servants of the Zentralstelle für Denkmalschutz (Austrian Heritage Office) and three appraisers from Vienna's Dorotheum auction house, one of them named Bernhard Wittke who was also an SS officer and agent of the Gestapo.... On 11 February 1944 the Priester collection was forcibly removed in six trucks by the Gestapo

In February 1944, Mr. Priester's possessions including paintings were seized by the Gestapo from Max Föhr's depot in Vienna.The Austrian Nazi looting organization, the Vugesta, the "Verwertungsstelle für jüdisches Umzugsgut der Gestapo", is thought to have been involved in the seizure of Priester's collection.

== Lawsuits and restitutions ==
As soon as World War II ended, in 1945, Priester started trying to recover his stolen art collection. The process was exceedingly slow and difficult. On 20 May 1947 Max Föhr, through Mr. Priester's solicitor Dr. Erich Goglia, filed a report with the Austrian authorities which included a list of 51 paintings still in Priester's possession as of 4 May 1937.

Mr. Priester had sent photographs of his paintings to his secretary Mrs. Geiringer and his solicitor Mr. Hunna after the war. Together with the photographs, Mr. Priester also sent them a list of his paintings. They brought this matter to the attention of the police in Vienna, who as a result published pictures in a police circular dated 21 May 1954.

In 1953 the Rubens painting, Man with a fur coat, was found by the Vienna police in the ownership of Julius Strecker, a former appraiser for the Gestapo, who had bought it from Vienna art dealer Josef Hofmann-Altenheim in the summer of 1951. Swiss customs seized it from the shipping company Weltifurrer in Zurich.

Other paintings from Priester's collection that were located in the 1950s include the Cranach Madonna with veil and child, among others.

In 2005 the Brouwer was discovered for sale at Hampel auction house in Munich, and in 2006 'Portrait of a man' by the Master of Frankfurt was identified for sale at Christie's London. In 2013 the Van Orley was located for sale at Christie's New York attributed to Sittow

In 2004, the Virginia Museum of Fine Arts in Richmond restituted Corneille de Lyon's Portrait of Jean d'Albon (1539) to Priester's heirs. In 2015 El Greco's Portrait of a Gentleman was restituted, after its false provenance was discovered to conceal the Nazi looting of Priester. Priester's name had been omitted and the name of a collector who never owned the painting, Ritter von Schoeller, had been inserted in the ownership history of the painting, which had, in reality, transited via the Gestapo appraiser Bernhard Wittke to Sanct Lucas gallery, owned by art dealer Frederick Mont, Rudolph J. Heinemann's Pinakos Gallery, the Knoedler Galleries and a Swiss Trust company before reaching a dealer in New York.

Many artworks from the collection have not been located, including those by Rubens and van Dyck.

== Philanthropy ==
According to ANA GARDUÑO, Julius Priester donated several paintings to the Museo Nacional de San Carlos.

== See also ==
- Aryanization
