= Leone McNeil Zimmer =

Leone McNeil Zimmer (1916 - 2014) was a stained glass artist who lived in Mendocino, California.

== Biography ==
Leone McNeil was born in National City, California, and grew up in Los Angeles. She earned a bachelor of education degree as an art major at the University of California, Los Angeles, raised a family, and then in her 40s went back to school, earning a second bachelor's degree and in 1965 a Master of Fine Arts degree from the Otis College of Art and Design. In 1975, she divorced her first husband Robert McNeil and moved to Mendocino; in 1991, she married widowed Mendocino artist Warren George Zimmer, who died in 1999. She died on April 26, 2014.

== Art ==
McNeil's MFA project was in fused glass, but she later moved to leaded stained glass work as well as using epoxy to join the pieces of glass in her works. She also created art using pastels, acrylic paint, and watercolors, as well as some sculpture.

McNeil is best known for her stained glass work in churches. She has provided glass panels for the Mendocino Presbyterian Church, First Presbyterian Church and Trinity Lutheran Church in Fort Bragg, California, St. David's Episcopal Church of Ashburn, Virginia, and the Hoag Memorial Hospital Chapel in Newport Beach, California.
