= Olsi Baze =

Albanian columnist, writer and human rights activist

Olsi Baze (born February 26, 1977) is a columnist, writer and human rights activist. From 1999 until 2008 he studied politics at University Paris 8. He graduated with a Ph.D. degree in geopolitics in 2005. He has taught international politics and is well known in region of the Balkans for his publications, in international newspapers. Mr. Baze is author of two books "The integration of Albania in a regional and world hierarchic order" and "Shadows and lights on the International Relations"

As a board member of Albanian human rights group, he participated in the elaboration of the project low on defending the children's rights specially the cases war victims. One of his major fights was the introduction on the Lustration Law, with the team of five personalities, in the national parliament. The Lustration Law claimed the clanking of public administration of people who has committed crimes during the socialist regime.
