= Kibesillah, California =

Unincorporated community in California, United States

Kibesillah
- Location within California Location within the United States
- Coordinates: 39°35′25″N 123°46′40″W
- Country: United States
- State: California
- County: Mendocino
- Elevation: 138 ft (42 m)

Kibesillah (Pomo: Kabe Sila, meaning "Rock Flat") is a former settlement in Mendocino County, California, United States. It is located on California State Route 1 near the Pacific coast, 3.25 miles (5.2 km) south of Westport, at an elevation of 138 feet (42 m).

Nearby on the coast, a rock named kibesillah lay at the southern end of a large shoal of mussels named lilem, separated from the shore by a narrow sea channel. Various Native American peoples including the Mishkei-ontilka or Lilem people and the Coast Yuki would gather there seasonally to collect mussels. Yellow-hammer's deeds, a legend of the Cahto (another group who lived inland), is set at this place.

Settlers began living in Kibesillah in the 1860s, and the town grew to include a blacksmith, a school, a church, and multiple saloons and hotels. Its main business was loading onto ships wood products produced at a mill in Newport, roughly 3 miles (5 km) south. It was briefly "one of the most important communities on the Mendocino coast", but faded after the Newport lumber mill was moved to the headlands of Fort Bragg, farther south, in 1885. A post office operated at Kibesillah from 1874 to 1889.
