= Time Unveiling Truth (Tiepolo) =

Painting by Giovanni Battista Tiepolo

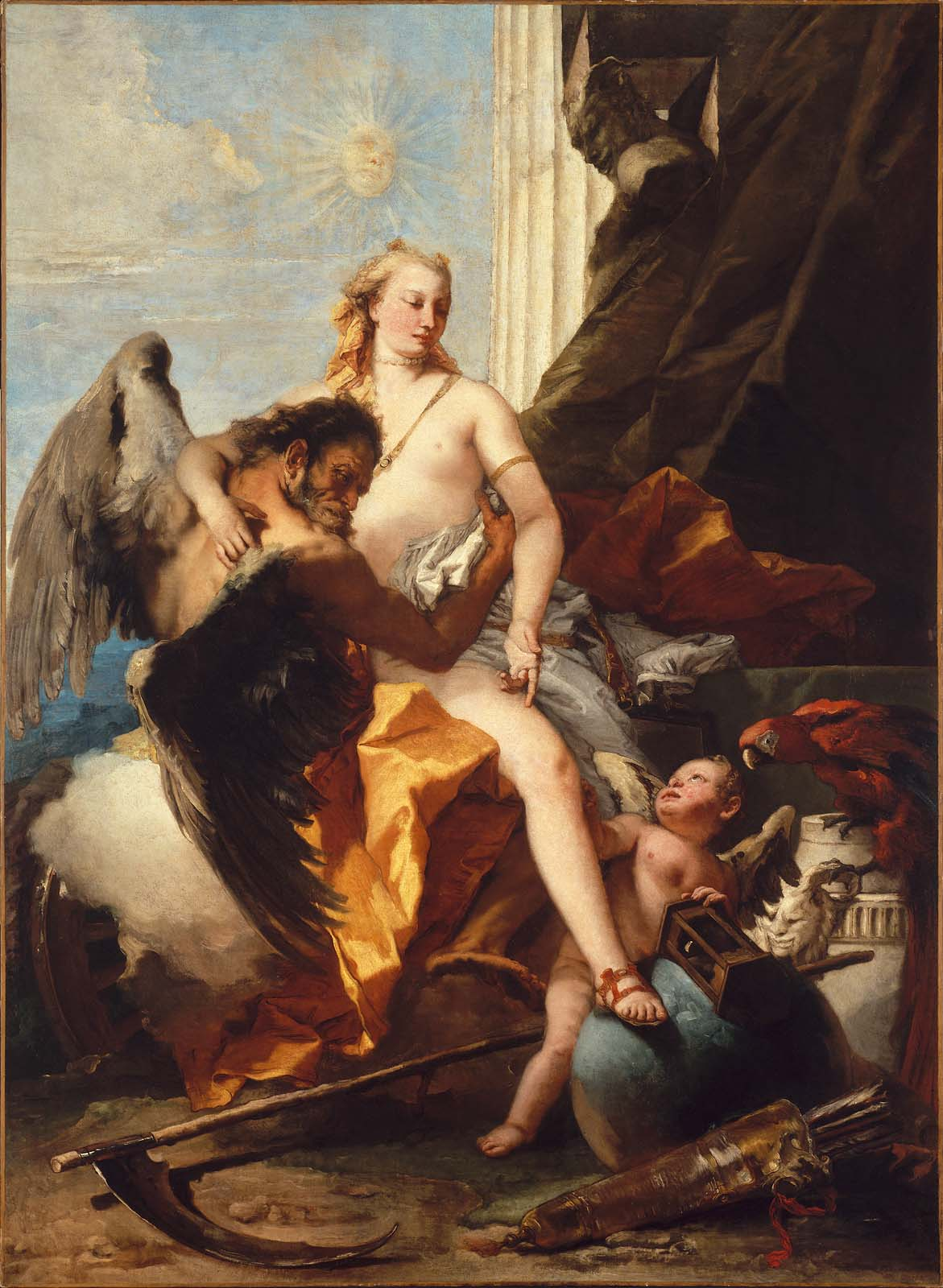
- Artist: Giovanni Battista Tiepolo
- Year: c. 1745–1750
- Medium: Oil on canvas
- Dimensions: 231.1 cm × 167 cm (91.0 in × 66 in)
- Location: Museum of Fine Arts; Boston

Time Unveiling Truth is a painting c. 1745–1750 by the Italian painter Tiepolo. It is now on display in the Museum of Fine Arts, Boston in Boston, Massachusetts. Father Time is shown on a chariot with a scythe uncovering the body of a female figure of Truth.

The work remained in Verona until the 19th century, when it was transferred to Paris and resold several times, until it was bought by Rudolph Heinemann in 1960, who took it to New York. In 1961, it was sold to the Museum of Fine Arts in Boston, where the work remains today.

== Provenance ==
It was sold by Rudolph J. Heinemann to the Museum of Fine Arts of Boston for $210,000, on December 13, 1961.

== See also ==
- Truth Unveiled by Time, sculpture by Gian Lorenzo Bernini, 1646-1652
- Time Saving Truth from Falsehood and Envy by François Lemoyne
