= Masonic Hall (Mendocino, California) =

Historic building in California, US

- Mendocino Masonic Hall
- U.S. Historic district – Contributing property
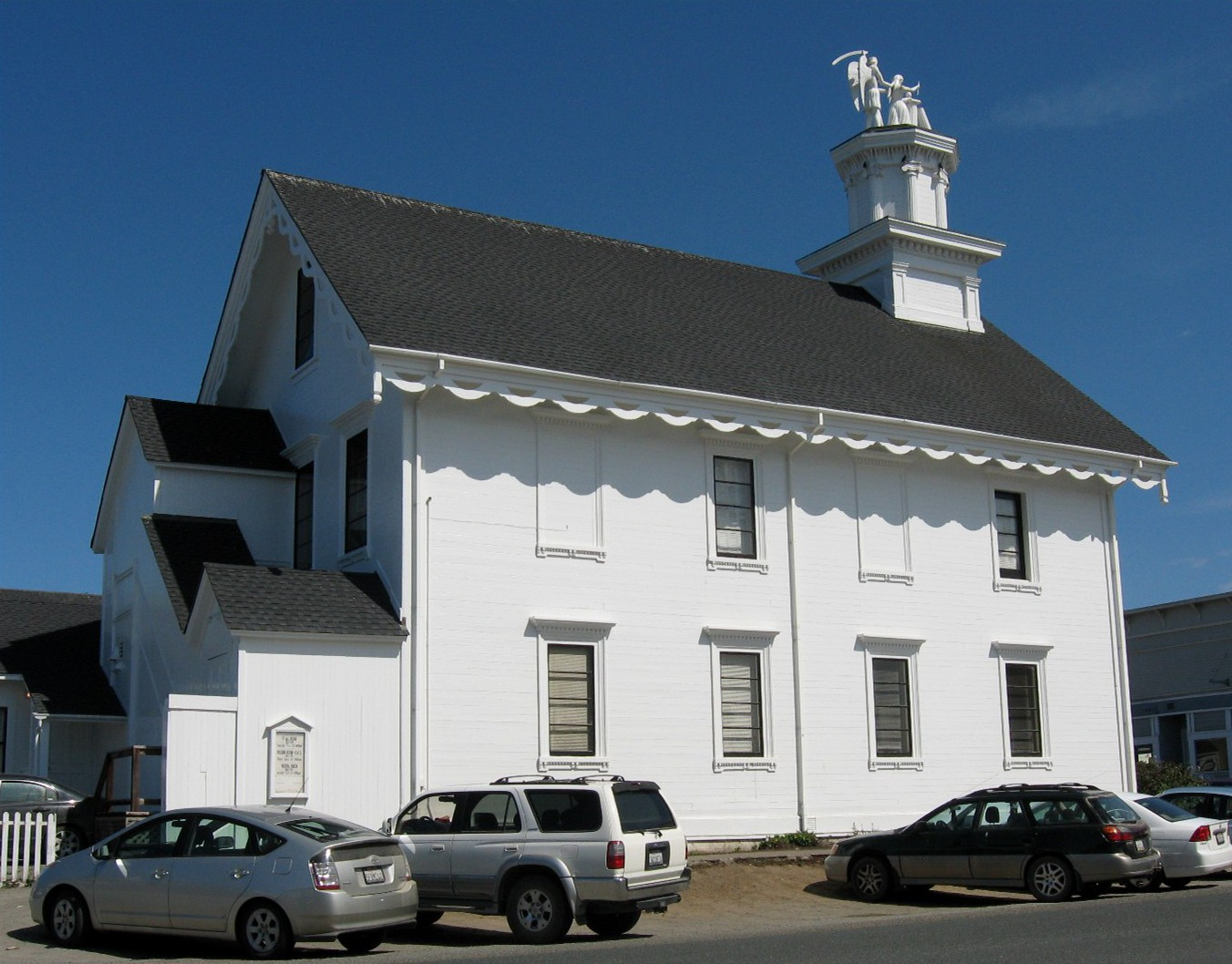
- Masonic Hall south face, as seen from Ukiah Street
- Interactive map of Mendocino Masonic Hall
- Location: 10500 Lansing Street; Mendocino, California, United States
- Coordinates: 39.3064°N 123.7988°W
- Built: 1866–1873; 153 years ago
- Built by: Erick Albertson
- Architects: Erick Albertson and John Gschwend
- Architectural style: Federal
- Website: mendocinomasons.net
- Part of: Mendocino and Headlands Historic District (ID71000165)
- Designated CP: July 14, 1971

The Masonic Hall, also known as the Masonic Temple and Mendocino Lodge No. 179, is a historic Masonic building located at 10500 Lansing Street in Mendocino, California.

== History ==
The initial discussion of its creation dates to a meeting in March 1865 of seven members of the Masonic fraternity that had taken up residence in the area, in a private room above the Mendocino General Store (owned by William Heeser, also a Mason). Retaining their membership in the organization required affiliating with a local lodge whenever they moved but finding none operating in the area, all agreed to begin the process of creating one. In accordance with the fraternity's system of parliamentary law, a chairman was selected and motions were carried to formally petition the Grand Lodge of California for dispensation to form a new lodge and that it be given the name 'Mendocino Lodge' unless the current Grand Master of California, William Caldwell Belcher, would consent to use of the name 'Belcher Lodge' in his honor. The original minutes of that meeting remain in the lodge's archives and show those in attendance (listed by their most recent lodge of membership, if available) to have been:

- Kennebec Lodge No. 5 - Hallowell, Maine
  - Silas B. Coombs (1817–94)
  - Richard G. Coombs (1835–1910)
- Rising Sun Lodge No. 71 - Orland, Maine
  - George R. Lowell
  - F. B. Lowell
- Abell Lodge No. 146 - Ukiah, California
  - Erick Jensen Albertson (1835–72)
- Stirling Lodge No. 69 - Stirling, Ontario (Canada)
  - William Booth
- Lodge Unknown
  - Isaiah Stevens (1809–85)

Upon learning that their petition was likely to be approved a second meeting was held on July 3, 1865, with all the original attendees plus: G. E. Cummings, A. J. Rogers, John Gardiner Cheever (1826–96), William Heeser (1833–1906), James Bush Rice (1829–97) and George Canning Smith (1827–1907). Nominations were opened and elections held for the charter lodge officers, resulting in the following selections:

- Erick Jensen Albertson, Worshipful Master
- William Heeser, Senior Warden
- George R. Lowell, Junior Warden
- F. B. Lowell, Chairman
- George Canning Smith, Secretary

The petition for Dispensation originally made to Grand Master Belcher was granted October 23, 1865, by his successor, Gilbert B. Clairborne. Included with the official document was a letter from the Grand Secretary, Alex Abell, stated that Belcher did not wish a lodge named after him, and accordingly their selection of the name of 'Mendocino Lodge' was approved.

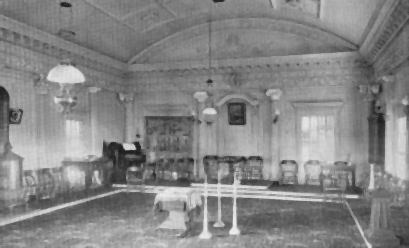
Photograph of the lodge room in the Masonic Hall (Mendocino, California), looking east, circa 1896.

The new lodge met officially on December 30, 1865, in the room above the store, during which Heeser made known his intention to donate the title to a prime parcel of land at the corner of Lansing and Ukiah streets for the group to build a permanent hall in which to meet. Another meeting on January 27, 1866, produced the election of trustees to oversee its construction and finally on February 24 the selection of Erick Albertson to erect the structure was made, for the sum of $1,000. He began the work after receiving assistance in drafting the plans for its design from John Gschwend, a Swiss immigrant well known for the quality of his design for the first saw mill in nearby Anderson Valley. It was not completed until 1873 due to Albertson continuing to work full time at the nearby lumber mill, the lack of a dedicated workspace for him to use, and the funds having to be paid out in installments.

== Time and the Maiden ==
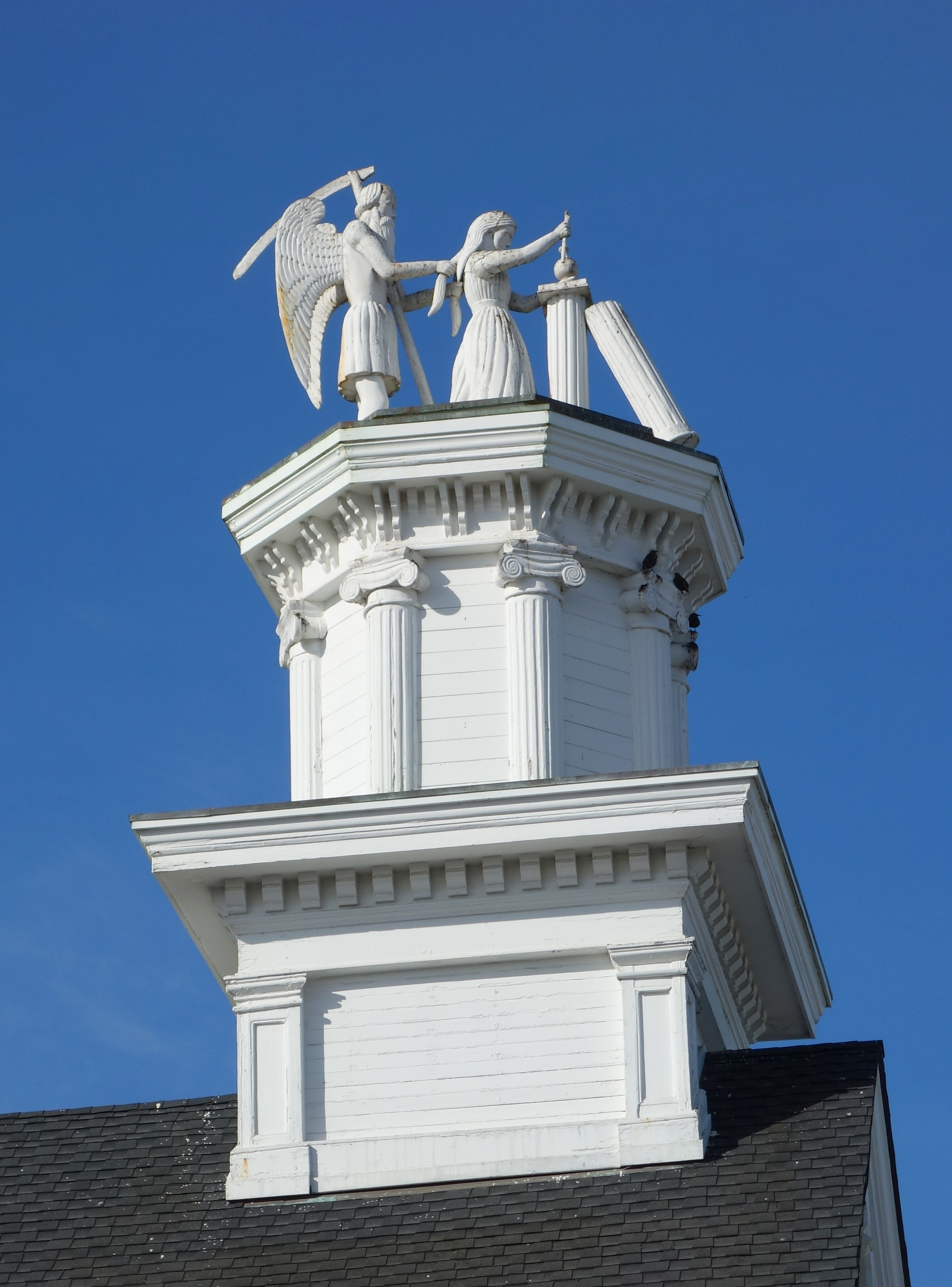
Time and the Maiden redwood sculpture above the Masonic Hall

Unrelated to the construction and predating it, Albertson also hand-carved the unique sculpture of Time and the Maiden from a single redwood trunk, the finished work measuring over ten feet in height. This took place in a makeshift shelter on the beach at the mouth of Big River he was then living in, with only oil lamps for illumination. Though made only as a personal exercise of craftsmanship, when the hall neared completion an informal agreement among the members was reached that it should be featured on the building and eventually was mounted atop a cupola added specifically for its display. Also known as Father Time and the Weeping Virgin it has become a local landmark, the scene depicted consisting of an hourglass at the foot of a broken column with an open book upon the part still standing, a weeping maiden reading from the book holding an urn in her left hand and a sprig of acacia in her right, and an angel with a scythe standing behind her, braiding her tresses.

=== Symbolism ===
The hourglass represents the transience of human life while the urn and scythe foreshadow its inevitable conclusion. The broken column symbolizes a life cut short prematurely and the weeping maiden those who mourn it, with the open book she's reading being the enduring record of all its accomplishments. Acacia was the wood specified in the Book of Exodus from which to build the Ark of the Covenant, in addition to being an evergreen well known for its resistance to fire and decay, which here serves to signify the immortality of the human spirit. All drawn from history or mythology, they are used in the central allegory of a particular rite of passage within the rituals experienced when joining the fraternity. While the legend itself is held as a secret that should be known only to its members, one Mason summarized the tableau as an homage to the belief that "time, patience and perseverance will accomplish all things."

== Popular culture ==
The building has often been used as a backdrop for scenes in movies and TV series such as Murder She Wrote (1984–1996) with Angela Lansbury and two episodes of The Fugitive (2001), with Tim Daly.

== Landmark status ==
The Masonic Hall is a contributing property in the Mendocino and Headlands Historic District which was added on July 14, 1971, to the National Register of Historic Places.

== Current operations ==
Mendocino Lodge No. 179, Free & Accepted Masons of California, continues to hold its meetings on the second floor of the building while much of the first floor now serves as the local branch of the Savings Bank of Mendocino County, to whom the building was sold in 1977.
