= Olší (Jihlava District) =

- Municipality
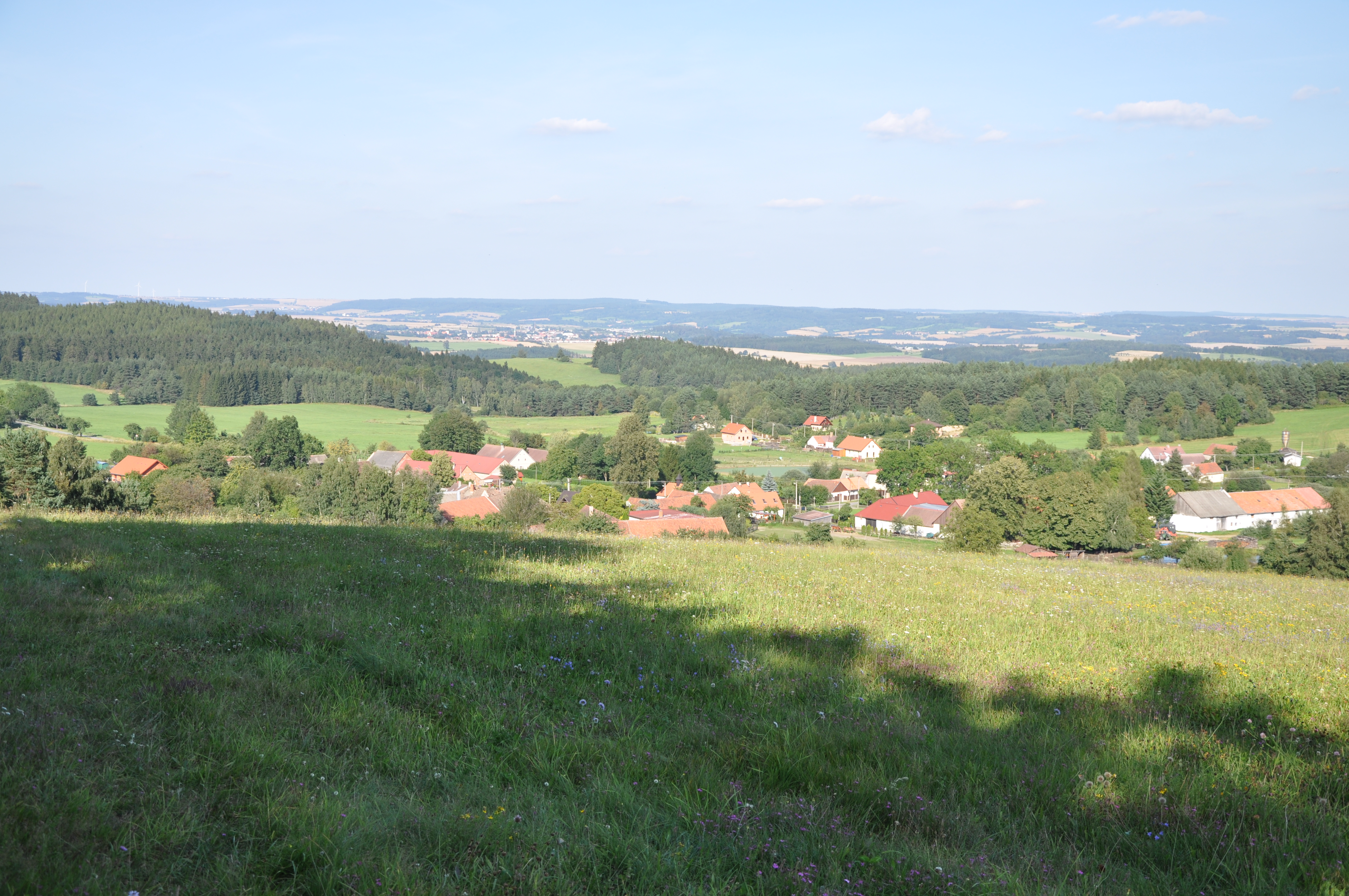
- View from the southwest

- Location in the Czech Republic
- Coordinates: 49°9′20″N 15°22′24″E
- Country: Czech Republic
- Region: Vysočina
- District: Jihlava
- First mentioned: 1529

Area
  - Total: 3.61 km^{2} (1.39 sq mi)
- Elevation: 611 m (2,005 ft)

Population (2026-01-01)
  - Total: 76
  - Density: 21/km^{2} (55/sq mi)
- Time zone: UTC+1 (CET)
  - Summer (DST): UTC+2 (CEST)
- Postal code: 588 56
- Website: obecolsi.cz

Olší (Czech pronunciation: [ˈolʃiː]) is a municipality and village in Jihlava District in the Vysočina Region of the Czech Republic. It has about 80 inhabitants.

Olší lies approximately 31 kilometres (19 mi) south-west of Jihlava and 124 km (77 mi) south-east of Prague.

== Demographics ==
Historical population
Year	Pop.	±%
1869	143	—
1880	139	−2.8%
1890	151	+8.6%
1900	150	−0.7%
1910	141	−6.0%
1921	161	+14.2%
1930	151	−6.2%
1950	114	−24.5%
1961	114	+0.0%
1970	96	−15.8%
1980	70	−27.1%
1991	61	−12.9%
2001	60	−1.6%
2011	60	+0.0%
2021	65	+8.3%
Source: Censuses

== Notable people ==
- Julius Priester (1870–1955), Austrian industrialist and art collector
