= Truth Unveiled by Time (Bernini) =

Sculpture by Gian Lorenzo Bernini

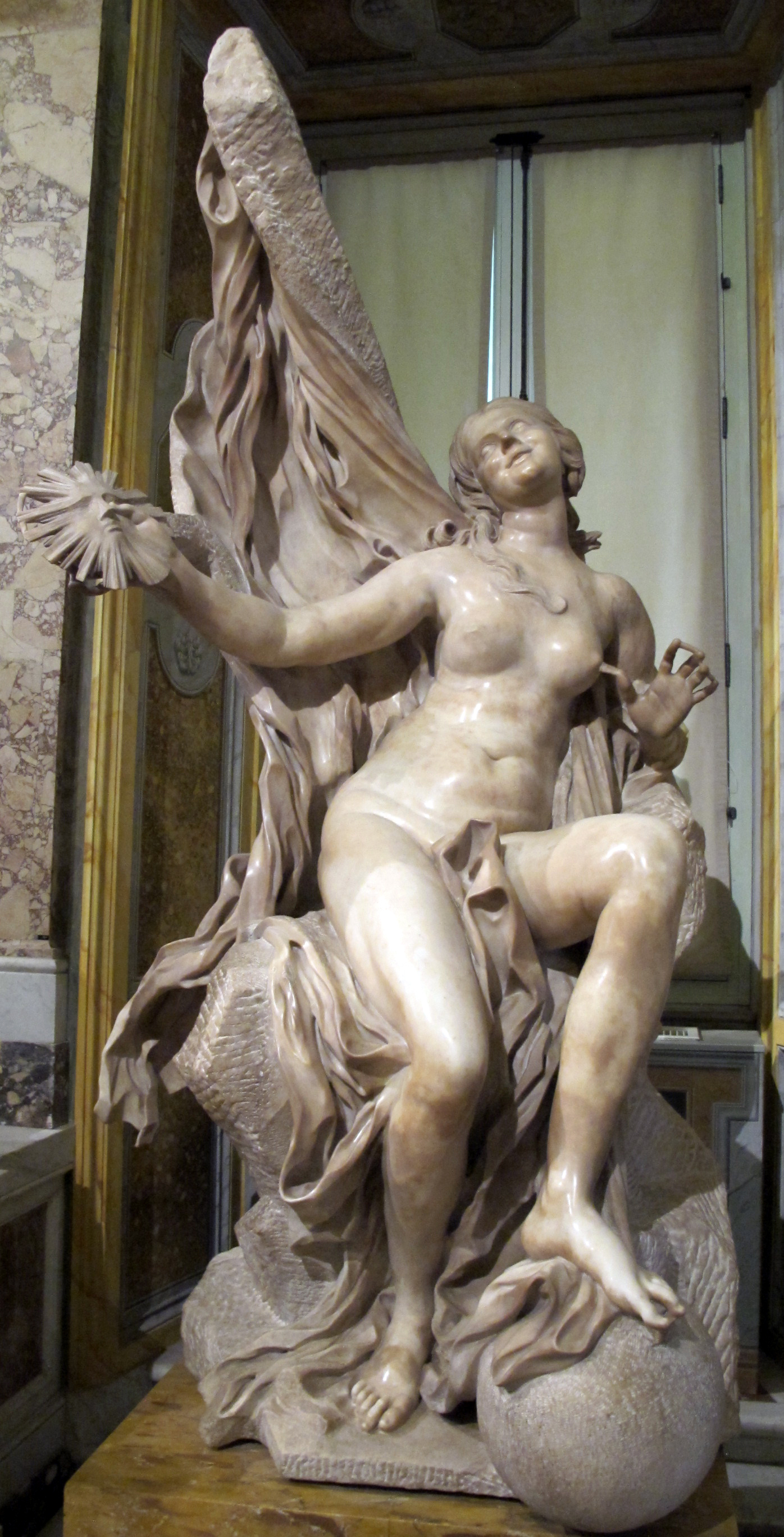
- Artist: Gian Lorenzo Bernini
- Year: 1645–1652
- Catalogue: 49
- Type: Sculpture
- Medium: Marble
- Dimensions: 277 cm (109 in)
- Location: Galleria Borghese; Rome; 41°54′50.4″N 12°29′31.2″E
- Preceded by: Ecstasy of Saint Teresa
- Followed by: Busts of Pope Innocent X

Truth Unveiled by Time is a marble sculpture by Italian artist Gian Lorenzo Bernini, one of the foremost sculptors of the Italian Baroque. Executed between 1645 and 1652, Bernini intended to show Truth allegorically as a naked young woman being unveiled by a figure of Time above her, but the figure of Time was never executed.

== Historical background ==
Upon his election to the papacy in 1623, Maffeo Vincenzo Barberini took the name Pope Urban VIII and appointed Bernini as the principal artist for the papal court in Rome. According to Bernini's biographer Baldinucci, Maffeo had 'scarcely ascended the sacred throne' when he summoned Bernini and told him:

"It is your great fortune to see Cardinal Maffeo Barberini Pope, but our fortune is far greater in that Cavalier Bernini lives during our pontificate."

Bernini enjoyed great success during his time as the principal artist for the papal court but, after Urban's death in 1644, he was removed by the incoming pope, Innocent X. The new pope had more conservative tastes and favored Bernini's rival Algardi. Despite the fall from favor this did not stop Bernini from occasionally working for the new pope - One of his most famous works, the Fountain of the Four Rivers, was one of the projects done for Innocent. He still maintained his position as the architect of St. Peter's despite his removal from the papal court and, after Innocent's death in 1655, was immediately given two major commissions at St. Peter's: decorating the Cathedra Petri and building a colonnade round the piazza.

Bernini's rationale for creating Truth Unveiled by Time was, according to his son Domenico, as a sculptural retort to attacks from opponents criticizing his failed project to build two towers onto the front of St. Peter's Basilica. While this is certainly plausible, historians are unsure of the validity of Domenico's claims relating to his father's reasoning. Cracks had appeared in the facade due to the inability of the foundations to support the towers and Bernini's architectural expansion received the blame. What many fail to mention is that most of the blame lies with Carlo Maderno, the previous architect who built weak foundations for the monumental task being requested, and Pope Urban VIII, who kept pressuring Bernini for heavier, more elaborate bell towers.

During the difficult time after Urban's death, Bernini was able to find peace and serenity in his overwhelming confidence that one day he would be vindicated. So strong was this conviction that he created Truth Unveiled by Time to express this confidence in his eventual vindication. Despite this conviction, the sculpture of Father Time was never begun and the project remained incomplete. It has been suggested by historian Franco Mormando that Bernini's return to public favor after Innocent's death might have made the sculptural piece lose the emotional urgency it had previously possessed, which would make sense considering he had been reinstated to his previous place in the upper echelons of society.

== Visual description ==
Truth Unveiled by Time is a white marble sculpture that is 280 cm in height, which includes the 17 cm pedestal it rests upon. Seated on a boulder with dramatic, flowing drapes behind her, the maiden Truth holds a representation of the Sun in her right hand at shoulder level as she rests her left leg on the Earth. She gazes upward beyond the Sun with a look of peace and comfort, perhaps even joy. Truth has already been stripped of her garments. The strategically placed drapery of the statue is suggestive and not as blatant as truly profane scenes. Her bare chest and stomach are visible while her groin is covered by some of the flowing drapery. There is a sense of movement, emotion, and vigor in her being, and the cold marble appears to be as supple as real flesh. According to Bernini's biographer Baldinucci:

"His chisel was applied in such a way that one could believe it had been cutting wax instead of marble."

== Provenance ==
Bernini began the preparatory work for Truth Unveiled by Time in 1645, during the critical period after the death of his main patron pope Urban VIII, and the figure of Truth was largely complete by 1652. Despite never completing the figure of Time, Bernini left the sculpture in his will in perpetuity to the first-born of the Bernini family; although in fact Bernini tried to sell the work to Cardinal Mazarin of France. It remained in the family (displayed on a tilted stucco block during the 19th century) until 1924, when it was purchased by the Italian government and transferred to its current home on a plinth in room VI of the Galleria Borghese. Its plinth there was originally tilted but it is now on a flat plinth after a recent restoration, leaving Truth more upright as it was originally displayed.

Sometime in 1647 Bernini designed and began executing the larger-than-life-size marble group. The sculpture was referred to in a letter sent by the duke of Bracciano, Paolo Giordano II Orsini to Cardinal Mazzarino on July 6, 1647. After his death the sculpture was situated in Bernini’s home on Via della Mercede until 1852. Per Bernini's last will and testament, the statue was to remain in perpetual custody of his family, “because by seeing it, all my descendants will be reminded that truth is the most beautiful virtue in the world inasmuch as it is eventually revealed by time.” Subsequently the sculpture was placed in Palazzo Bernini on Via del Corso until 1924. After 1924, the sculpture was held in storage at the Galleria Borghese until it was acquired in 1958 by the Italian government.

== Influences ==
The placement of a maiden on a boulder who holds a sun in the right hand while resting the left leg on the Earth is in accordance with the popular canonical iconography detailed by Cesare Ripa in his famous book Iconologia (Italian for Iconology). Many drawings for the planned sculptural group are known, and in the figure of Truth one can recognize similarities with Correggio's unfinished Allegory of Virtue which is housed in the Galleria Doria Pamphilj in Rome where Bernini might have seen it. Within traditional iconographical conventions, the specific positioning of the legs was also a means of communicating sexual messages to the viewer.

== Artist's intent ==
In creating this work, Bernini intended to give visual representation to a familiar saying used to console victims of injustice: Fear not, for sooner or later time will reveal the truth.

While Bernini was certainly not the first artist to touch on this subject matter, as the theme was already popular in literature and art, he managed to create an original interpretation beyond those previously made by others. The originality and source of distinction in Bernini's rendition is its literal nature – that is, making the action of unveiling the primary focus of representation. Where previous works of literature and art were more concerned with the subjects of Truth and Time, Bernini was more concerned with their actions and what that meant.

Despite not completing the companion figure of Father Time, we do know something of what Bernini had in mind for the finished composition thanks to a surviving preparatory drawing found in Leipzig and an artist's account in a diary.

The completed work as envisioned by Bernini would have featured the old, winged figure of Father Time in the act of stripping clothing from the much younger figure of Lady Truth, who smiles on in delight as her naked truth is exposed for the world to see.

== See also ==
- Time Unveiling Truth, 1745-1750 painting by Giovanni Battista Tiepolo
- Time Saving Truth from Falsehood and Envy by François Lemoyne
- List of works by Gian Lorenzo Bernini
