= Olší (Brno-Country District) =

- Municipality
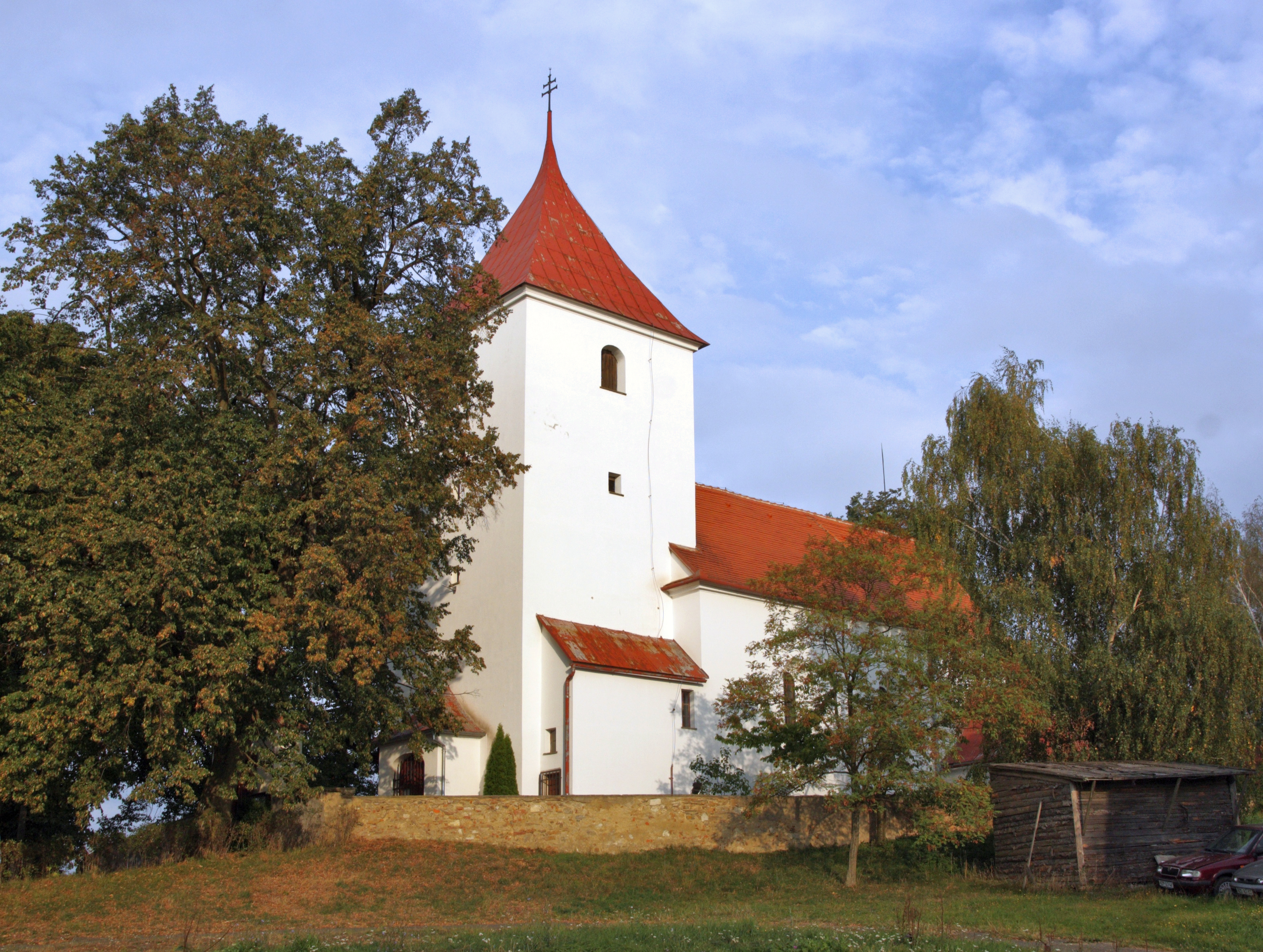
- Church of Saint George

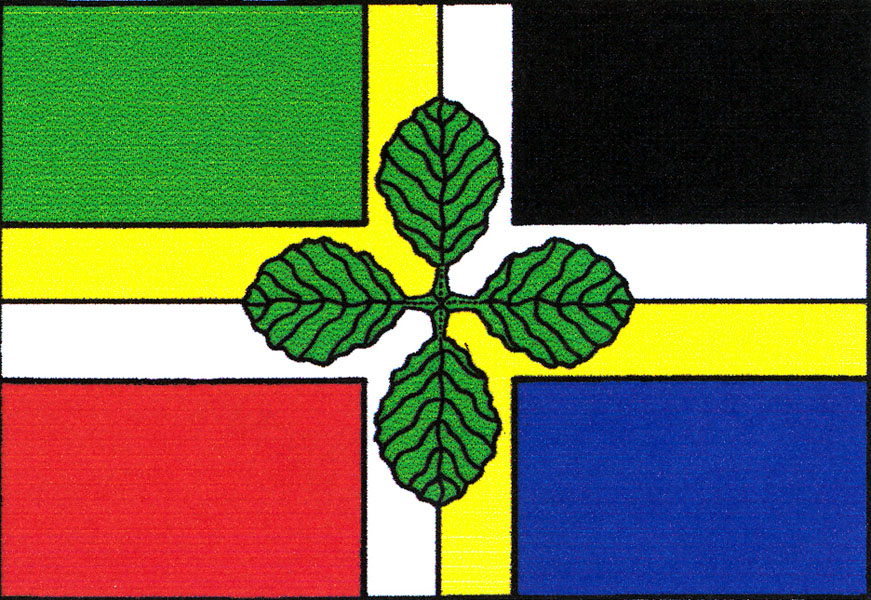
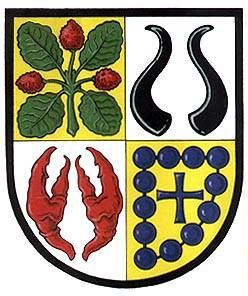
- Flag Coat of arms

- Location in the Czech Republic
- Coordinates: 49°25′17″N 16°17′25″E
- Country: Czech Republic
- Region: South Moravian
- District: Brno-Country
- First mentioned: 1255

Area
  - Total: 8.72 km^{2} (3.37 sq mi)
- Elevation: 537 m (1,762 ft)

Population (2026-01-01)
  - Total: 360
  - Density: 41/km^{2} (110/sq mi)
- Time zone: UTC+1 (CET)
  - Summer (DST): UTC+2 (CEST)
- Postal code: 592 61
- Website: www.olsi.cz

Olší is a municipality and village in Brno-Country District in the South Moravian Region of the Czech Republic. It has about 400 inhabitants.

Olší lies approximately 35 kilometres (22 mi) north-west of Brno and 154 km (96 mi) south-east of Prague.

== Administrative division ==
Olší consists of four municipal parts (in brackets population according to the 2021 census):

- Olší (176)
- Klokočí (43)
- Litava (102)
- Rakové (5)

== Demographics ==
Historical population
Year	Pop.	±%
1869	486	—
1880	569	+17.1%
1890	514	−9.7%
1900	533	+3.7%
1910	455	−14.6%
1921	478	+5.1%
1930	453	−5.2%
1950	405	−10.6%
1961	395	−2.5%
1970	336	−14.9%
1980	309	−8.0%
1991	314	+1.6%
2001	292	−7.0%
2011	283	−3.1%
2021	326	+15.2%
Source: Censuses
