= Westport, California =

Unincorporated community in California, United States

Westport
- Unincorporated community
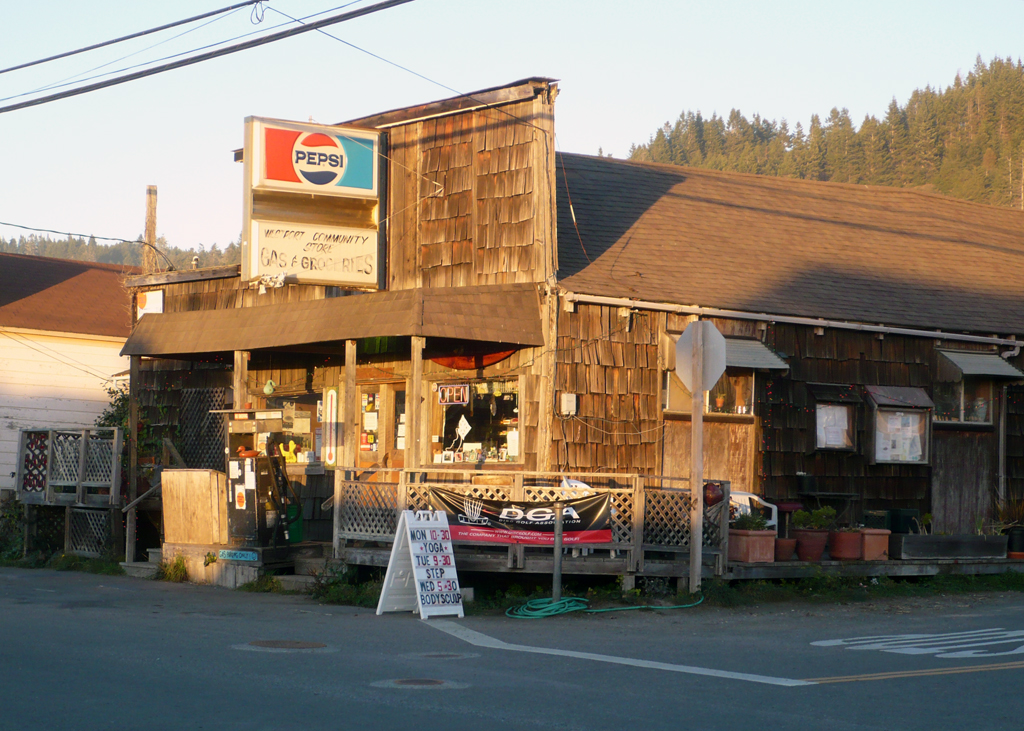
- The Westport Community Store

- Location in California Westport (the United States)
- Coordinates: 39°38′09″N 123°46′59″W
- Country: United States
- State: California
- County: Mendocino
- Elevation: 125 ft (38 m)

Population (2010)
  - Total: 60
- Time zone: UTC-8 (PST)
  - Summer (DST): UTC-7 (PDT)
- ZIP code: 95488
- Area code: 707

Westport (formerly Beall's Landing) is an unincorporated community in Mendocino County, California, United States. It is located on California State Route 1, near the Pacific Ocean, 13 miles (21 km) north of Fort Bragg, and at an elevation of 125 feet (38 m).

The first post office at Westport opened in 1879. Originally called Beall's Landing in honor of Samuel Beall, its first white settler, the place was renamed in 1877 by James T. Rodgers, who built a timber loading facility for the name to remind him of his hometown of Westport, Connecticut.

As of July 2010, the population of Westport was 60. It has a community store with gas pumps, several inns, and, as of 2020, nine Airbnb or VRBO rental homes.

Though small, the village of Westport has a strong community. The Westport County Water District is a municipal agency formed in 1978 that provides drinking water and sewer services for the town of Westport. It has 4 paid employees overseen by a volunteer Board of Directors. The Westport Village Society raised over $100,000 in grant funding to build a staircase from the Westport Headlands down to the town beach, and spearheaded grant funding drives of over $1 million to enable the purchase of land along the coast at DeHaven Creek and Bell Point to preserve them for public trails and access. The residents of Westport maintain a community garden from which organically grown produce is available year-round for consumption by Westport residents and visitors alike.

Westport and its vicinity have been the locale of several disappearances and homicides over the years, including:

- Linda Lee Lovell and Stephen Locke Packard, disappeared in June 1974;
- Christine and Craig Langford, disappeared in January 1981;
- Harlan Sutherland, homicide victim, remains found in August 1987;
- Clyde William Stanley, homicide victim, remains found in March 1988;
- Donald James Cavanaugh and David Virgil Neily, disappeared in March 2005 and April 2006, respectively, from the same address;
- Matthew Coleman, murdered in August 2011;
- Abigail, Ciera, Devonte, Hannah, Jeremiah, and Markis Hart, all murdered by their adoptive mothers, Jen and Sarah Hart, on March 26, 2018, when their SUV intentionally drove over a cliff in a mass murder-suicide, two miles north of Westport. The family had been living in Washington State before the road trip which culminated in the fatal crash. Both perpetrators were known to have abused their six children before the crash.

== See also ==
- Dodge Gulch
- Westport-Union Landing State Beach
